= List of Jesuit sites =

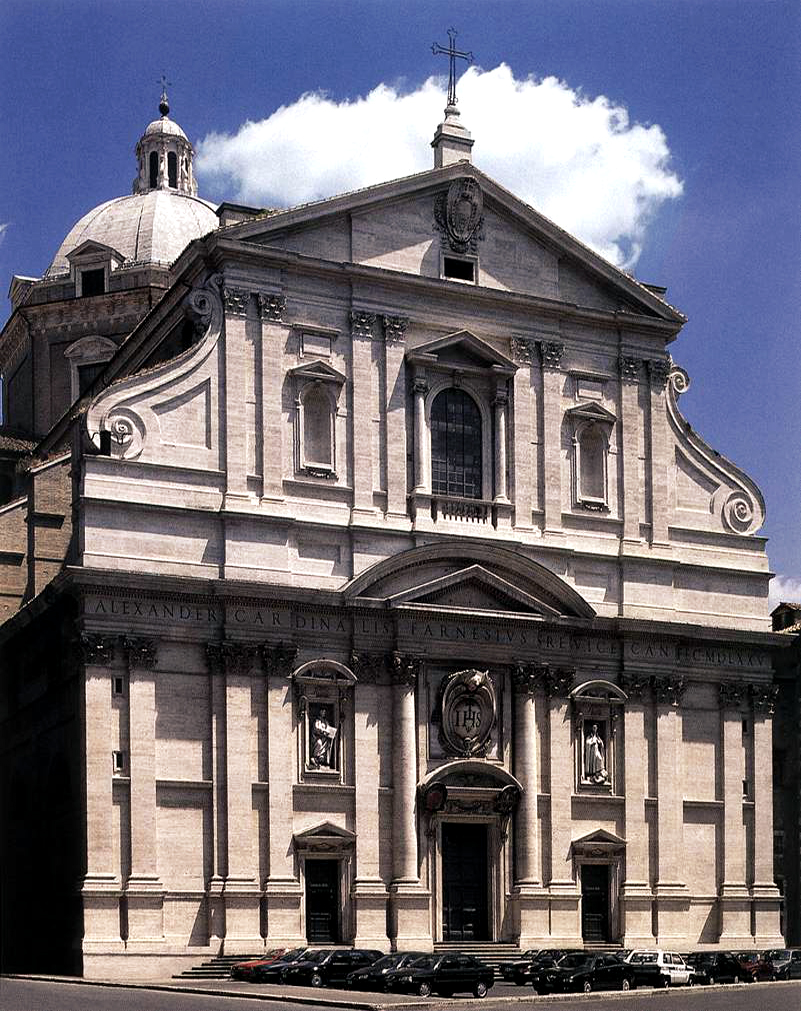
Church of the Gesu, mother church of the Society of Jesus in Rome

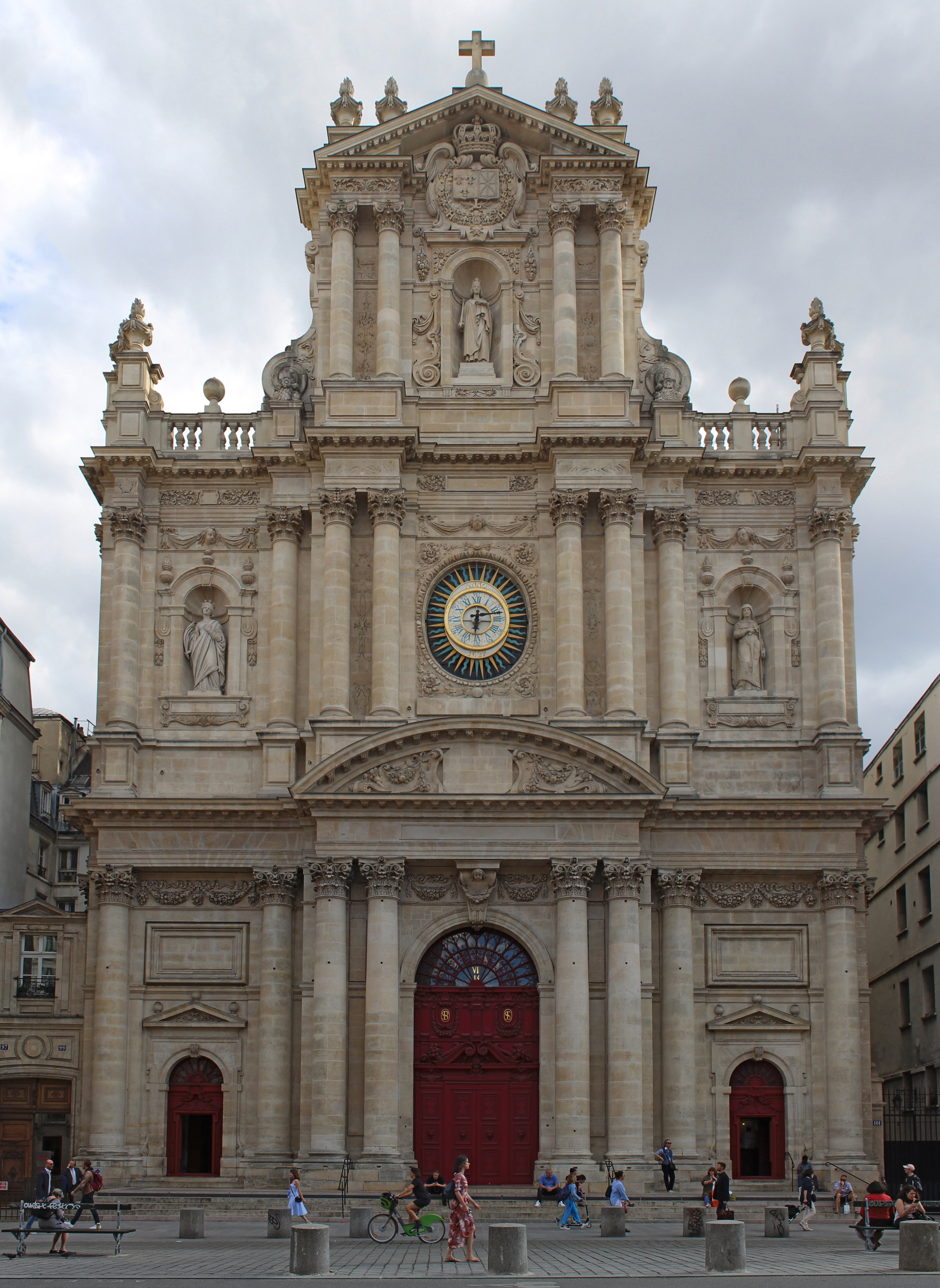
Professed house church in Paris

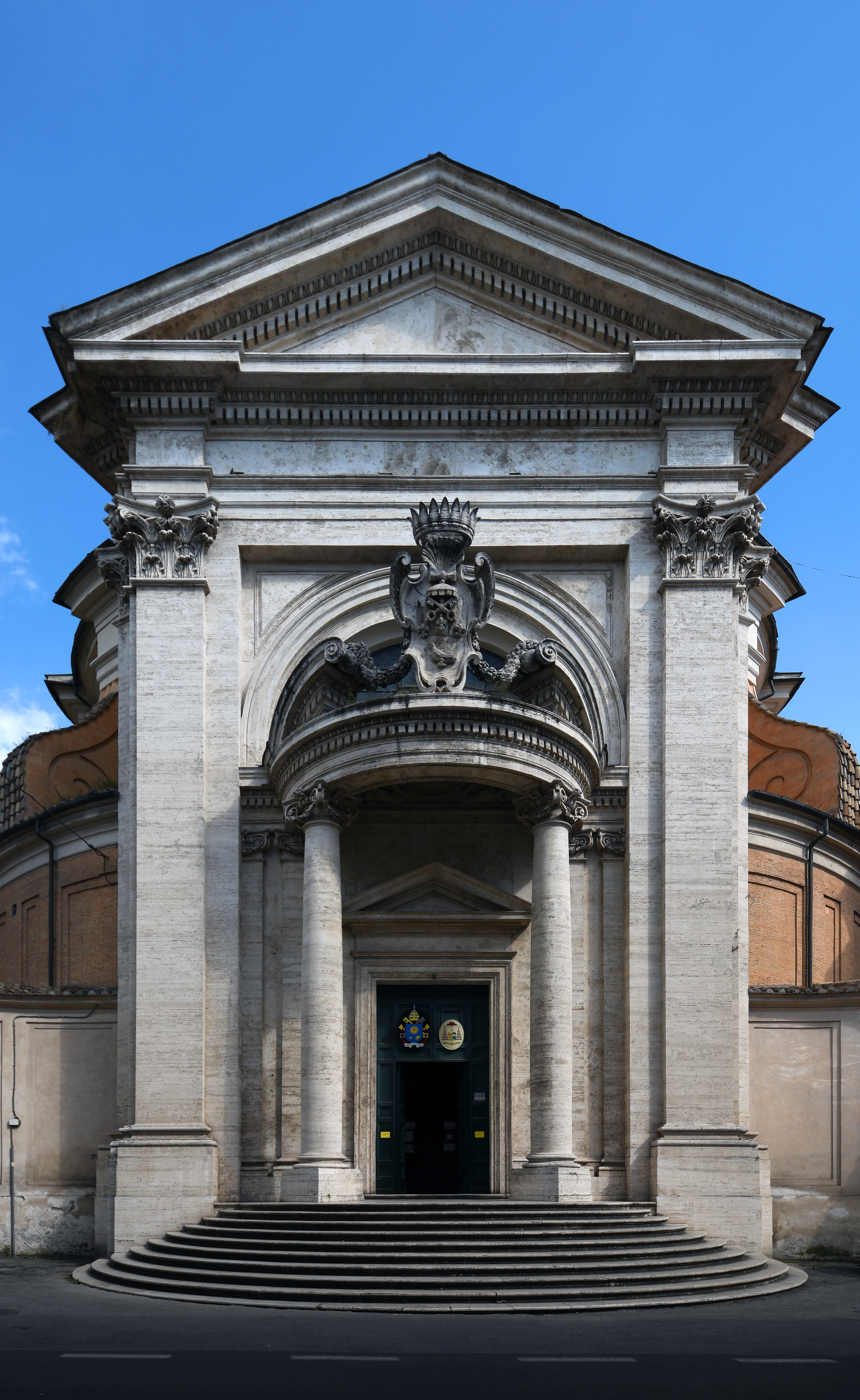
Novitiate of Sant'Andrea al Quirinale, Rome

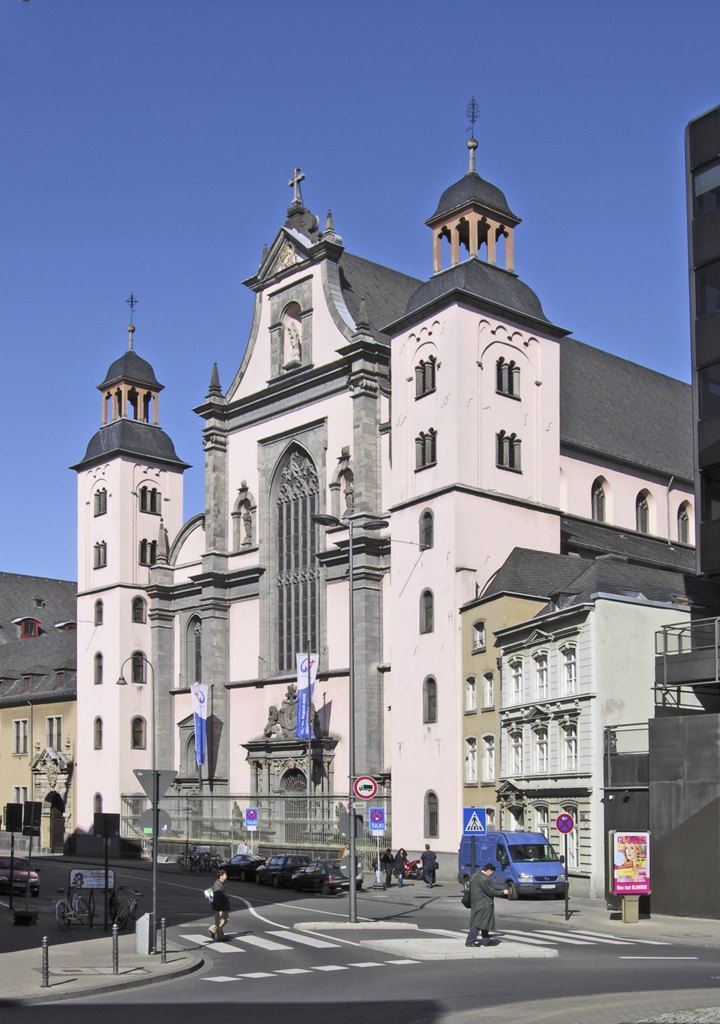
College church (St. Mariä Himmelfahrt), Cologne

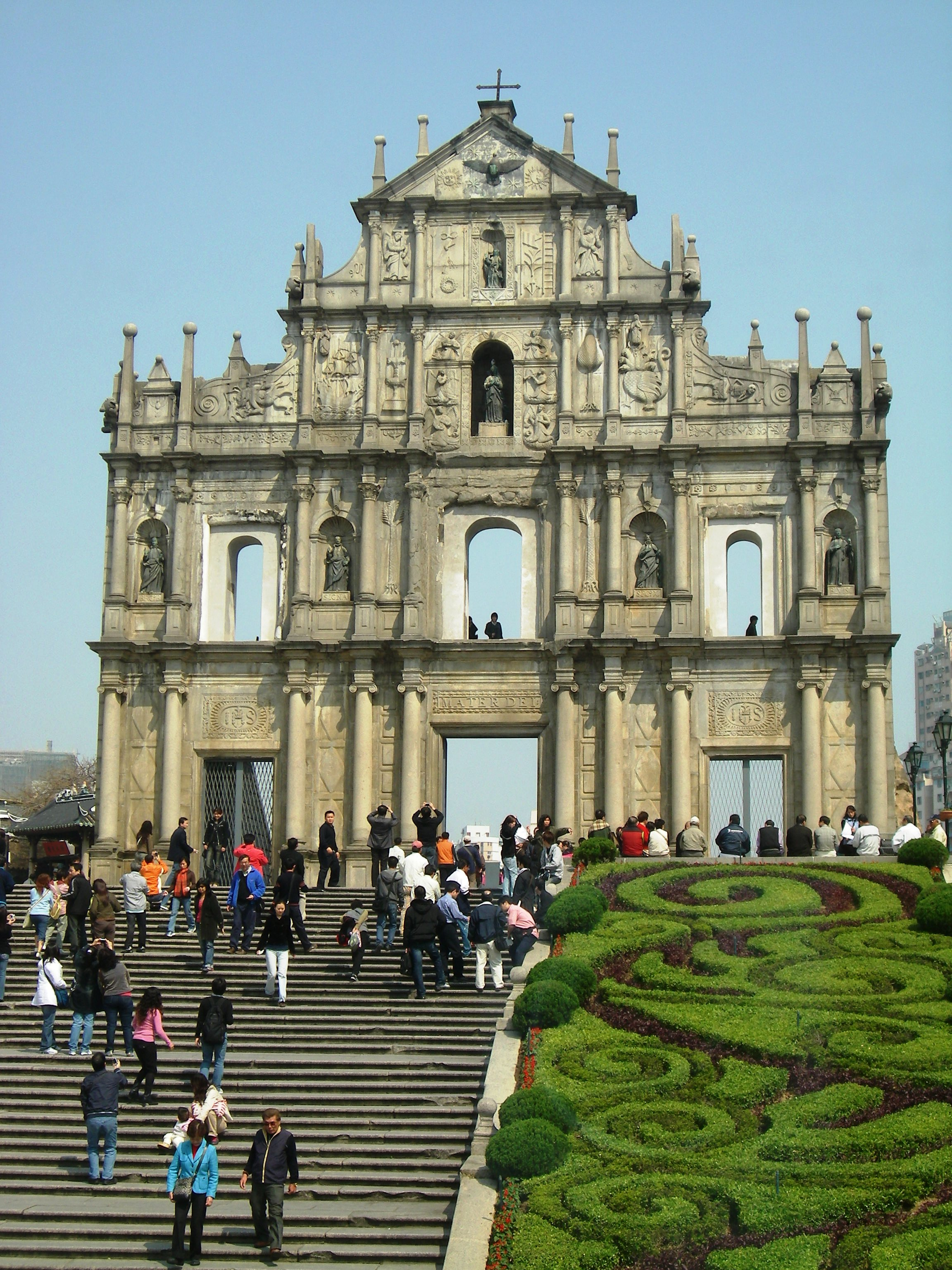
Ruins of Saint Paul's Church, Macau

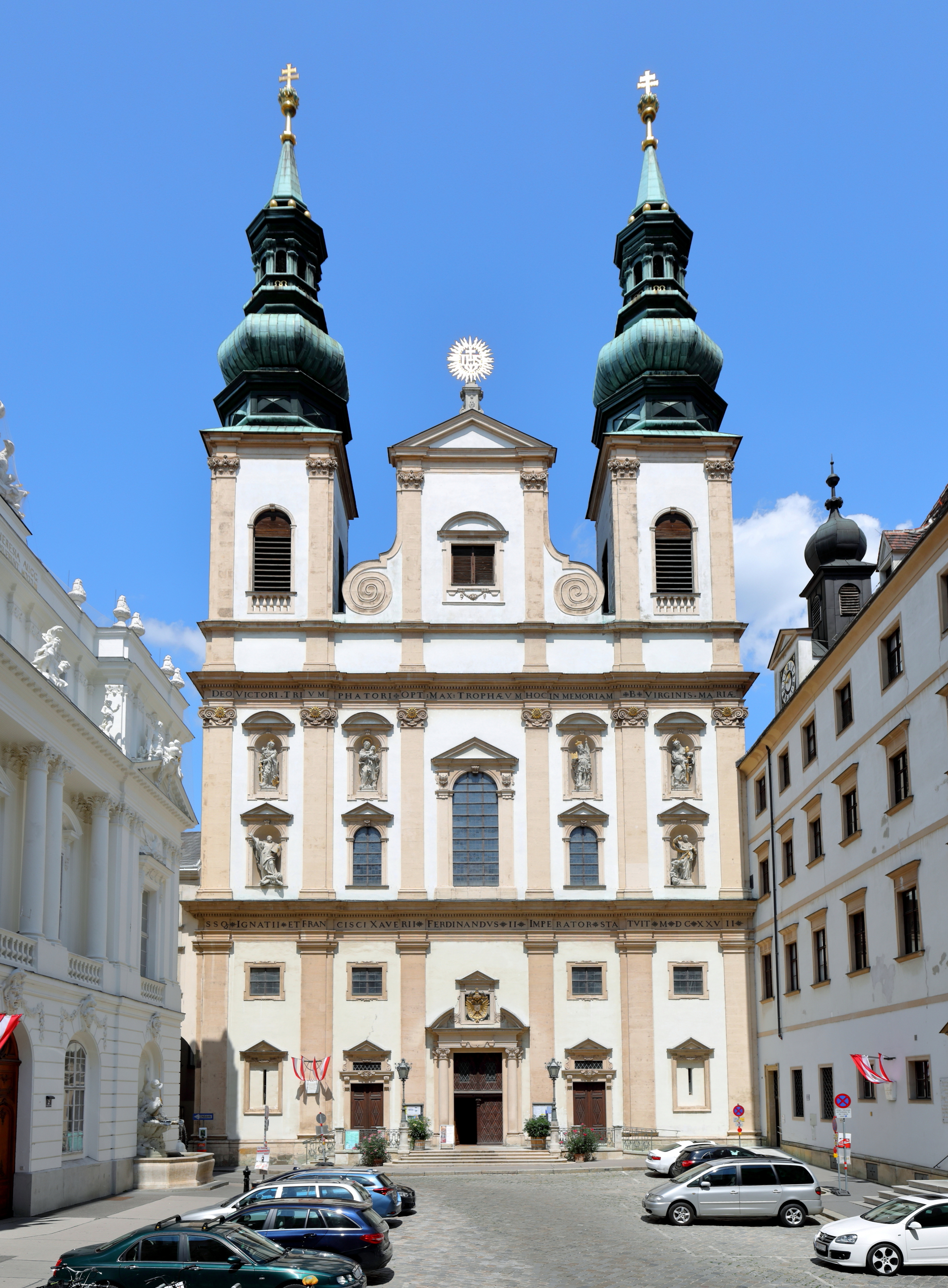
University Church, Vienna

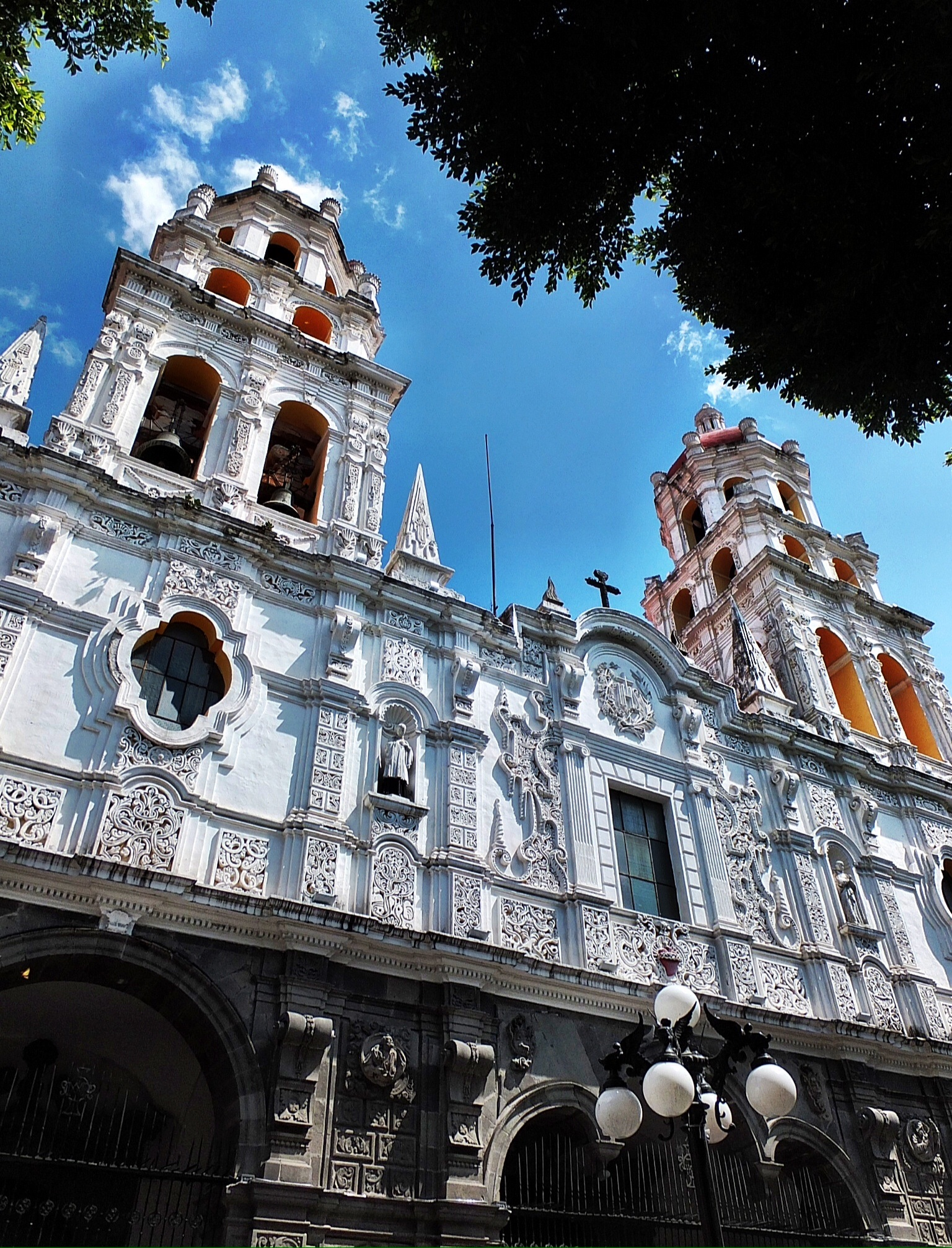
College church, Puebla

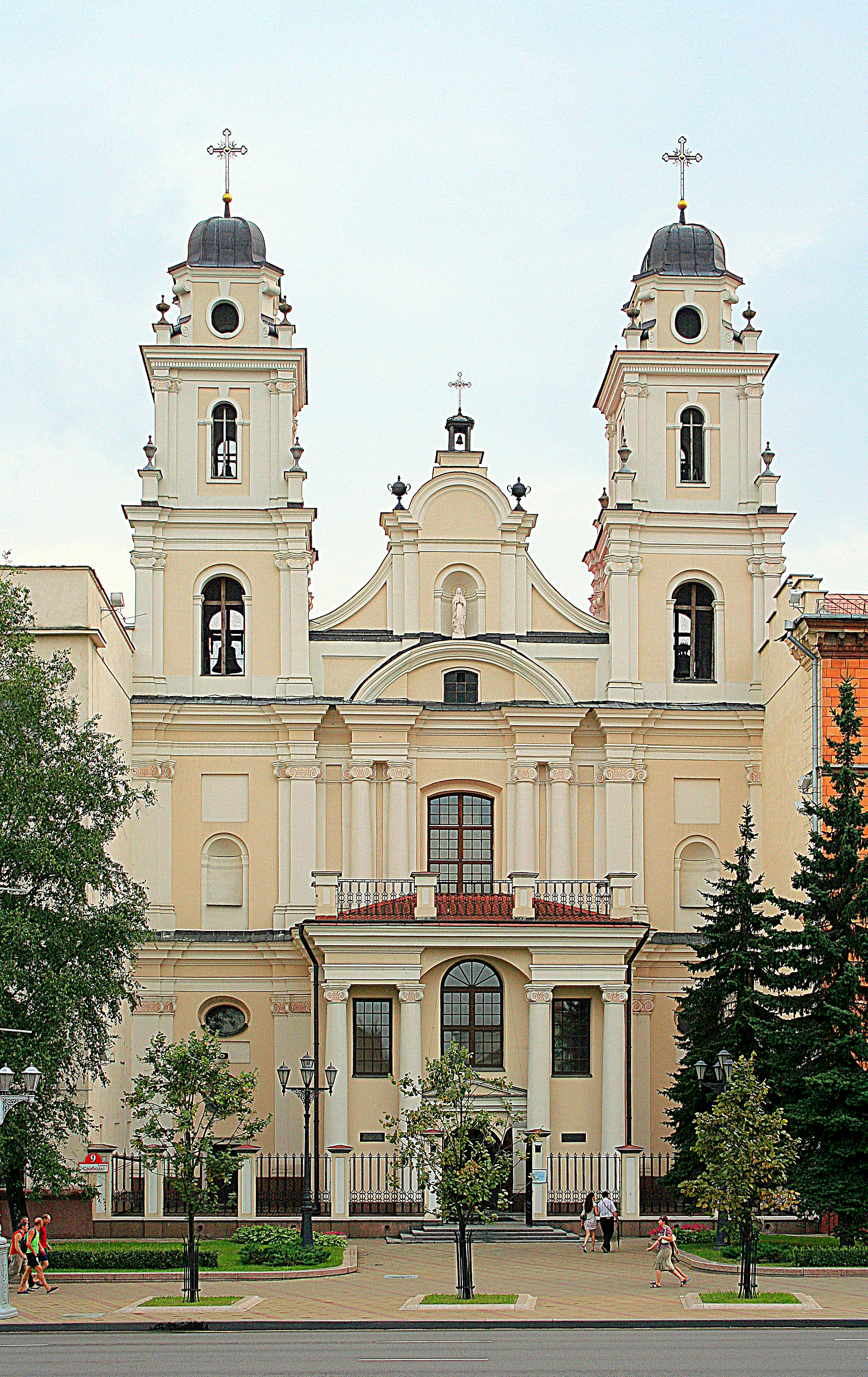
College church, Minsk

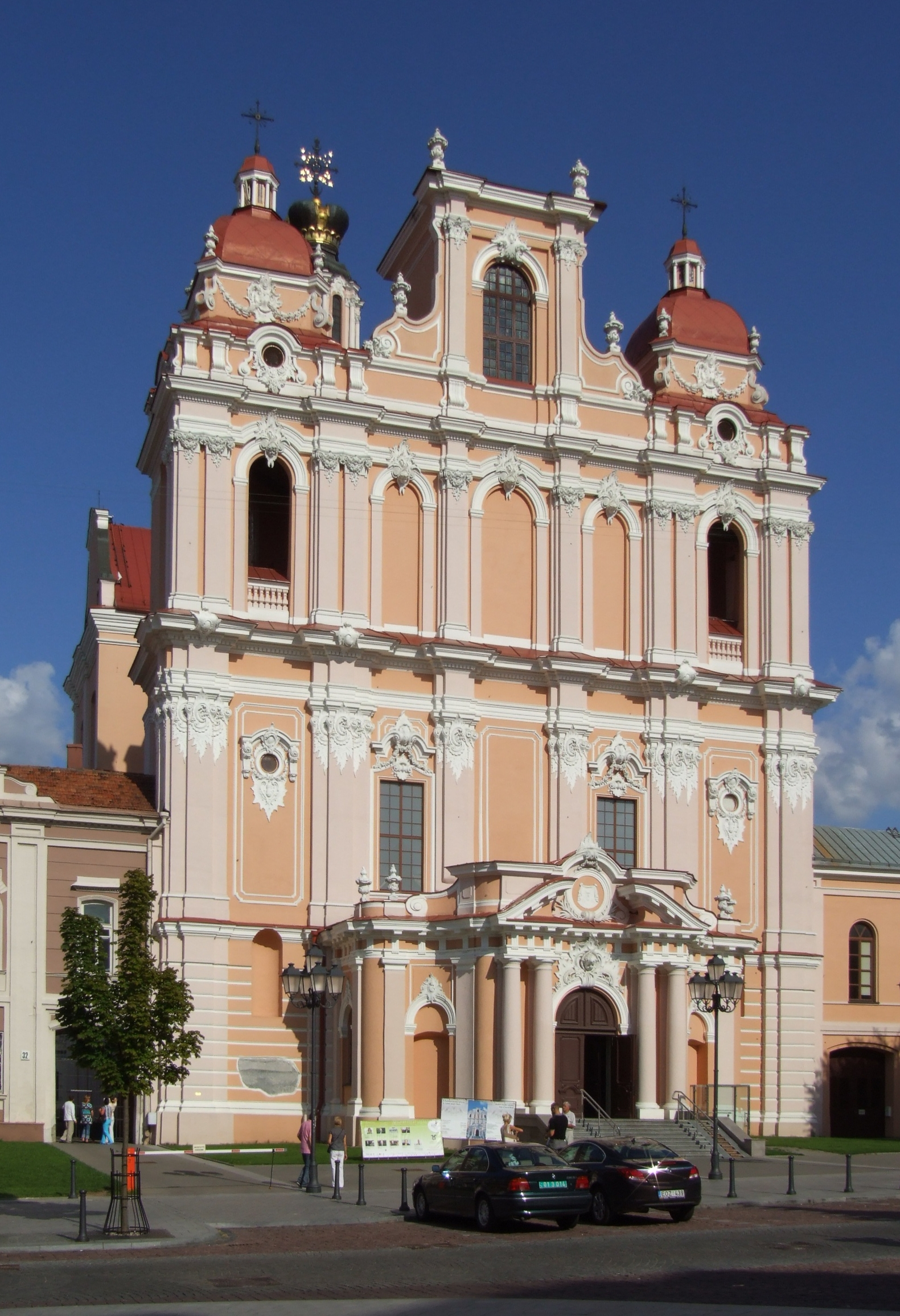
Professed house church, Vilnius

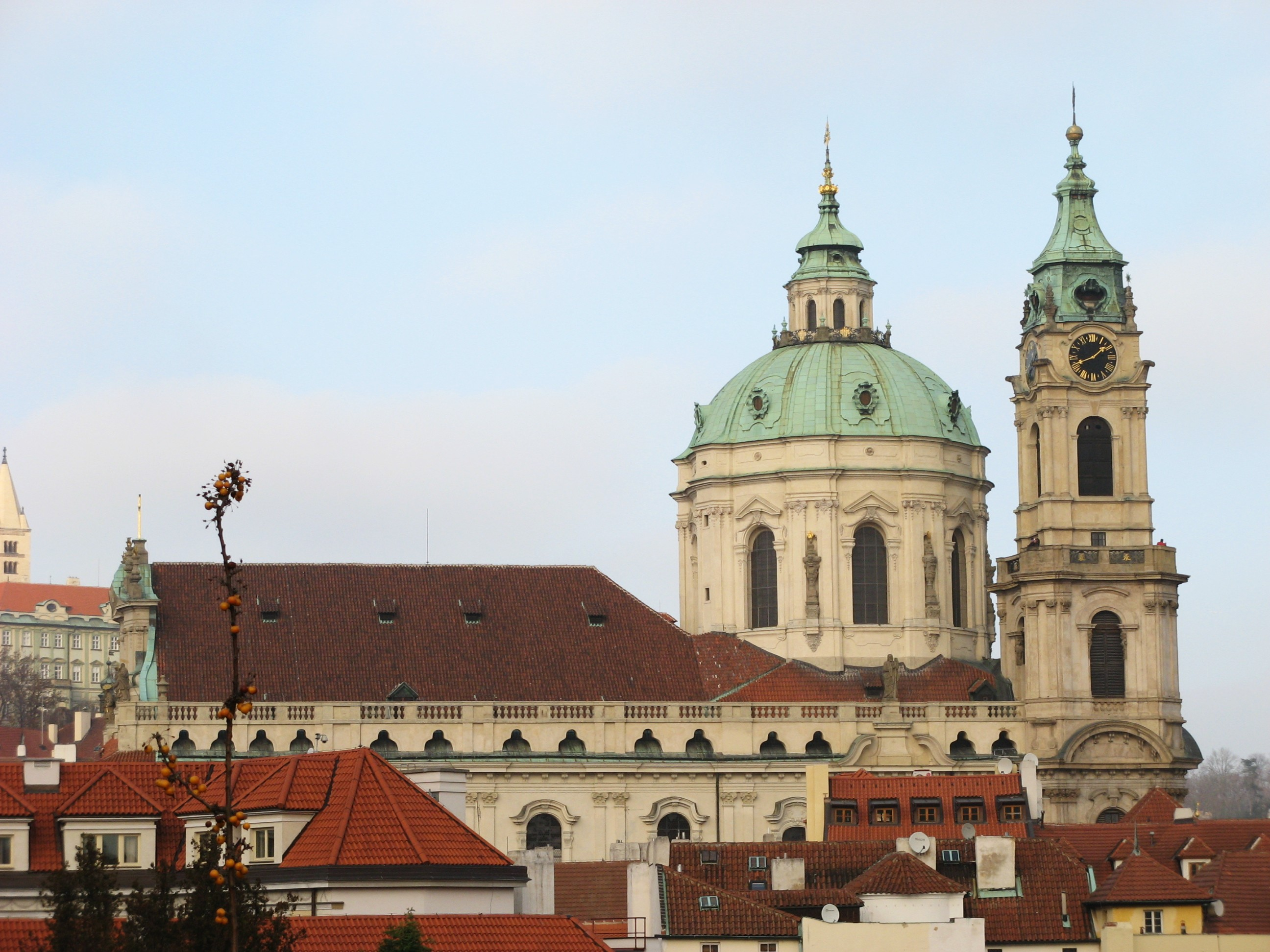
Professed house in Malá Strana, Prague

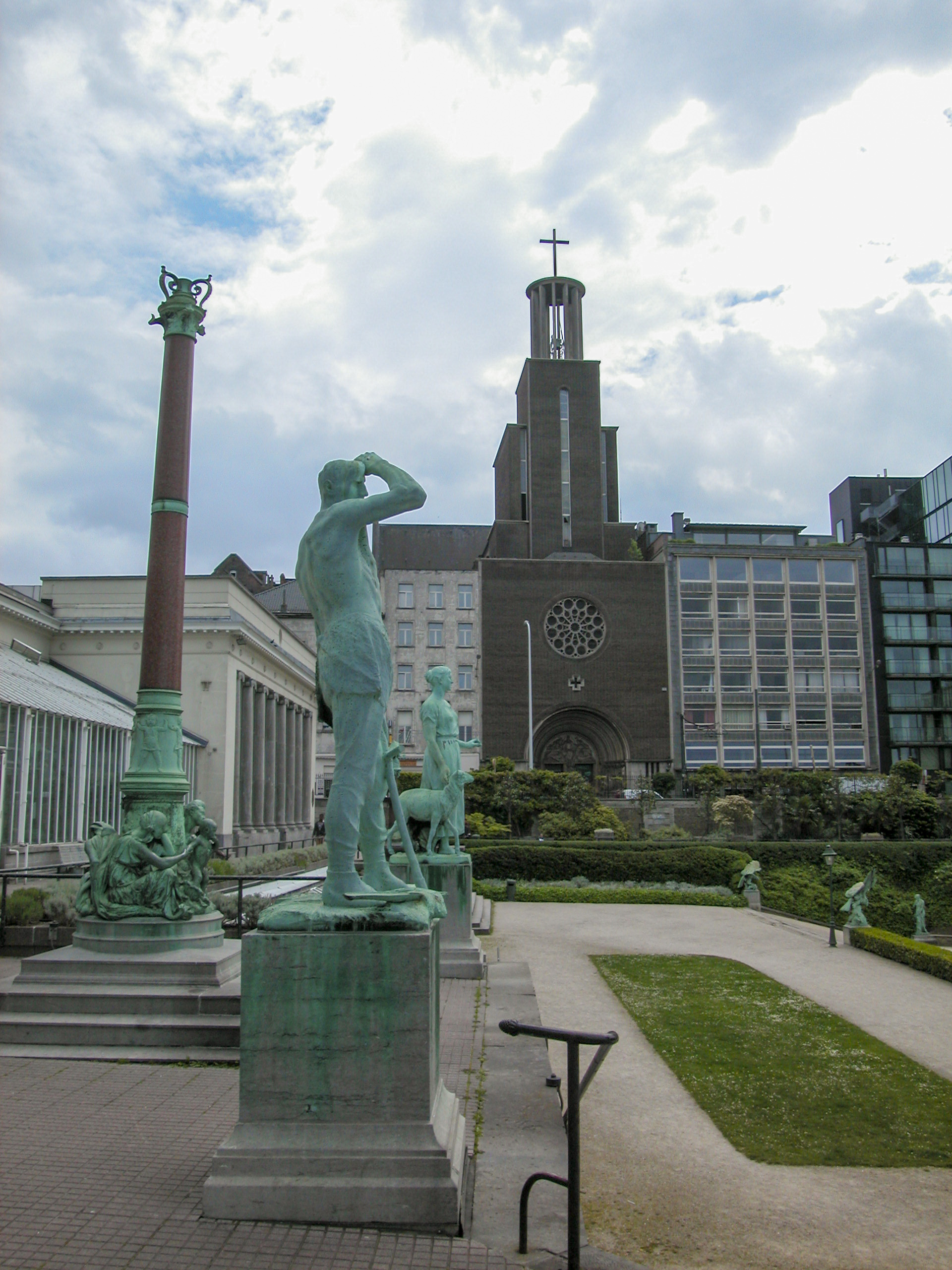
Church of the Gesù, Brussels

This list includes past and present buildings, facilities and institutions associated with the Society of Jesus. In each country, sites are listed in chronological order of start of the Jesuit association.

Nearly all these sites have been managed or maintained by Jesuits at some point of time since the Society's founding in the 16th century, with indication of the relevant period in parentheses; the few exceptions are sites associated with particularly significant episodes of Jesuit history, such as the Martyrium of Saint Denis in Paris, site of the original Jesuit vow on 15 August 1534. The Jesuits have built many new colleges and churches over the centuries, for which the start date indicated is generally the start of the project (e.g. invitation or grant from a local ruler) rather than the opening of the institution which often happened several years later. The Jesuits also occasionally took over a pre-existing institution and/or building, for example a number of medieval abbeys in the Holy Roman Empire.

In the third quarter of the 18th century, the suppression of the Society of Jesus abruptly terminated the Jesuit presence in nearly all facilities that existed at the time. Many of these, however, continued their educational mission under different management; in cases where they moved to different premises from the ones operated by the Jesuits, the Jesuit site is mentioned in the list as precursor to the later institution. Outside Rome, sites operated by Jesuits since the early 19th century are generally different from those before the 18th-century suppression. Later episodes of expulsion of the Jesuits also terminated their involvement in a number of institutions, e.g. in Russia in 1820, parts of Italy at several times during the 19th century, Switzerland in 1847, Germany in 1872, Portugal in 1910, China after 1949, Cuba in 1961, or Haiti in 1964.

The territorial allocation across countries uses contemporary boundaries, which often differ from historical ones. An exception is made for Rome which is highlighted at the start. Similarly and for simplicity, only modern place names are mentioned, spelled as on their main Wikipedia page in English, even in cases where those modern names were never in use during the time of local Jesuit involvement.

== Europe ==
=== Rome ===
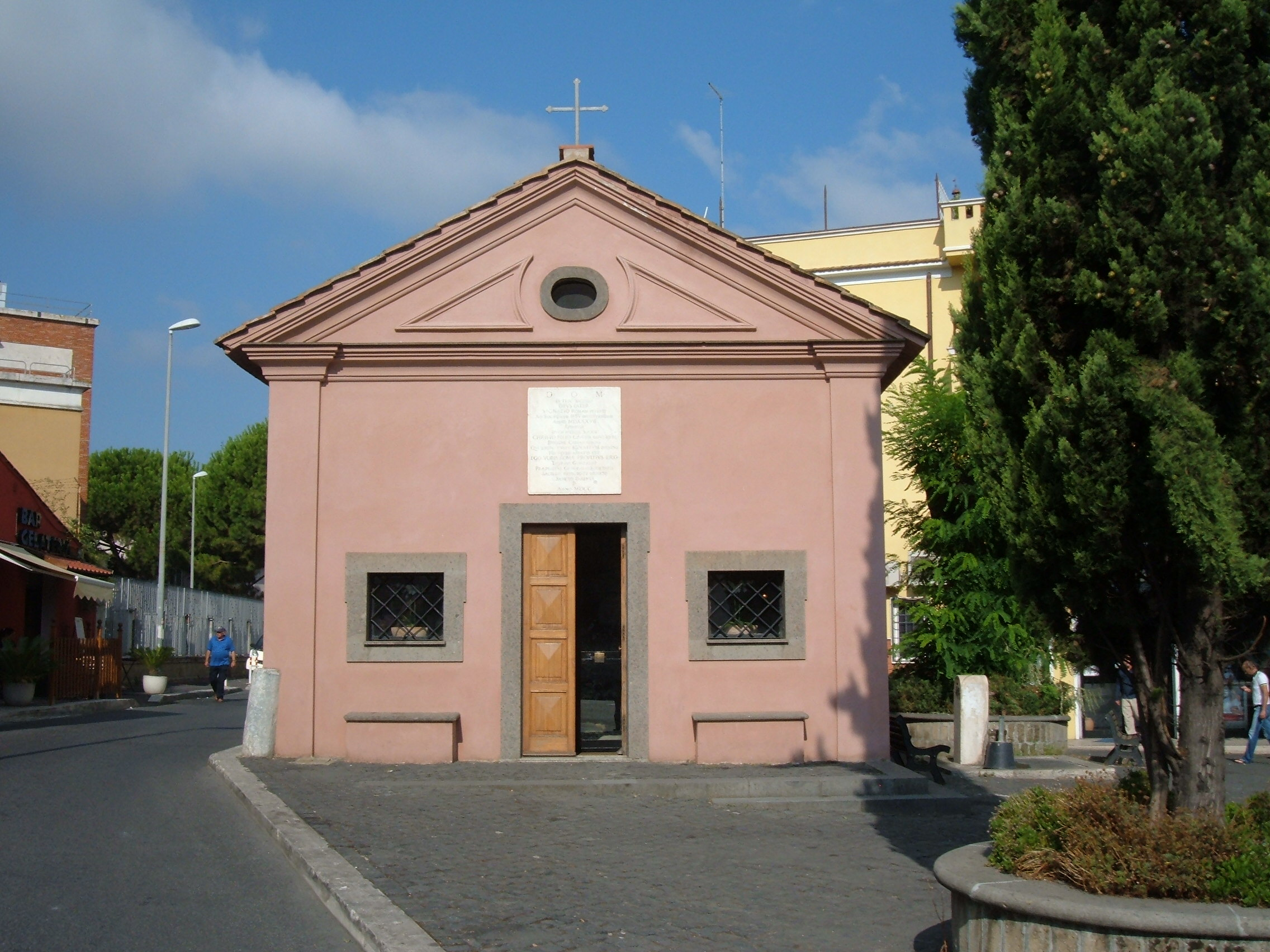
Chapel of La Storta

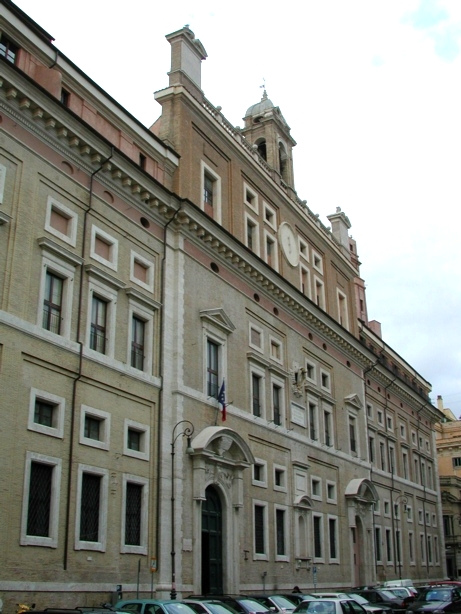
Historic building of Collegio Romano

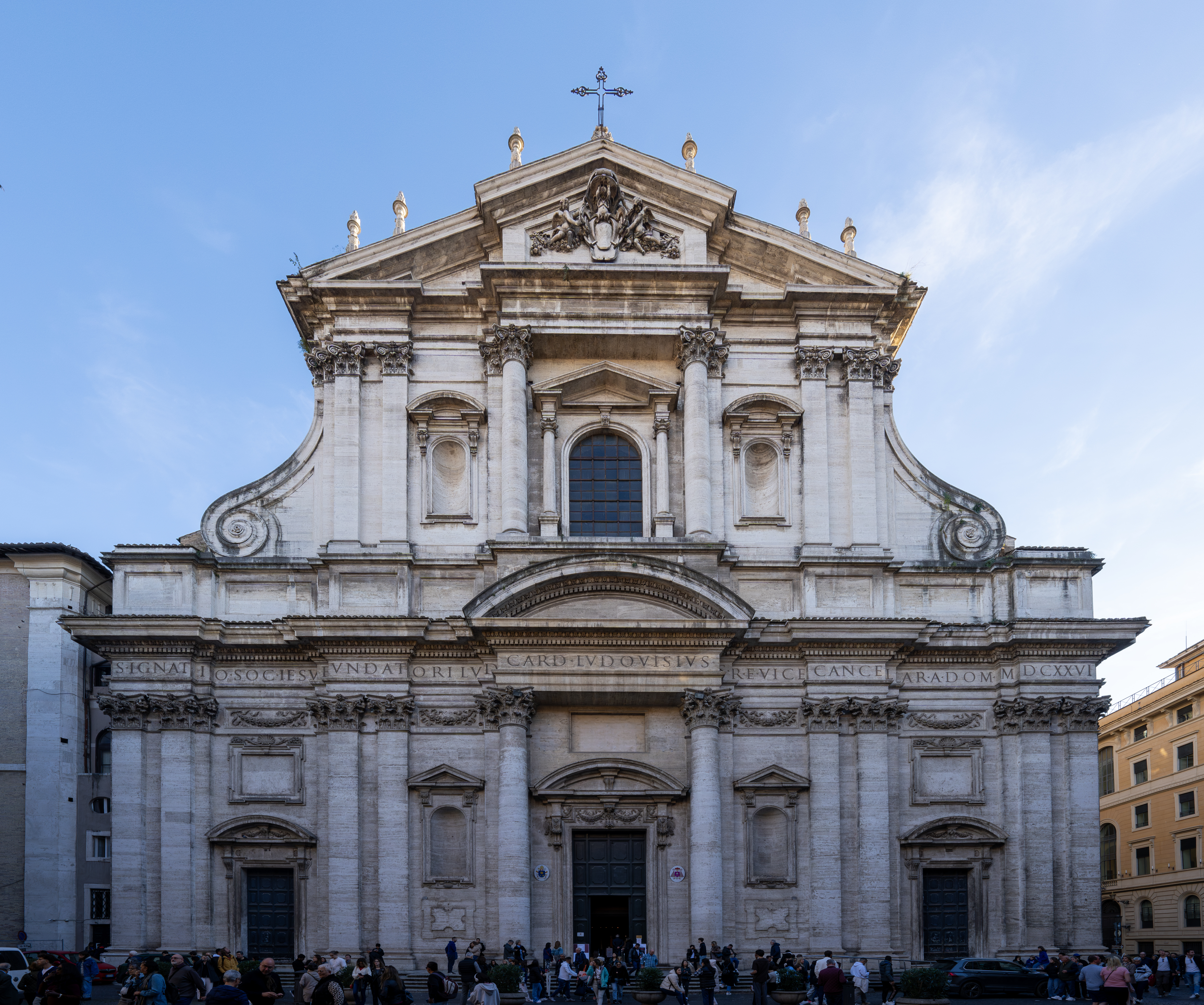
Church of Sant'Ignazio

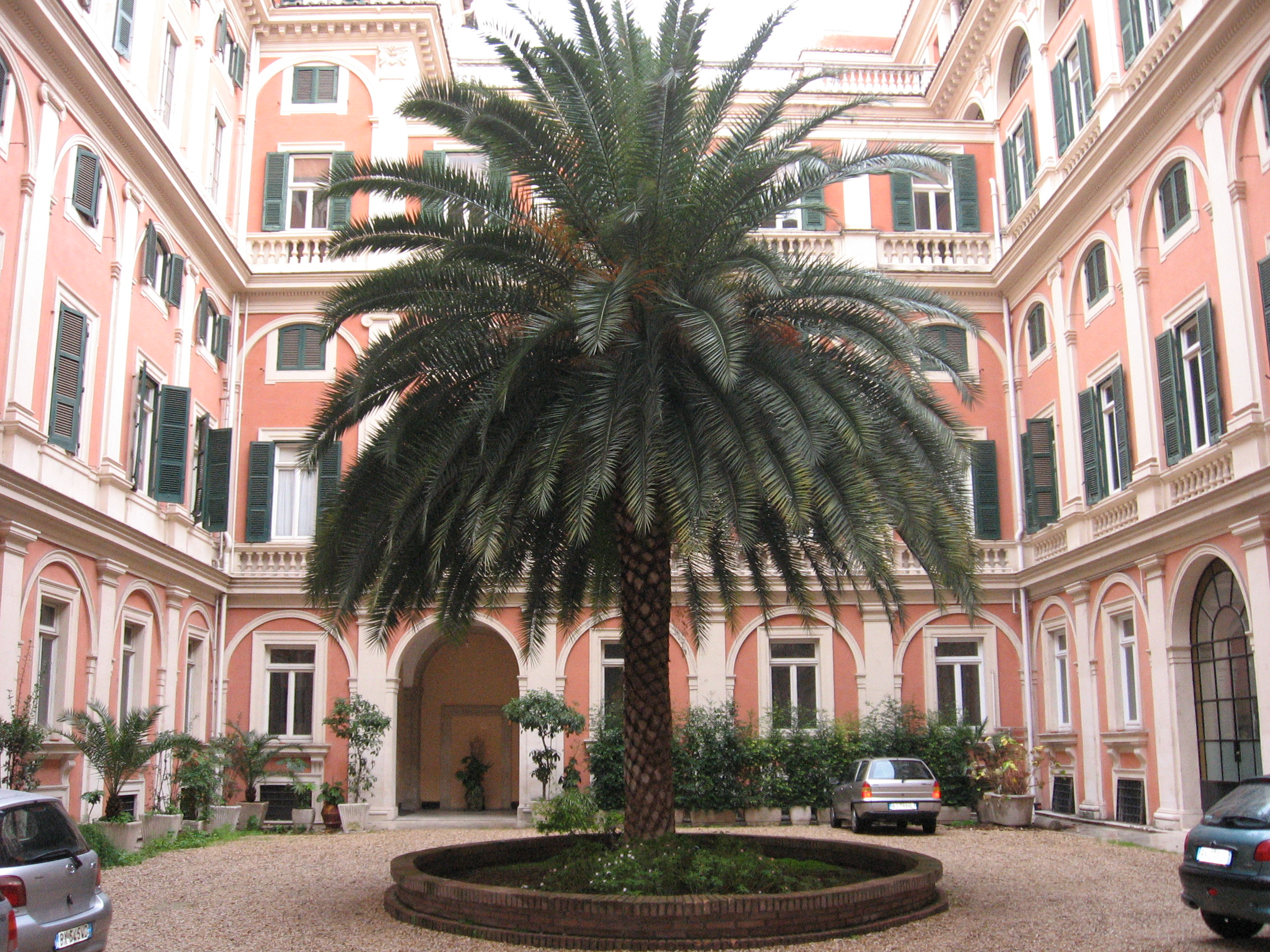
Palazzo Gabrielli Borromeo

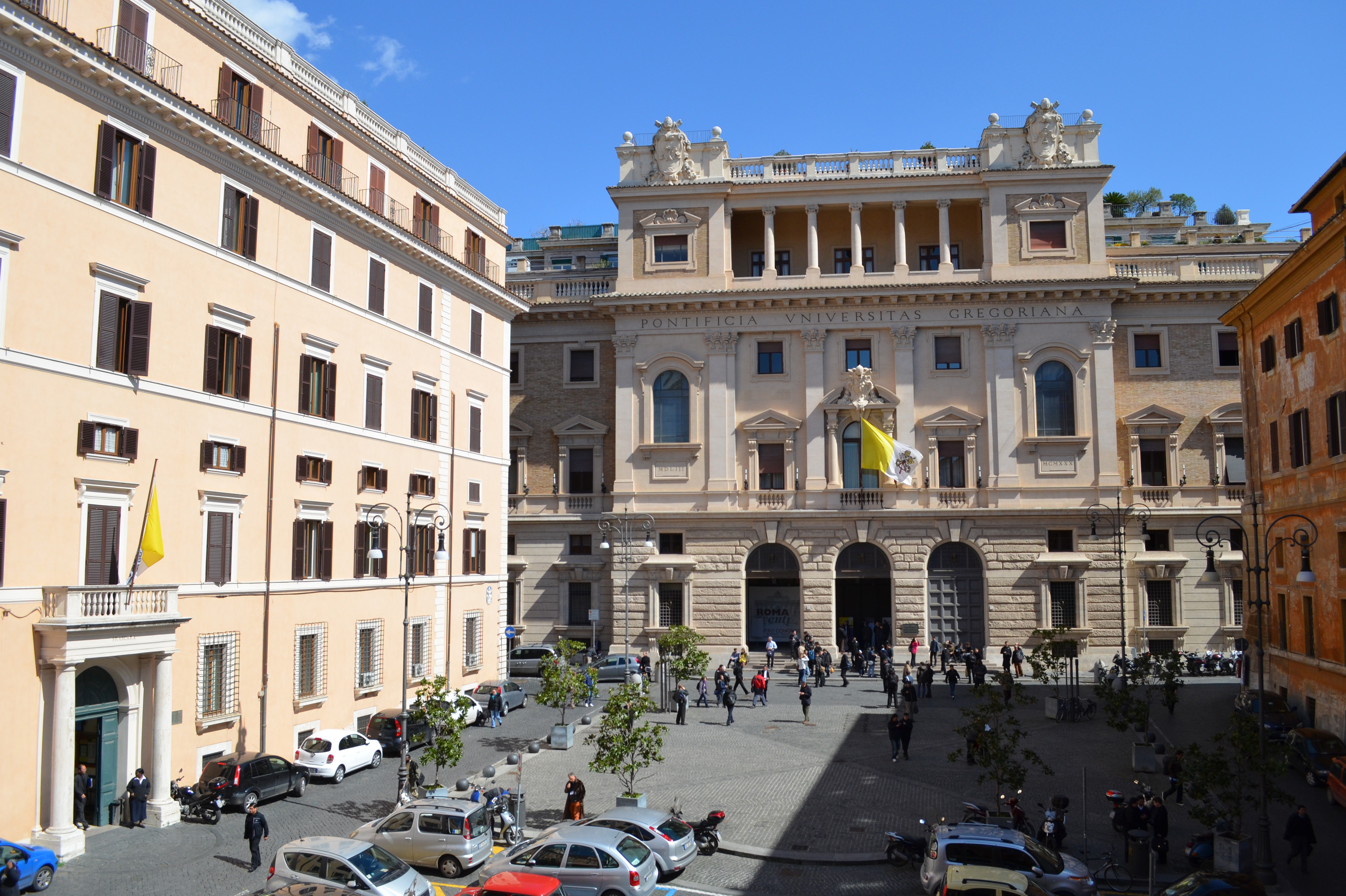
Gregorian University

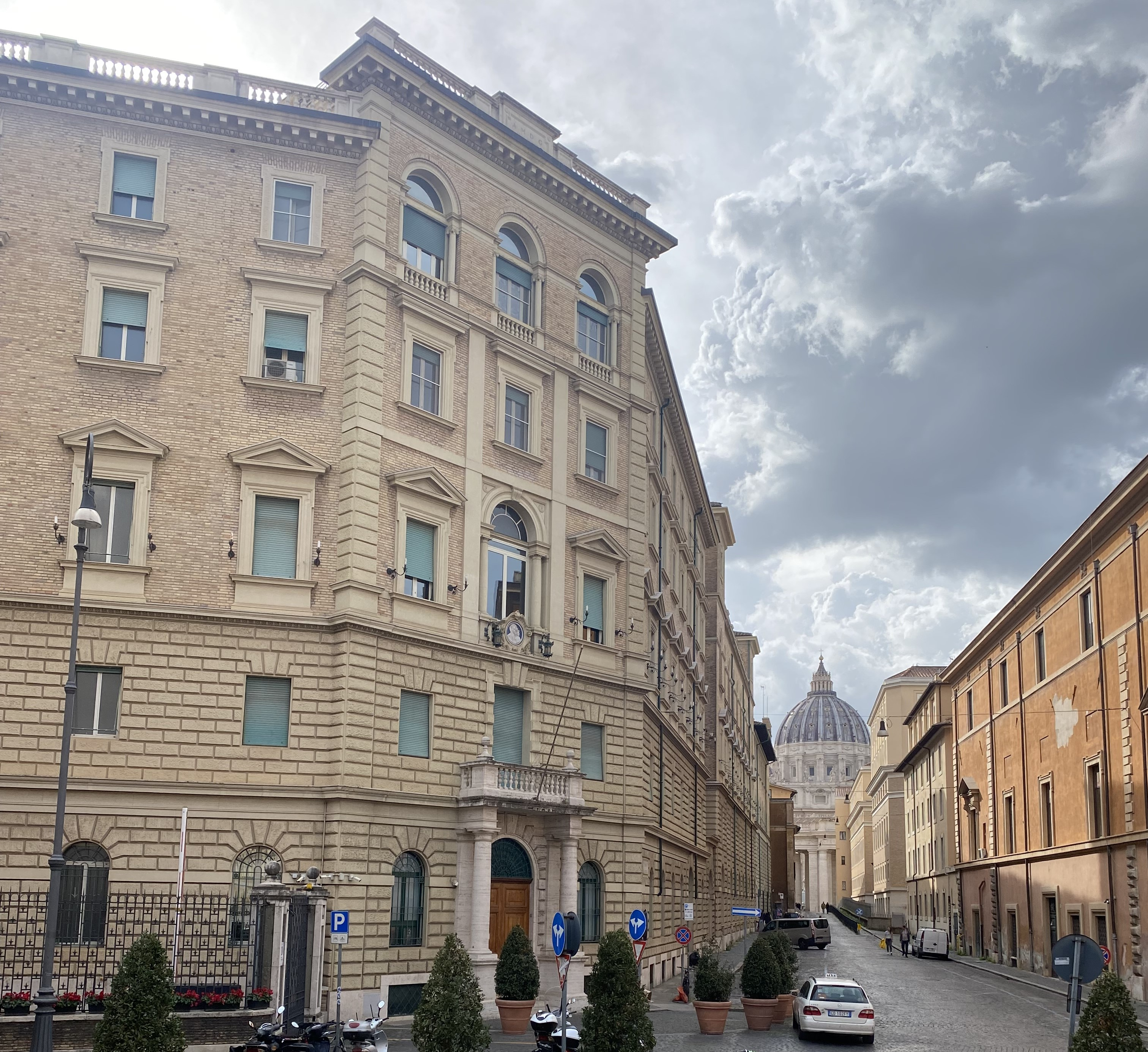
Casa Generalizia of the Jesuit Order

- Chapel of the vision of Saint Ignatius in La Storta district, site of the Ignatius of Loyola's vision in 1537
- Professed house and mother church (1540–1773 and since 1814), now Church of the Gesù; burial place of Peter Faber, Ignatius of Loyola, and numerous later Jesuit leaders
  - The rooms where Ignatius of Loyola had lived next to the earlier Church of Santa Maria della Strada were preserved during the Gesù's construction and are still extant
- House of Saint Martha established by Ignatius of Loyola (1543–1560), now Santa Marta al Collegio Romano
- Roman College (1551–1773 and since 1814), renamed in 1873 Pontifical Gregorian University
  - Ignatius created the School of Grammar, Humanities and Christian Doctrine, which was premised in successive locations near his professed house: initially on Piazza d'Aracoeli, then behind the Church of Santo Stefano del Cacco, then in 1558 in a house behind Church of Santa Maria in Via Lata which since gave way to Piazza del Collegio Romano
  - The college's eponymous building was built and used by the Jesuits from 1584 to 1870 with successive expansions and interruptions in 1773–1824 and 1848–1850; it now mainly hosts the Ennio Quirino Visconti Lyceum-Gymnasium
    - The college's chapel is now the Church of Saint Ignatius, burial place of Aloysius Gonzaga and Robert Bellarmine
    - The Oratory of Saint Francis Xavier "del Caravita" (1631–1773, 1814–1925 and since 2000) was commissioned by the Jesuits on an adjacent lot
    - from 1651 the college housed the Kircherian Museum, sometimes viewed as the world's first museum
  - The college was renamed Pontifical Gregorian University in 1873. Between that date and 1930 it was located in Palazzo Gabrielli-Borromeo, across the street from Sant'Ignazio
    - The Palazzo Gabrielli-Borromeo also hosted the German College from 1873 to 1886, and the Order's General Curia from 1895 to 1927. It is now home to the Collegio Bellarmino, a Jesuit postgraduate institution
  - In 1879 the former College's secondary education role was revived in the Palazzo Massimo alle Terme, rebuilt in the 1880s by Jesuit aristocrat Massimiliano Massimo, now home of the National Roman Museum. In 1960 this operation moved to the EUR neighborhood and is now the Massimiliano Massimo Institute
  - In 1930 the Gregorian University moved into its current premises on piazza della Pilotta
- Several of the Pontifical Colleges in Rome have been under Jesuit management for extended periods:
  - German College (1552–1773), renamed German and Hungarian College after its 1580 merger with the Hungarian college created in 1579
  - English College (1579–1773)
  - Pontifical Maronite College (1584–1773 and since 1893)
  - Greek College (1591–1604, 1622–1769 and 1890–1897)
  - Scots College (1615–1773)
  - Irish College (1635–1773)
  - Latin American College (since 1858)
  - Ukrainian College (1897–1904)
  - Russian College (since 1929)
  - Brazilian College (since 1934)
- Pontifical Roman Major Seminary (1565–1773), initially in the Roman College building and from 1608 in nearby Palazzo Gabrielli-Borromeo; in 1726 absorbed an adjacent church and rededicated it to Saint Malo (Macuto in Italian), now the Church of San Macuto
- Novitiate on Quirinal Hill (1566–1773, 1814–1873 with an interruption in 1849, and since 1925), now Sant'Andrea al Quirinale, burial place of Stanislaus Kostka
- Gregorian Tower of the Vatican Palace, original Vatican Observatory, run mostly by Jesuits since 1582
- Pontifical Urban University (1836–1848)
- Residenza San Pietro Canisio or "The Canisio" (since 1900), formerly a villa of the Barberini family
- Pontifical Biblical Institute (since 1909)
- Pontifical Oriental Institute (since 1917), initially hosted in Palazzo dei Convertendi until 1926
- Casa Generalizia adjoining the Canisio residence (since 1927), seat of the order's General Curia, of the Jesuit Refugee Service and of the Jesuit Library (Biblioteca Hans Peter Kolvenbach)
  - Under the Lateran Treaty of 1929, the Jesuit headquarters and Canisio Residence are properties of the Holy See, known in Rome as Zona Extraterritoriale
- Church of San Roberto Bellarmino in the Parioli neighborhood (since 1931)
- Vatican Radio has been run by Jesuits since its creation in 1931
- Villa Malta on Pincio Hill, headquarters of Jesuit periodical La Civiltà Cattolica (since 1951)
- John Felice Rome Center, Rome campus of Loyola University Chicago (since 1962)

=== Albania ===
- Albanian Pontifical Seminary in Shkodër (1859–1946 and since 1991)
- Xavier College, now Pjetër Meshkalla High School in Shkodër (1877–1944 and since 1994)
- Sacred Heart Church in Tirana (1938–1967)

=== Austria ===
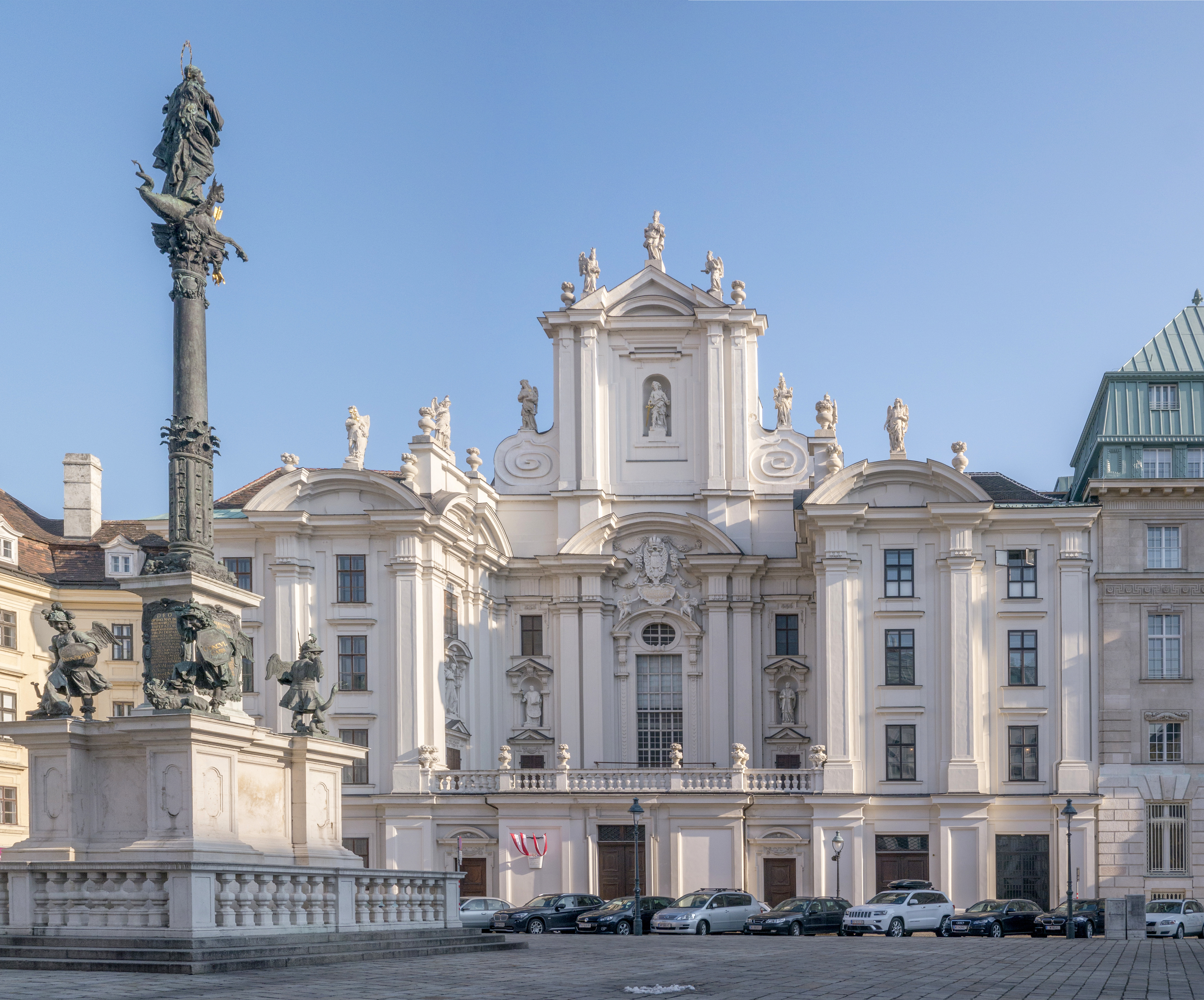
Church am Hof, Vienna

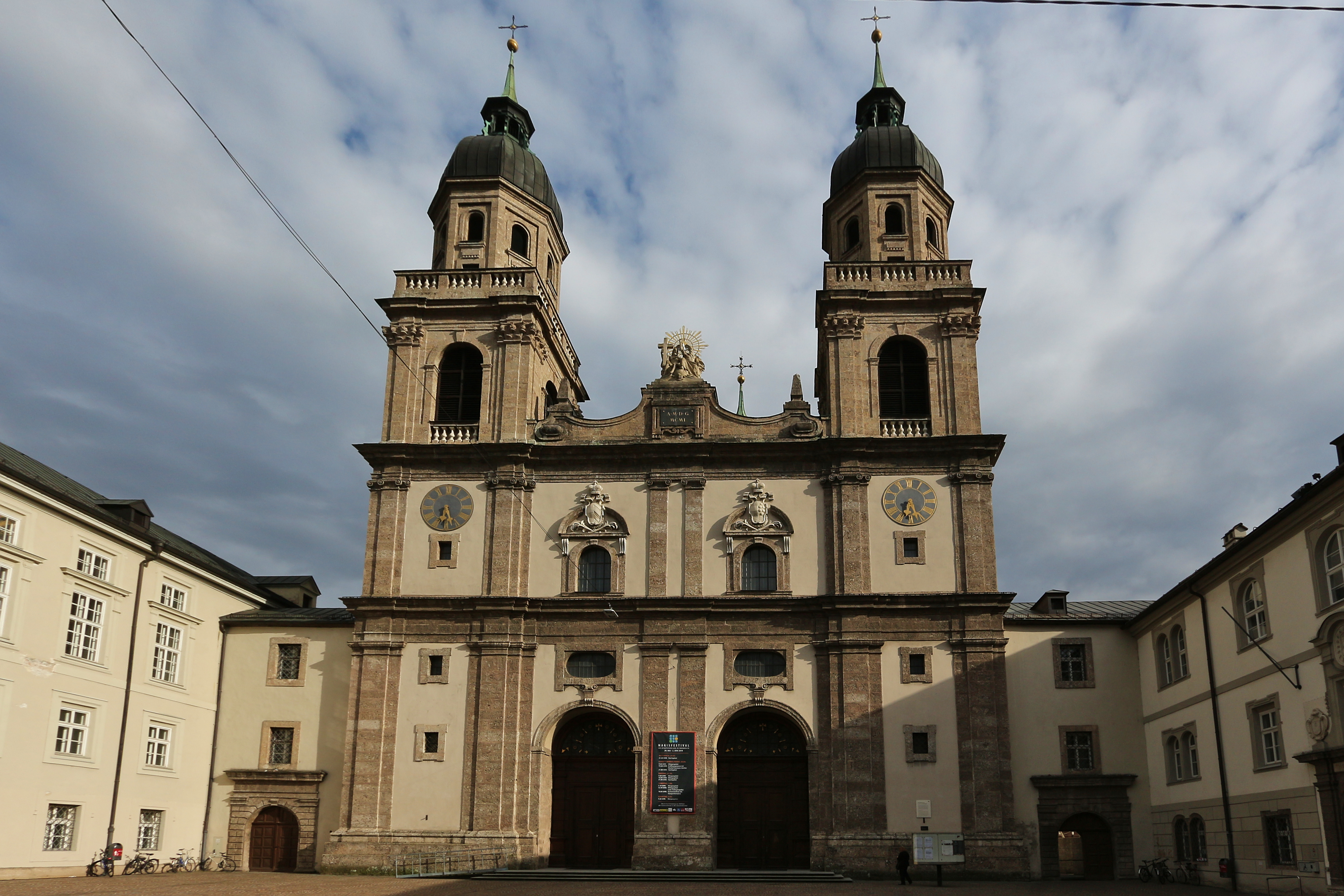
College church, Innsbruck

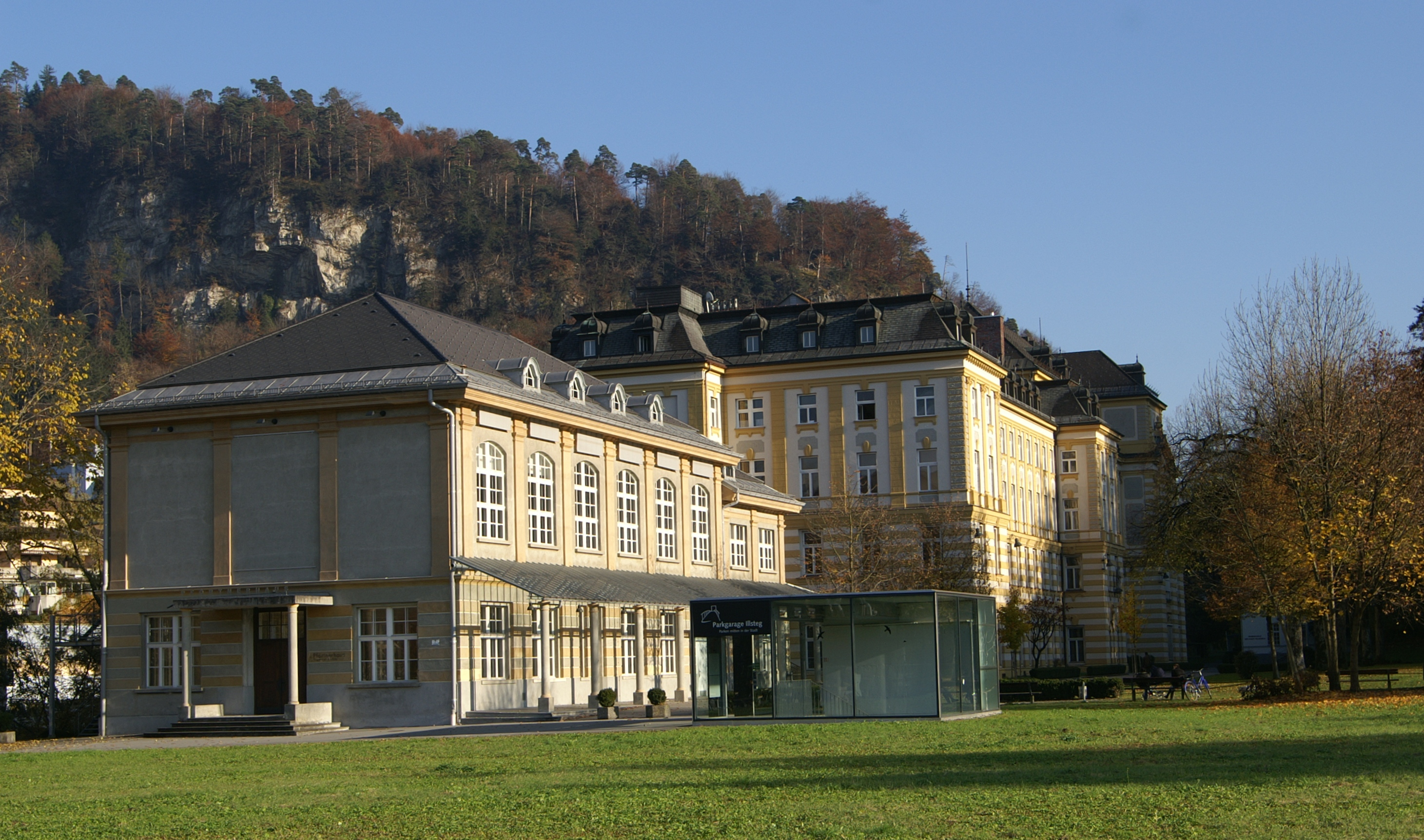
Stella Matutina, Feldkirch

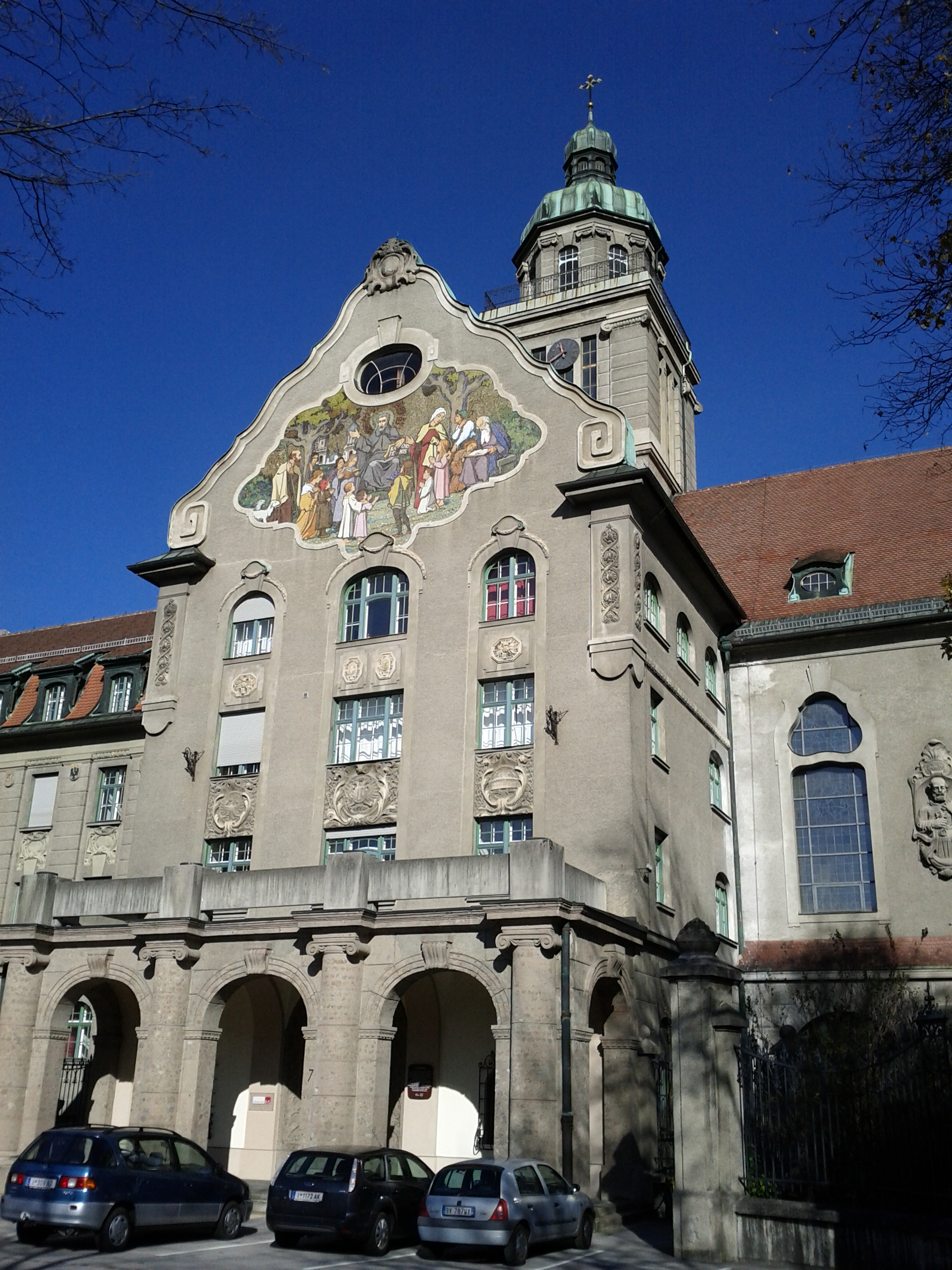
Canisius College, Innsbruck

- Jesuit college in Vienna (1553–1767), now seat of the Ordinariate for Byzantine-rite Catholics in Austria and Saint Barbara Church; precursor to the Akademisches Gymnasium
- Professed house in Vienna (1554–1773 and 1814–1852), now Vienna Park Hyatt hotel and Church am Hof
- Jesuit college in Innsbruck (1562–1773 and 1839–1848), now Akademisches Gymnasium and Jesuit Church
- Jesuit college in Hall in Tirol (1573–1773), now a convent and the Church of the Jesuits; precursor to Franziskanergymnasium Hall in Tirol
- Jesuit college in Graz (1576–1773), University from 1585, now Akademisches Gymnasium; the non-adjacent college church has been Graz Cathedral since 1786
- Jesuit novitiate in Vienna (1582–1773), now St.-Anna-Hof and Church of Saint Anna
- Saint Bernhard Abbey in Sankt Bernhard-Frauenhofen (1586–1773)
- Jesuit residence in Millstatt Abbey (1598–1773)
- Jesuit college in Wiener Neustadt (?–1773), now City archive and Vorstadtkirche
- Church of the Minorites in Linz (1602–1678)
- Jesuit college in Klagenfurt (1604–1773), now Europagymnasium Klagenfurt; the church used by the Jesuits is now Klagenfurt Cathedral
- Eberndorf Abbey in Eberndorf (1604–1773)
- Jesuit college at Pulgarn Abbey in Steyregg (c.1610–1773)
- Jesuit college in Krems an der Donau (1616–1773), now a part of IMC University of Applied Sciences Krems and Church of the Piarists; precursor to Bundesgymnasium und Bundesrealgymnasium Krems
- Church on the Graz Calvary Hill (1619–1773)
- Traunkirchen Abbey in Traunkirchen (1622–1773)
- University of Vienna (1623–1773), including the Jesuit Church which has been again under Jesuits' care since 1856
  - The Vienna Observatory started there in the 1750s before moving to its current premises in 1883
- Jesuit college in Steyr (1632–1773), now Church of Saint Michael
- Pernau Abbey in Burgenland (c.1640–1773)
- Stella Matutina School in Feldkirch, Vorarlberg (1649–1773, 1856–1938, and 1946–1979), now Vorarlberger Landeskonservatorium; precursor to Bundesgymnasium und Bundesrealgymnasium Feldkirch
- Rosenhain Jesuit retreat in Geidorf near Graz (1654–1773), now a ruin
- Parish Church of Saint Francis Xavier in Leoben (1660–1773)
- Saint Ignatius Church in Linz (1669–1773), since 1783 Old Cathedral
- Theresianum boarding school in Vienna (1746–1773)
- Aloysian College in Linz (since 1837, with interruption 1897–1912)
- Baumgartenberg Abbey in Baumgartenberg (1852–1865)
- Kalksburg College in Vienna (since 1856, with interruption 1938–1947)
- Collegium Canisianum in Innsbruck (since 1857, with interruption 1938–1945)
- Novitiate in Sankt Andrä (1859–1969, with interruption 1938–1945); St. Andrew's Church was under Jesuit care from 1945 to 2007
- Marienkirche in Steyr (1865–2019)
- Church of Saint Peter Canisius in Vienna (since 1899)
- Kardinal König Haus in Vienna (since 2000)

=== Belarus ===
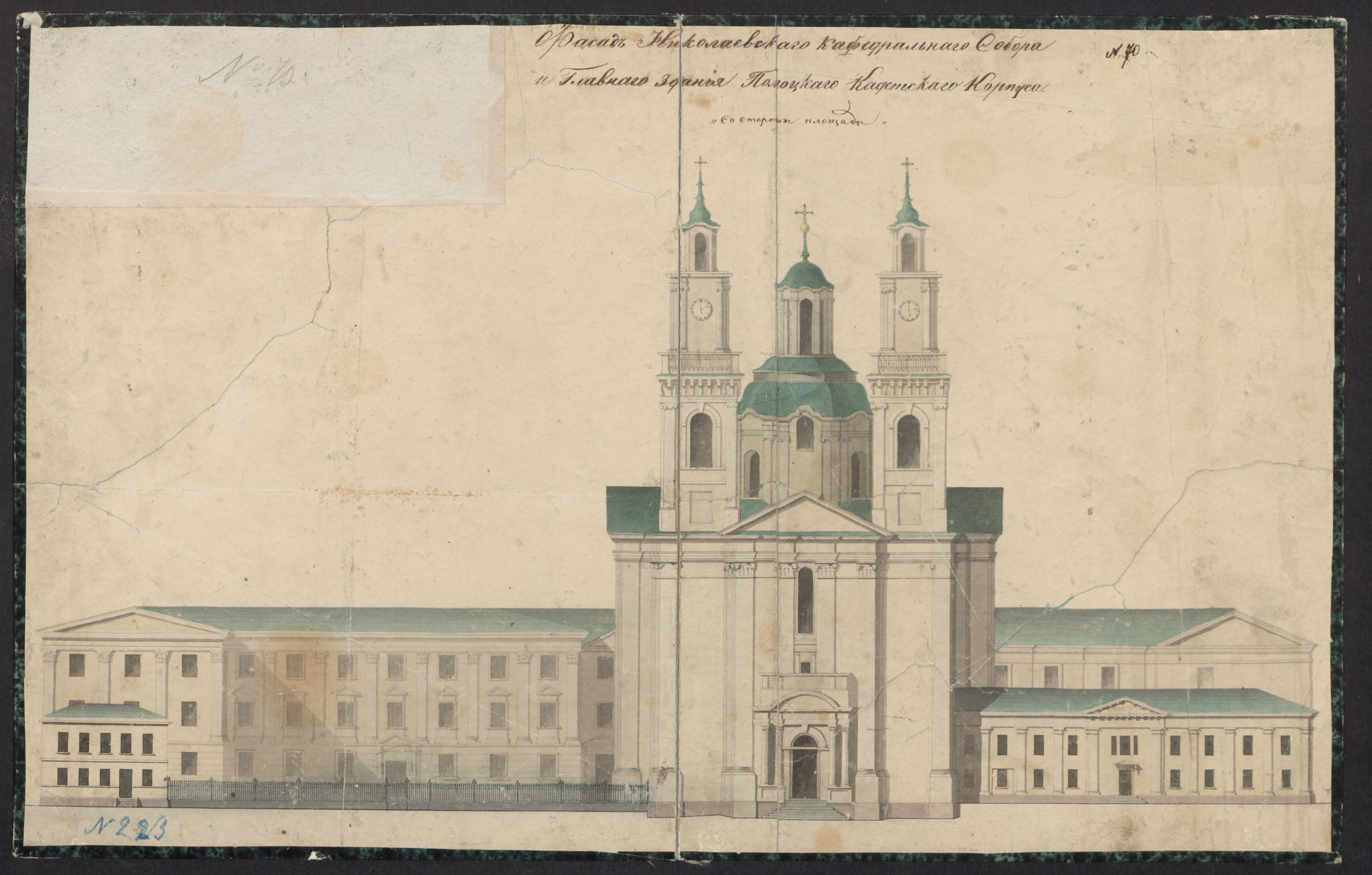
Jesuit College in Polotsk (1580–1820), site of the Jesuit curia during the Suppression of the Society of Jesus

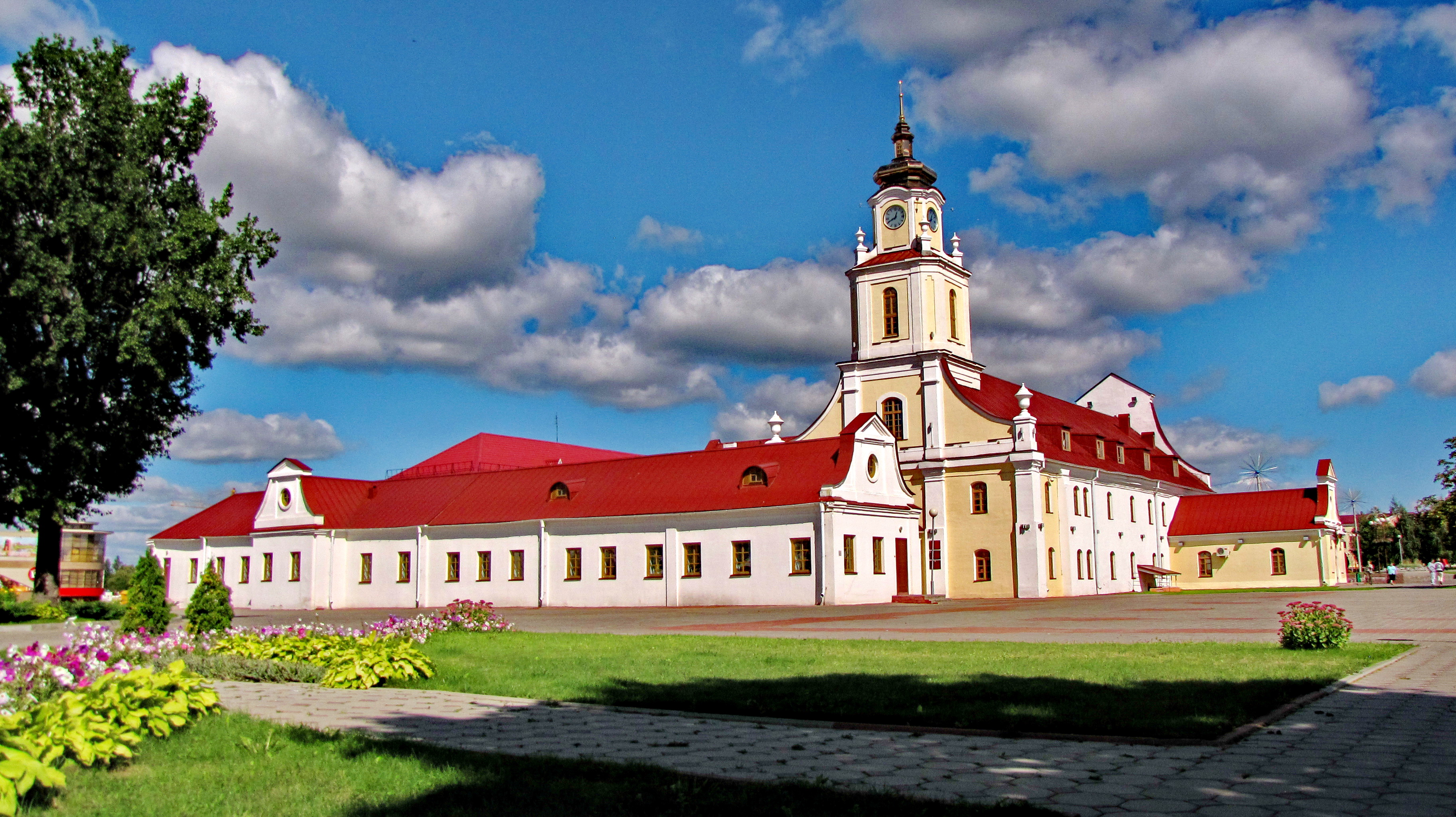
College in Orsha

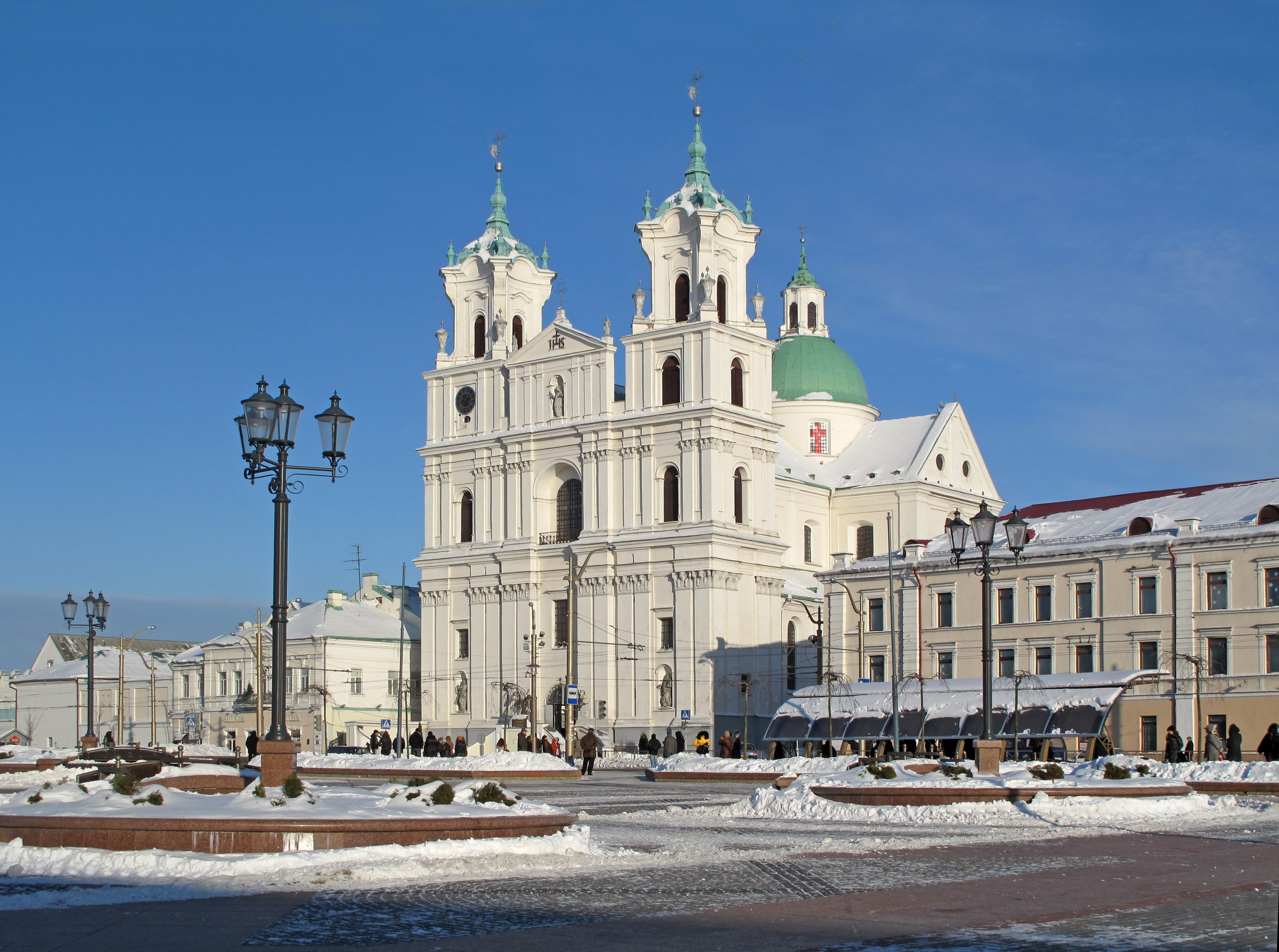
College church, Grodno

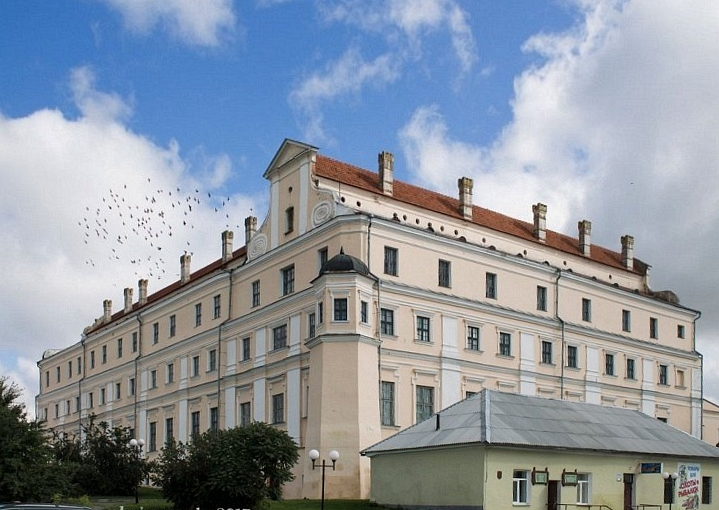
College in Pinsk

- Jesuit College in Polotsk (1580–1820), from 1812 an academy, seat of the Order's General Curia from 1773 to 1820, now Polotsk State University; college church demolished in 1964
- Jesuit college in Nyasvizh (1584–1773), now Corpus Christi Church
- Jesuit college in Orsha (1610–1820), reconstructed in the early 21st century
- Jesuit residence in Babruysk (1618–1773, with interruptions), initially a mission until 1630
- Jesuit college in Grodno (1622–1773), now Catholic Cathedral of Saint Francis Xavier
- Jesuit college in Novogrudok (1626–1773), initially a mission and from 1631 to 1714 a residence, now demolished
- Jesuit college in Brest (1629–1773), now Brest Fortress; college church demolished in the mid-20th century
- Jesuit college in Pinsk (1638–1773), now Belarusian Polesia Museum; college church demolished in the mid-20th century
- Jesuit college in Vitebsk (1640–1820), until 1682 a residence, later Catholic Church of Saint Joseph, demolished in the 1950s
- Jesuit College in Minsk (1654–1773), initially a mission and from 1686 to 1714 a residence, now Catholic Cathedral of the Holy Name of Mary; adjacent college buildings were demolished in the 1960s, except the Catholic consistory, and the reconstruction of the Governor's House was considered in 2019
- Jesuit college in Novaja Myš (1667–1693)
- Jesuit college in Juravičy (1673–1820), until 1778 a residence, now a Russian Orthodox monastery
- Jesuit college in Mogilev (1680–1820), until 1799 a residence, later Catholic Church of Saint Francis Xavier, demolished in the 1950s
- Jesuit college in Slutsk (1689–1773), initially a mission and from 1703 to 1714 a residence
- Jesuit college in Mstsislaw (1690–1820), initially a mission and from 1711 to 1799 a residence, now Catholic Church of St. Michael the Archangel
- Jesuit residence in Slonim (1709–1781)
- Jesuit college in Zhodishki (1722–1773)
- Jesuit mission in Mazyr (c.1725–1773)
- Eastern Catholic Jesuit seminary in Albertyn Mansion near Slonim (1924–1939)

=== Belgium ===
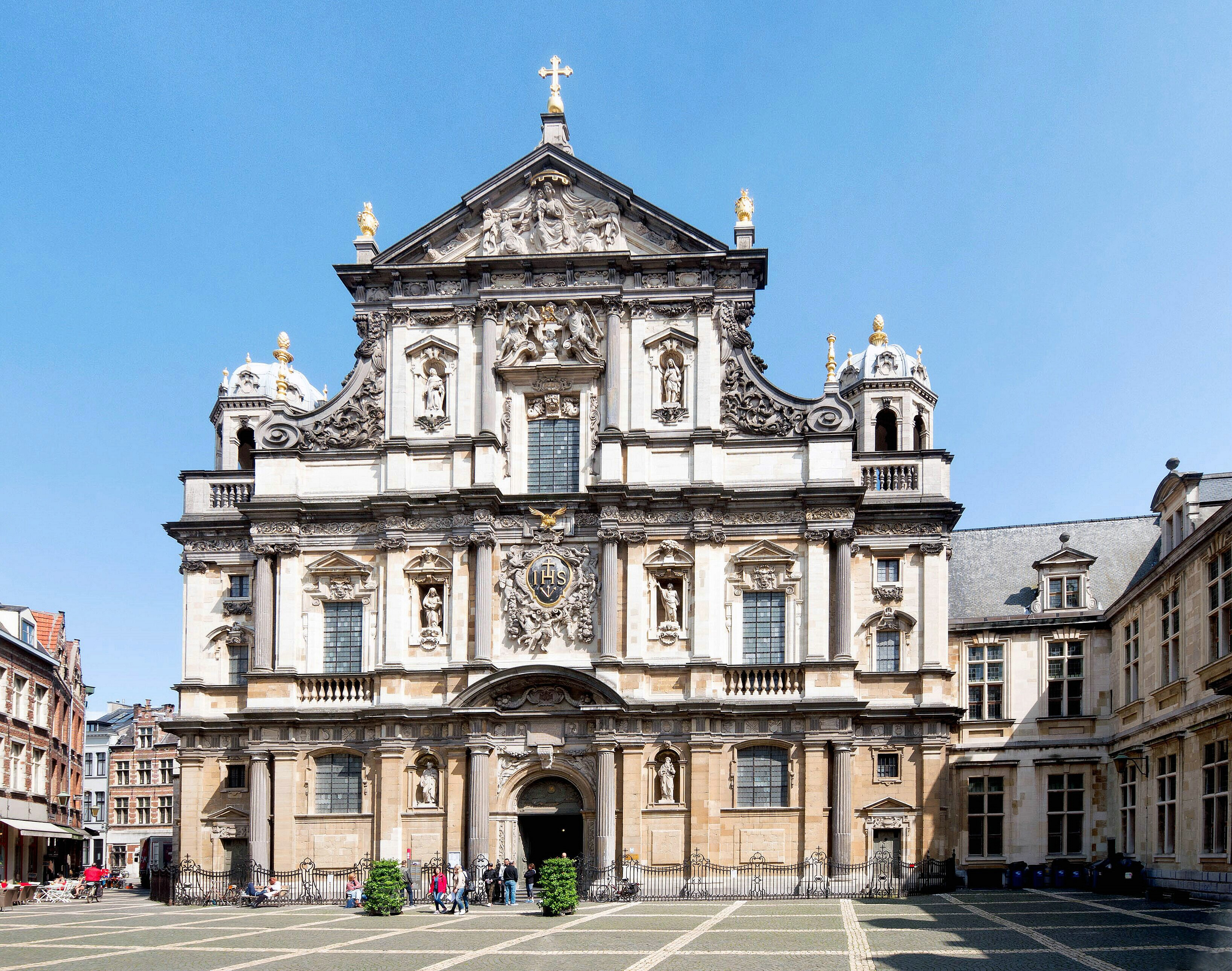
College church, Antwerp

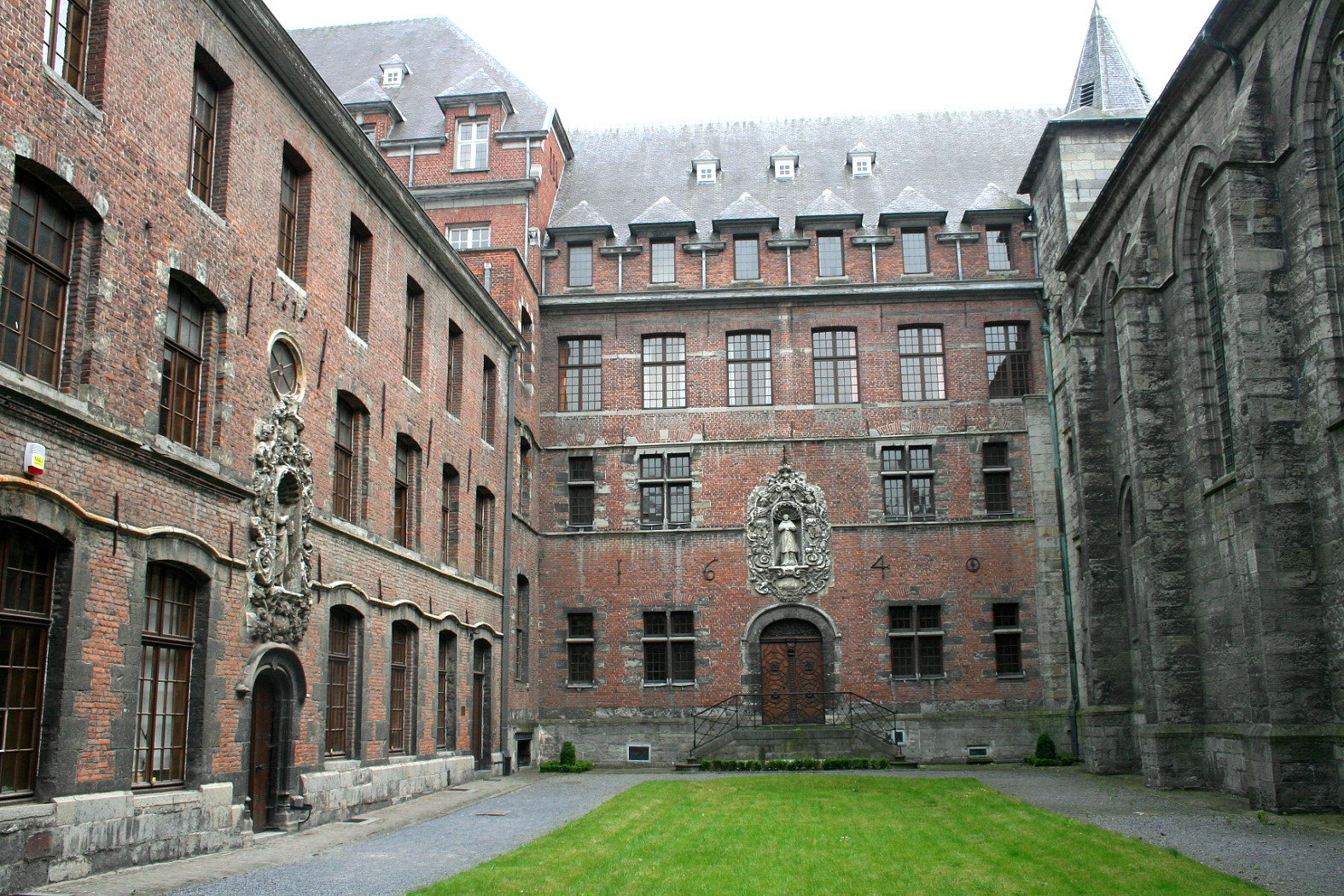
College courtyard, Tournai

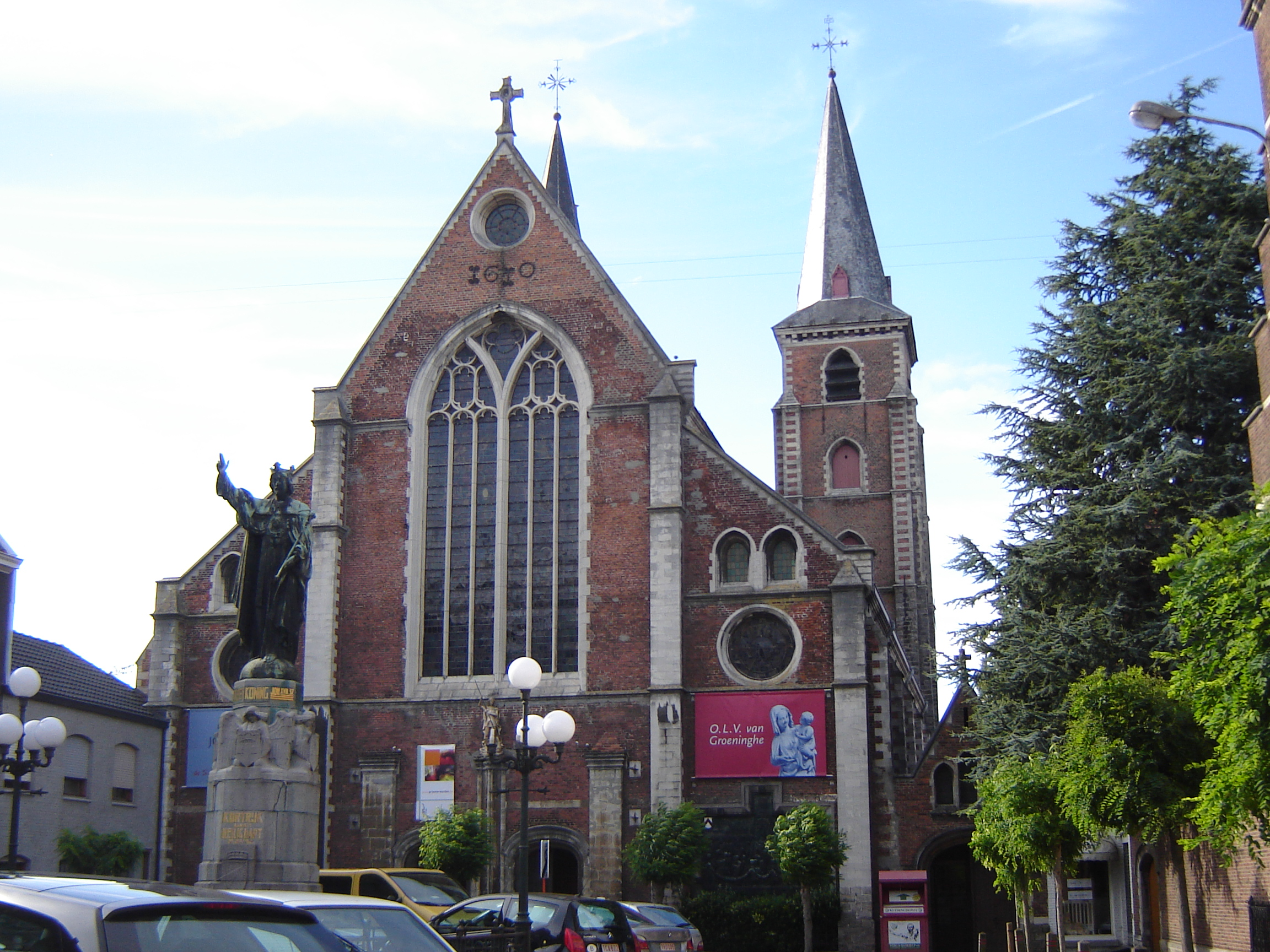
College church, Kortrijk

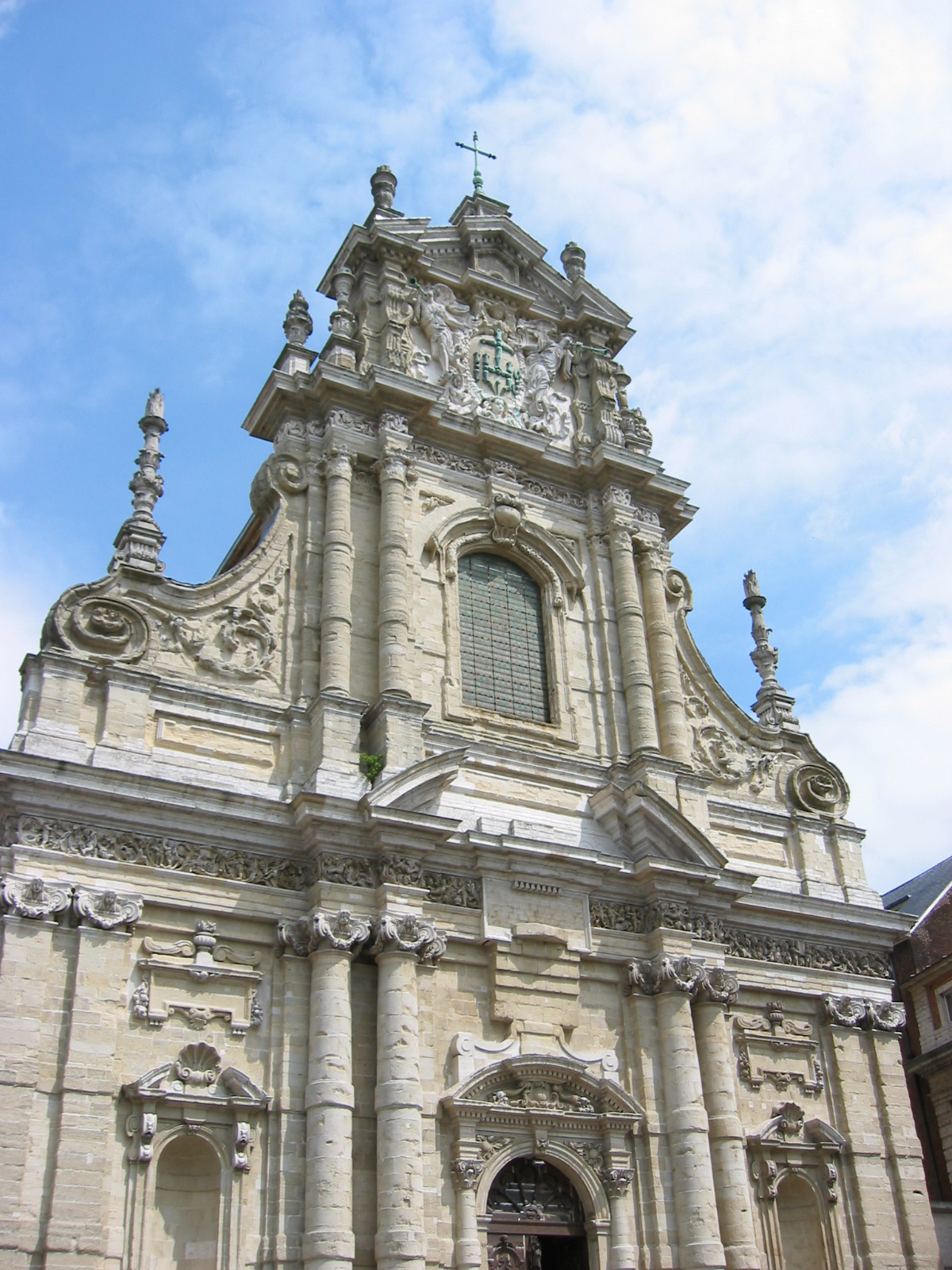
College church, Leuven

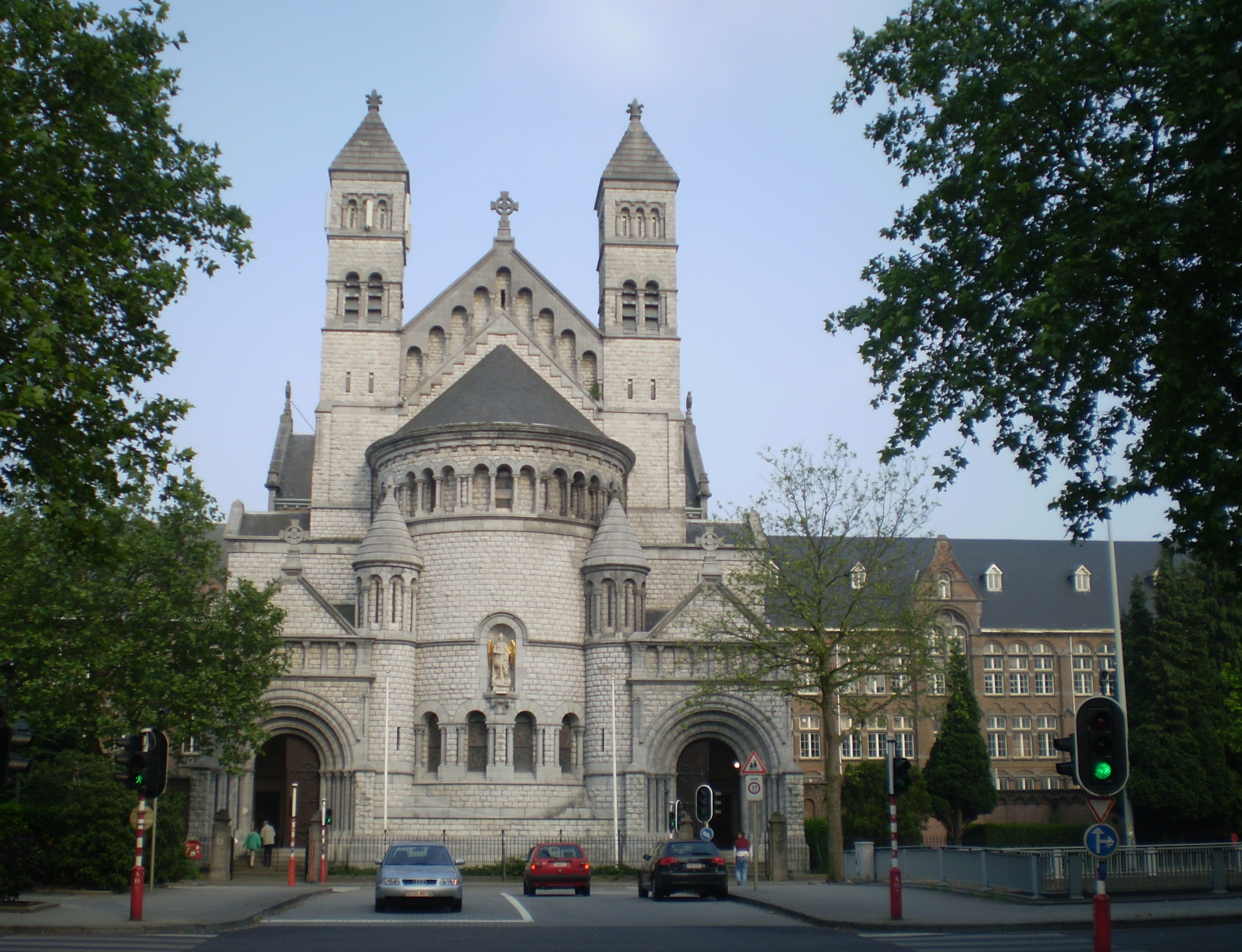
Saint Michael College, Brussels

- Jesuit college in Antwerp (1562–1773), now Church of St. Charles Borromeo
- Jesuit college in Tournai (1562–1773), now the Seminary of Tournai
- Church of Saints Peter and Paul (Saint-Séverin-en-Condroz) in Nandrin (1574–1773)
- Jesuit college known as the Collège en Isle in Liège (1582–1773), now University of Liège
- Jesuit college in Kortrijk (1583–1773), now Church of Saint Michael
- Jesuit college in Ypres (1585–1773)
- Jesuit college in Ghent (1585–1773), now campus of Ghent University
- Jesuit college in Brussels (1586–1773) on the location that is now Place de la Justice, with college church demolished in 1812
- Jesuit college in Leuven (1598–1773), now Church of Saint Michael and Maria-Theresia- en Veteranencollege
- Jesuit college in Bruges (1596–1773), now College of Europe and Church of Saint Walburga
- Jesuit college in Mons (1598–1773), demolished in the late 18C and replaced with Hôtel de Graty
- Jezuïetenhof villa near Leuven (early 17th century), now a retreat venue for KU Leuven
- Jesuit college in Namur (1610–1773), now Athénée royal François Bovesse and Church of Saint Lupus
- Jesuit novitiate in Mechelen (1611–1773), now Church of Saints Peter and Paul
- College of the English Jesuits in Liège (1614–1773), now offices of the Government of Wallonia
- Jesuit school, then college at Marche-en-Famenne (1620–1773), now a hotel with college church converted into a restaurant
- College of Saint Joseph in Aalst (1622–1773 and since 1831)
- Chapel of the English Jesuits at Chèvremont in Chaudfontaine (built 1688)
- Jesuit college in Lier (1749–1773), now Municipal Academy for Music, Word and Dance including the Jesuit Church converted into an arts venue
- College of Saint John Berchmans in Brussels (since 1814)
- Collège Notre-Dame de la Paix in Namur (since 1831), later developed into Université de Namur
  - Collège Saint-Paul (Godinne) opened in 1927 as a dormitory (internat) of the college
  - the Collège Notre-Dame de la Paix itself, as a middle school separate from the university, moved to its current campus in Erpent in 1971
- College of Saint Barbara in Ghent (since 1833)
- Church of Our Lady of Leliendaal in Mechelen (since 1834)
- Drongen Abbey in Ghent (since 1837)
- Collège Saint-Servais in Liège (since 1838)
- Second Jesuit college in Tournai (1839–1957)
- College of Our Lady in Antwerp (since 1840)
- Community of the Sacred Heart in Bruges (since 1840), including the Church of the Sacred Heart
- College of Saint Joseph in Turnhout (since 1845)
- Collège Saint-Stanislas in Mons (since 1845)
- Collège du Sacré-Cœur in Charleroi (since 1876)
- Saint-Ignatius School for Higher Education in Commerce in Antwerp (1852–2003), now merged into the University of Antwerp; Saint Ignatius University Centre was established in 2003 following the merger
- Collège Saint-François-Xavier in Verviers (since 1855)
- Jesuit novitiate in Arlon (1855–1967), now Church of the Sacred Heart
- Community of the Gesù, Brussels (1856-late 20th century), now Church of the Gesù
- College of Saint Louis in Liège (1892–1949)
- College of Saint Michael in Brussels (since 1905), including the Church of Saint John Berchmans
- Xaverius College in Borgerhout near Antwerp (since 1935)
- Centre international Lumen Vitae (since 1935), initially in Leuven, then in Brussels after 1946
- Catholic Office of Information and Initiative for Europe in Brussels (since 1956), known since 2012 as Jesuit European Social Centre
- University College of Saint John Berchmans in Heverlee near Leuven (since 1958)
- College of John of Ruysbroeck in Brussels (since 1968)
- La Pairelle, Ignatian Spirituality Centre, in Wépion near Namur (since 1971)
- Chapel of the Resurrection in the European Quarter of Brussels (since 2001)
- Collège Matteo Ricci, Brussels (since 2019)

=== Bosnia and Herzegovina ===
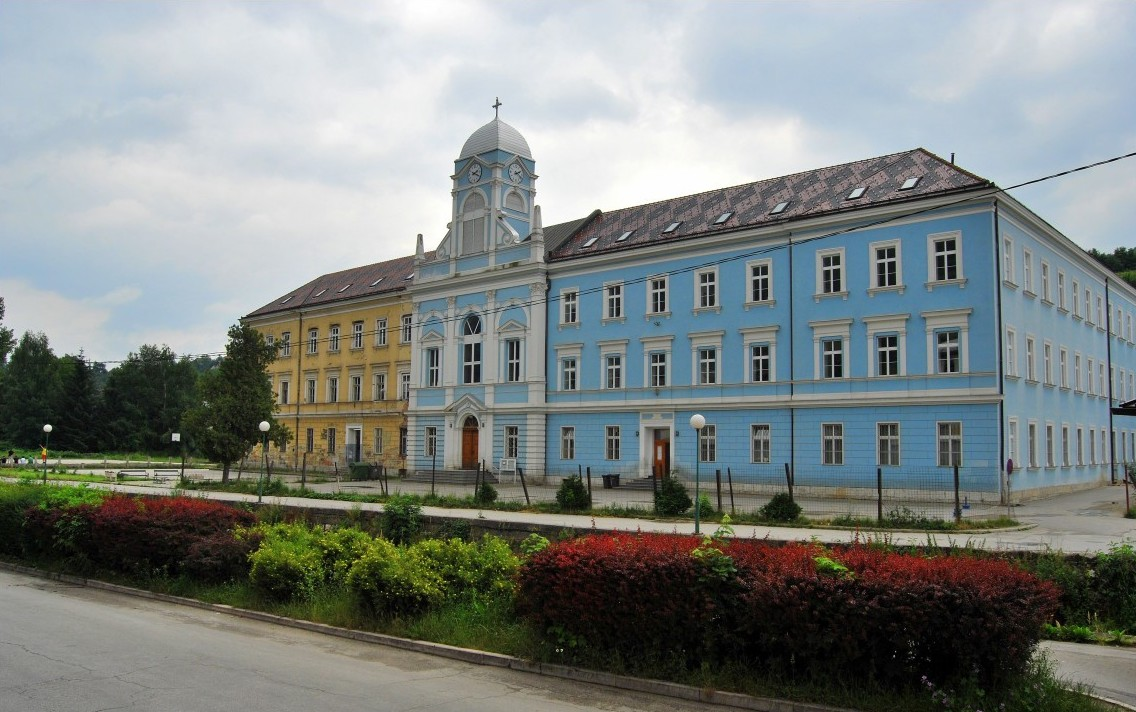
Seminary in Travnik

- Jesuit seminar, now Petar Barbarić Catholic School in Travnik (1882–1945 and since 1999)
- Church and Seminary of Saints Cyril and Methodius in Sarajevo (1893–1944)

=== Croatia ===
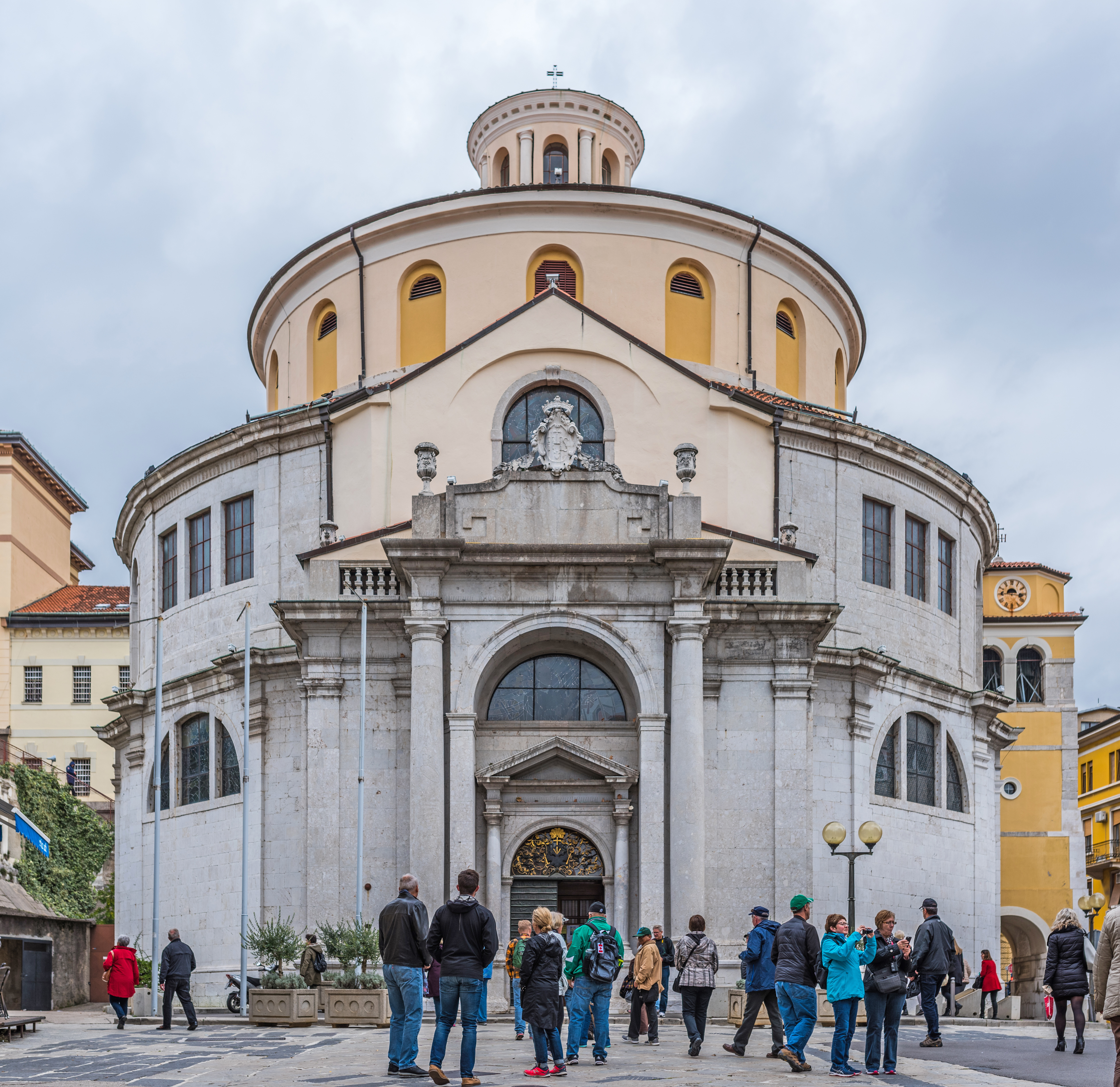
Jesuit church, Rijeka

- Jesuit college in Zagreb (1607–1773), now Klovićevi Dvori Gallery and St. Catherine's Church; precursor to the Classical Gymnasium in Zagreb
  - The Neoacademia Zagrabiensis, created within the college (1662–1773), was the precursor to the University of Zagreb
- Jesuit church in Rijeka, now Rijeka Cathedral (1638–1773)
- Jesuit college in Varaždin (1636–1773), now the Faculty of Organization and Informatics and the Cathedral of the Assumption of the Virgin Mary
- Collegium Ragusinum in Dubrovnik (1658–1773), now Church of Saint Ignatius, Boscovich Gymnasium and Diocesan seminary
- Kutjevo Abbey in Slavonia (1698–1773)
- Jesuit college in Požega (1699–1773), from 1761 Academia Posegana, now Catholic High School
- Jesuit college in Karlovac (1736–1773)
- Jesuit college in Osijek (1766–1773)
- Basilica of the Heart of Jesus in Zagreb (since 1898)
- Jesuit Classical Gymnasium in Osijek (since 1998)

=== Czech Republic ===
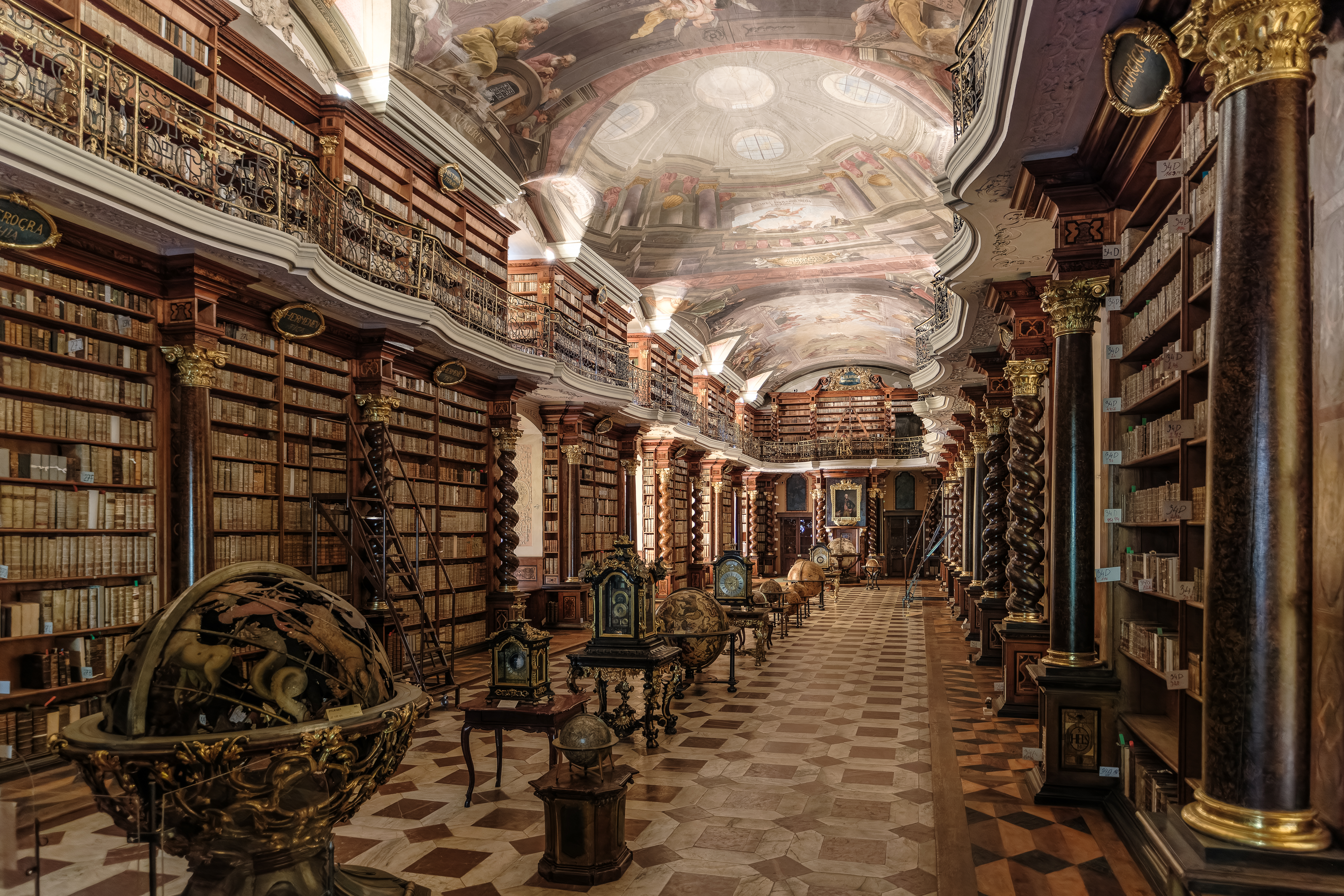
Clementinum library, Prague

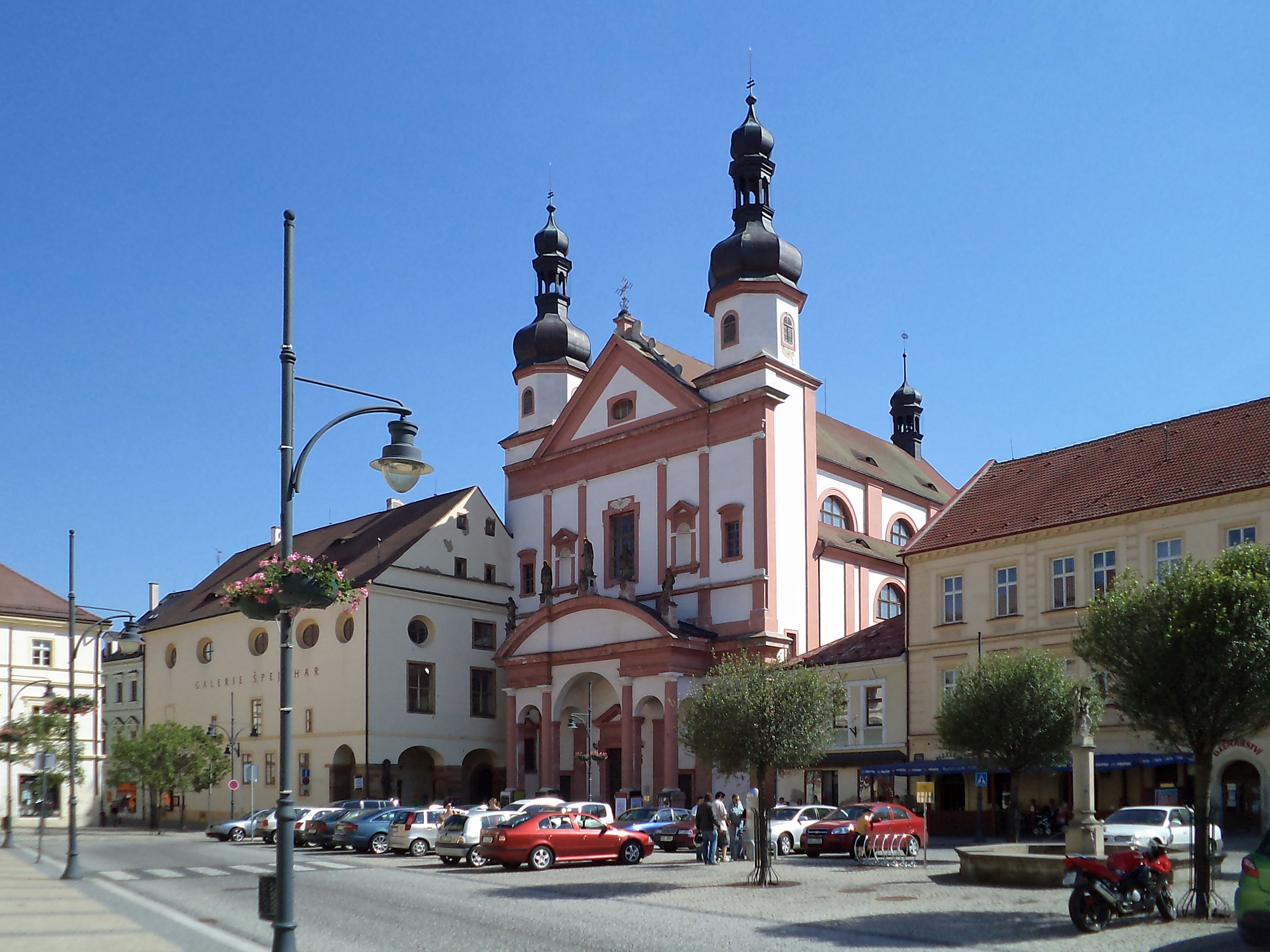
College in Chomutov

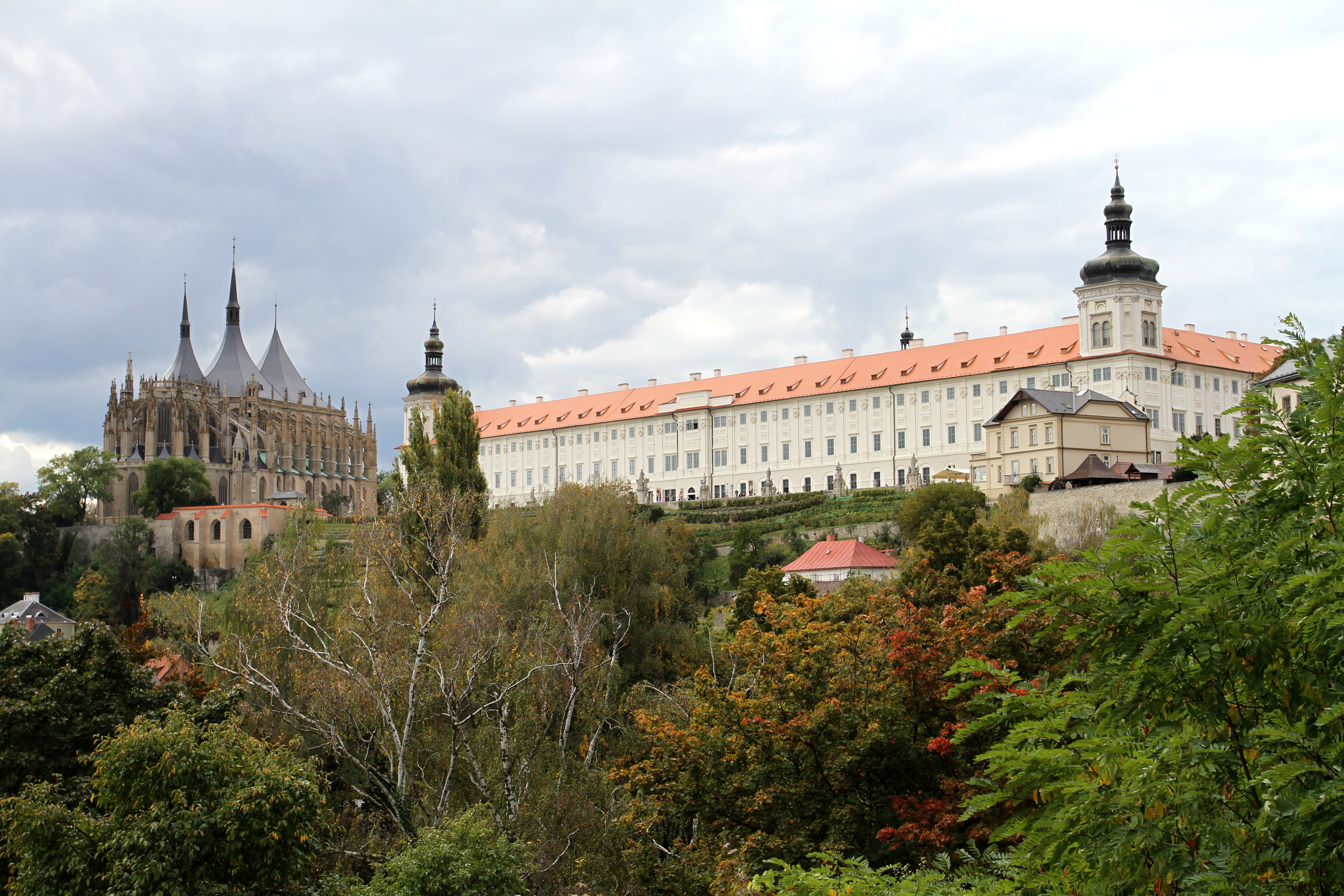
College in Kutná Hora

- Clementinum college in the Old Town of Prague (1556–1773), now National Library of the Czech Republic and St. Salvator Church
  - Jesuits also dominated Charles University from 1622, and in 1654 the Clementinum merged with the university's Karolinum to form Charles-Ferdinand University
- Jesuit college and university in Olomouc (1566–1773), now Palacký University Olomouc and Church of Our Lady of the Snows
- Jesuit college in Brno (1582–1773), now Church of the Assumption of the Virgin Mary
- Jesuit college in Český Krumlov (1588–1773), now Hotel Růže and Church of St. Vitus
- Jesuit College in Chomutov (1589–1773), now Regional Museum and Church of Saint Ignatius
- Jesuit college in Bohosudov near Krupka (1591–1773 and 1853–1950), now Episcopal grammar school and Basilica of Our Lady of Sorrows
- Jesuit college in Jindřichův Hradec (1594–1773), now the National Museum of Photography and Church of the Assumption of the Virgin Mary
- Church of St. Catherine in Chomutov (1605–1773), now part of the Regional Museum
- Nové Město Jesuit college in the New Town of Prague (1622–1773), now part of the General University Hospital and St. Ignatius Church built 1655–1677
- Bethlehem Chapel in Prague (1622–1773)
- Church of Our Lady before Týn in Prague (1623–1773)
- Jesuit college in Kutná Hora (1633–1773), now Central Bohemian Gallery (GASK) and Church of Saint Barbara
  - The Jesuits also established a school in Kutná Hora Castle in 1684, now the Czech Silver Museum
- Jesuit college in Klatovy (1634–1773), now Klatovy Municipal Library and Church of the Immaculate Conception of the Virgin Mary and St. Ignatius
- Jesuit college in Březnice (1642?–1773), now Church of St. Ignatius of Loyola and St. Francis Xavier
- Jesuit college in Uherské Hradiště (1662–1773), now a cultural center and the Church of Saint Francis Xavier
- Svatá Hora complex near Příbram (1647–1773), now Svatohorská monastery and Basilica of the Assumption of the Virgin Mary
- Jesuit college in Telč (1662–1773), now a part of Masaryk University, a branch of the Bohemian-Moravian Highlands Museum in Jihlava and the Church of the Name of Jesus
- Professed house in Prague (1673–1773), now Church of Saint Nicholas in Malá Strana
- Church of the Annunciation in Litoměřice (1701–1773)
- Jesuit college in Opařany (1717–1773), now known as Opařany Castle and Church of St. Francis Xavier
- Hostýn pilgrimage church and monastery in the Beskids (1887–1950)
- Velehrad Monastery in Velehrad (1890–1950 and since 1990), now also Stojanovo gymnázium and Basilica of Saints Cyril and Methodius

=== Denmark ===
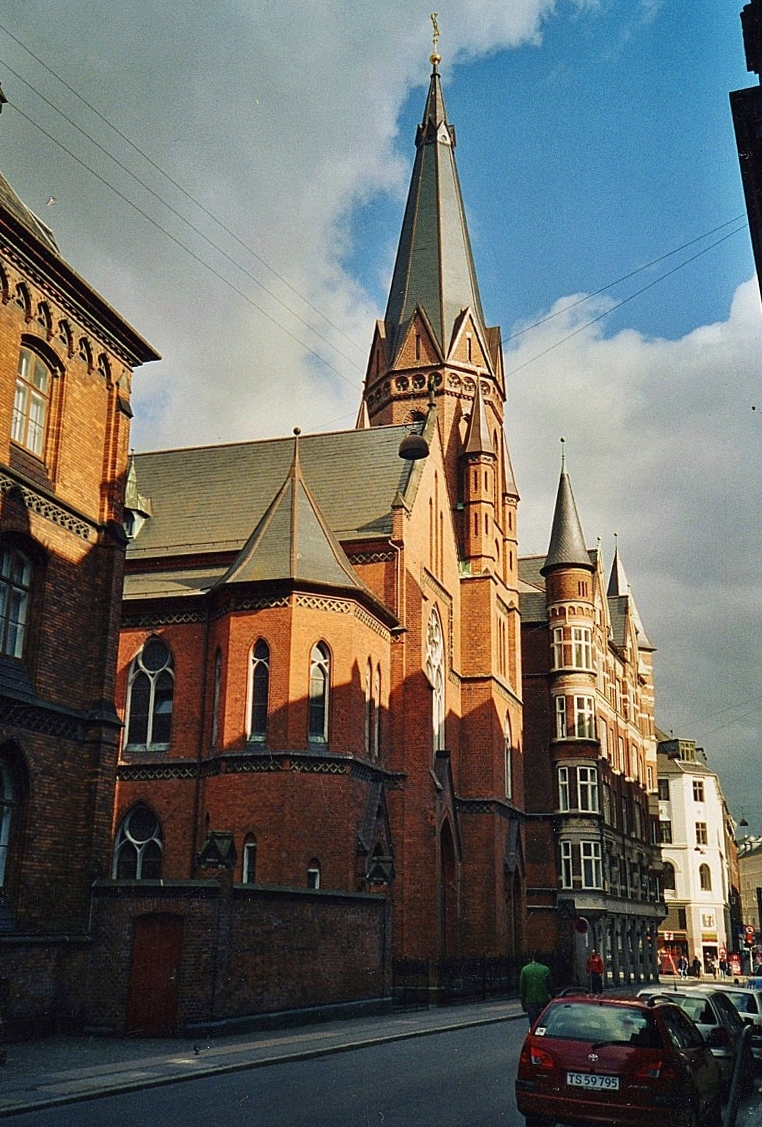
Jesus Heart's Church, Copenhagen

- Saint Andrew's School in Ordrup, Copenhagen (1871–1953), now St. Andrew's Church, Gentofte Municipality
- Catholic Church of Our Lady and Saint Canute School in Aarhus (since 1873)
- Saint Canute School in Copenhagen (1887–1973), now Mariendals Friskole
- Church of Jesus' Heart in Copenhagen (1895–2015)
- Niels Steensens Gymnasium in Copenhagen (since 1950)

=== Estonia ===
- Jesuit College in Tartu (1586–1625)

=== France ===
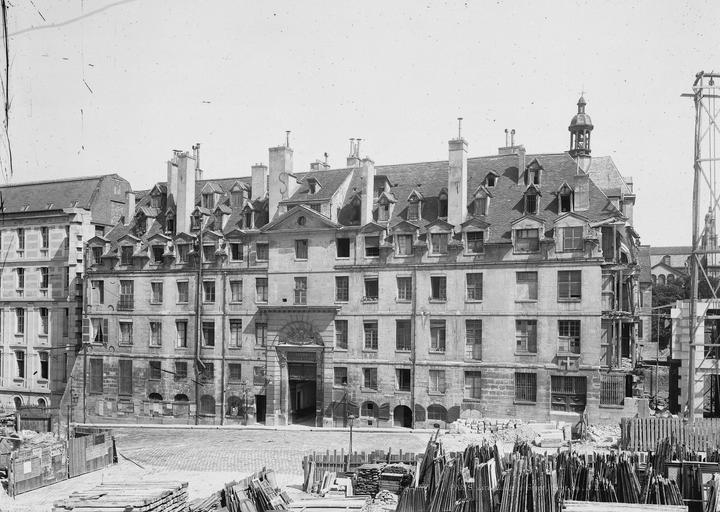
College of Clermont, Paris, before 19th-century destruction

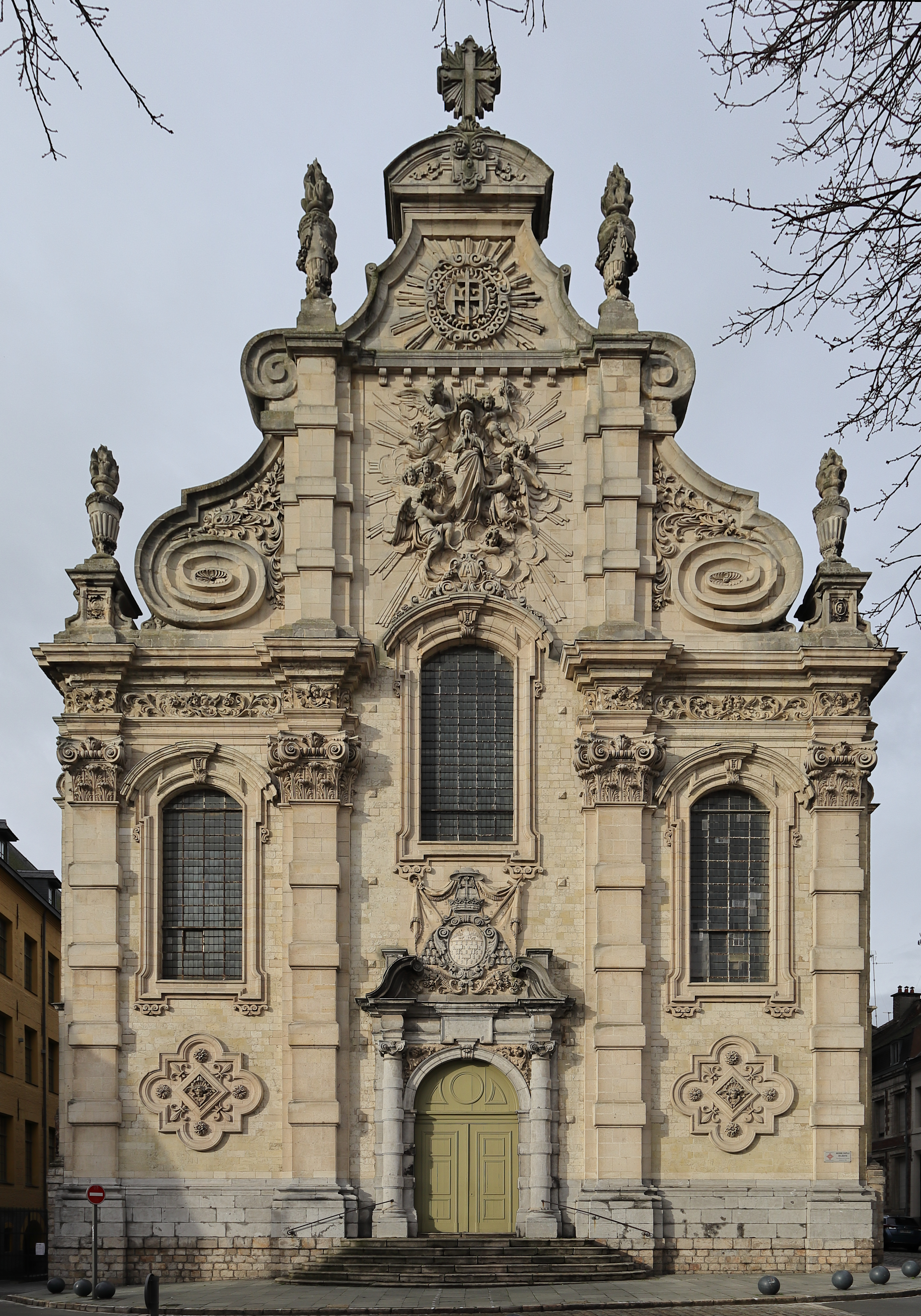
College church, Cambrai

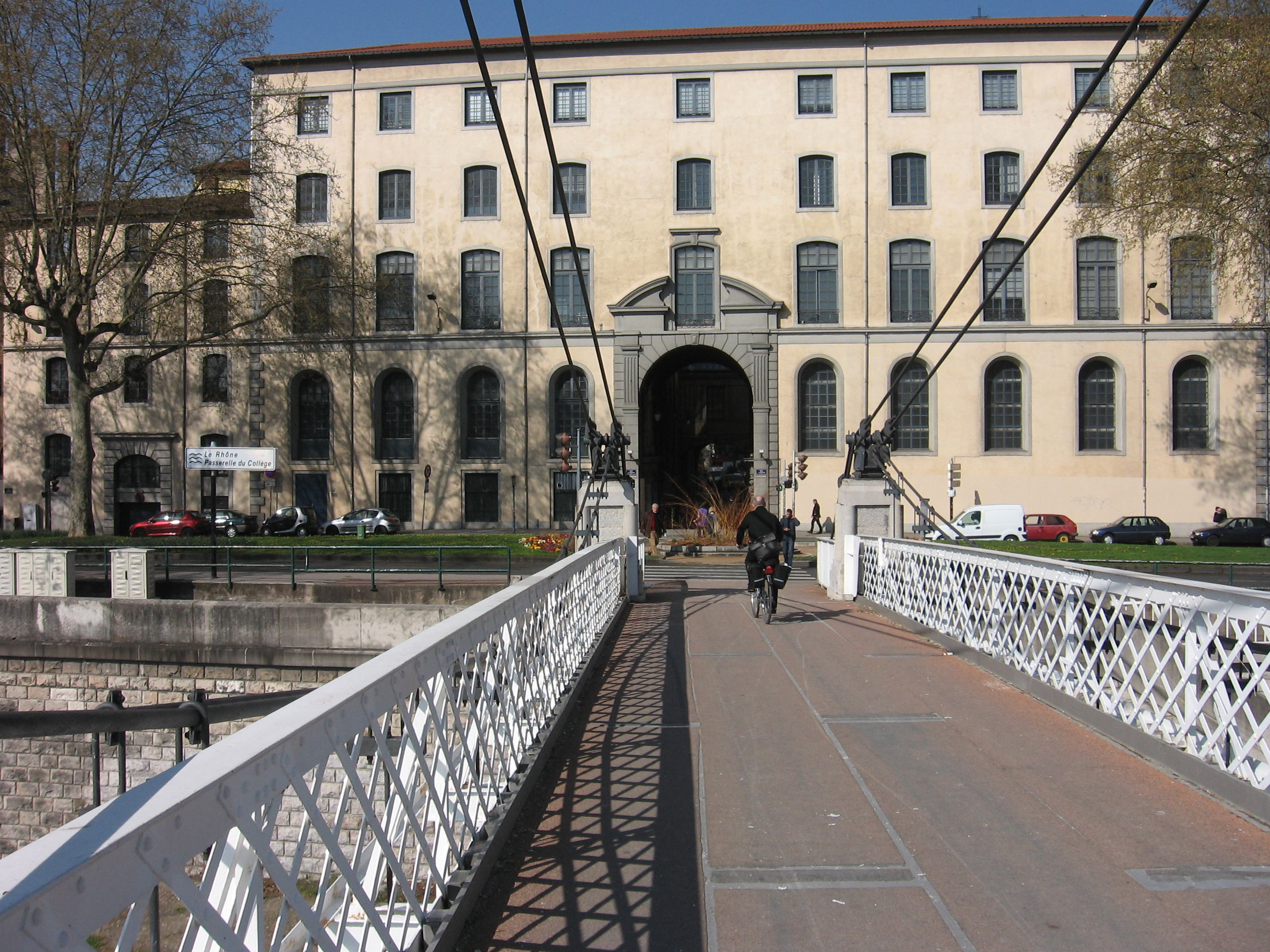
College in Lyon

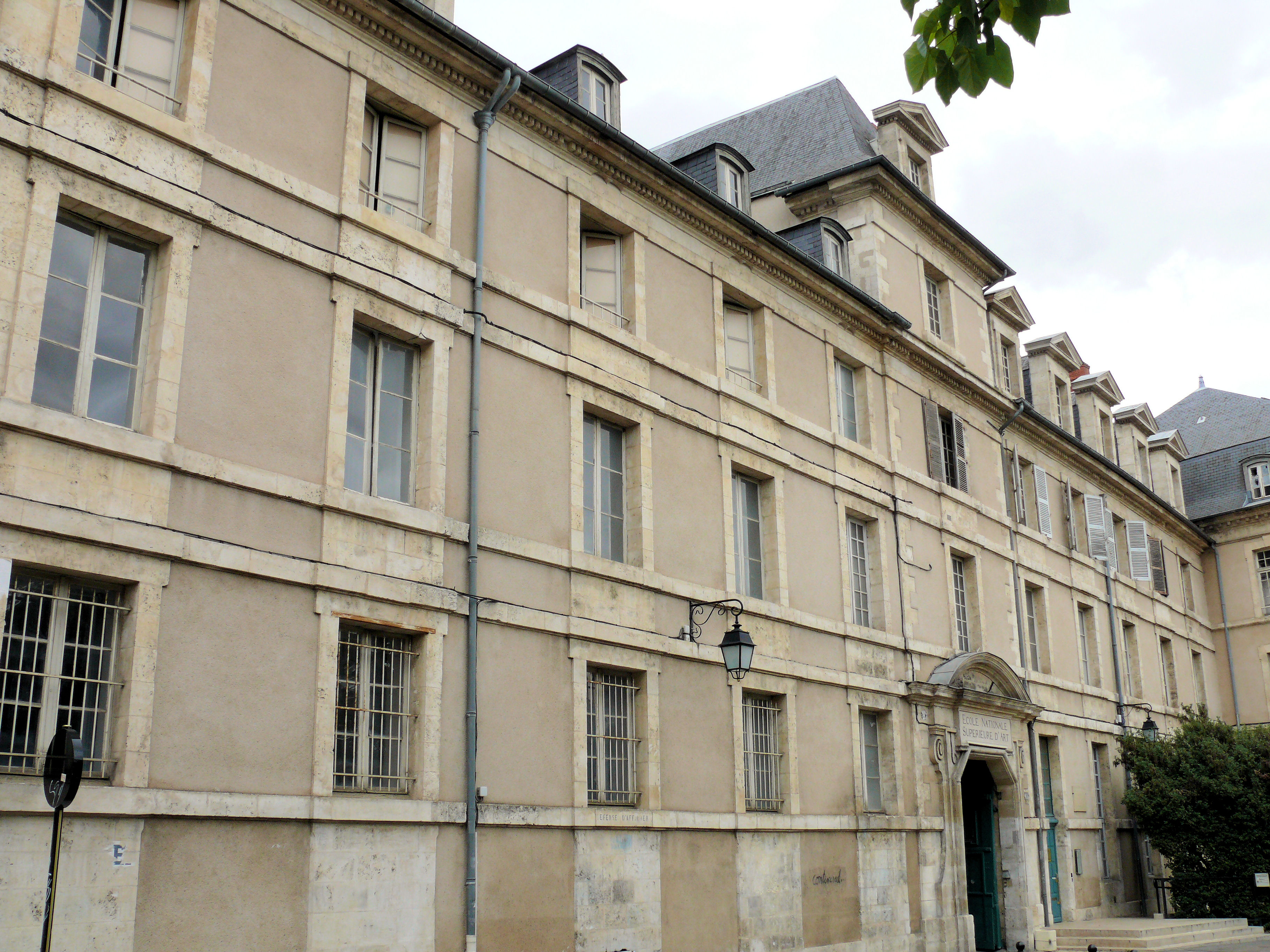
College in Bourges

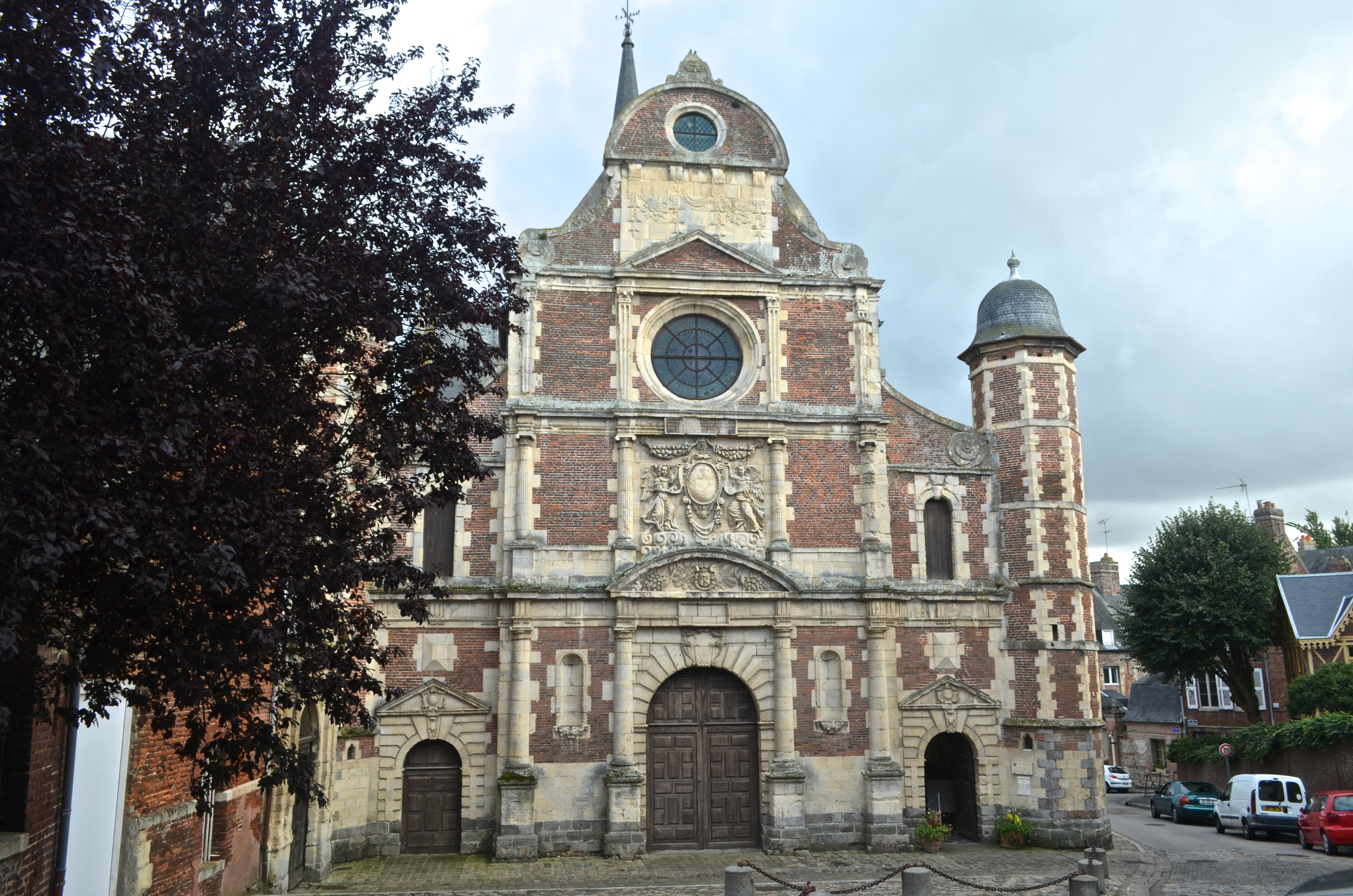
College church, Eu

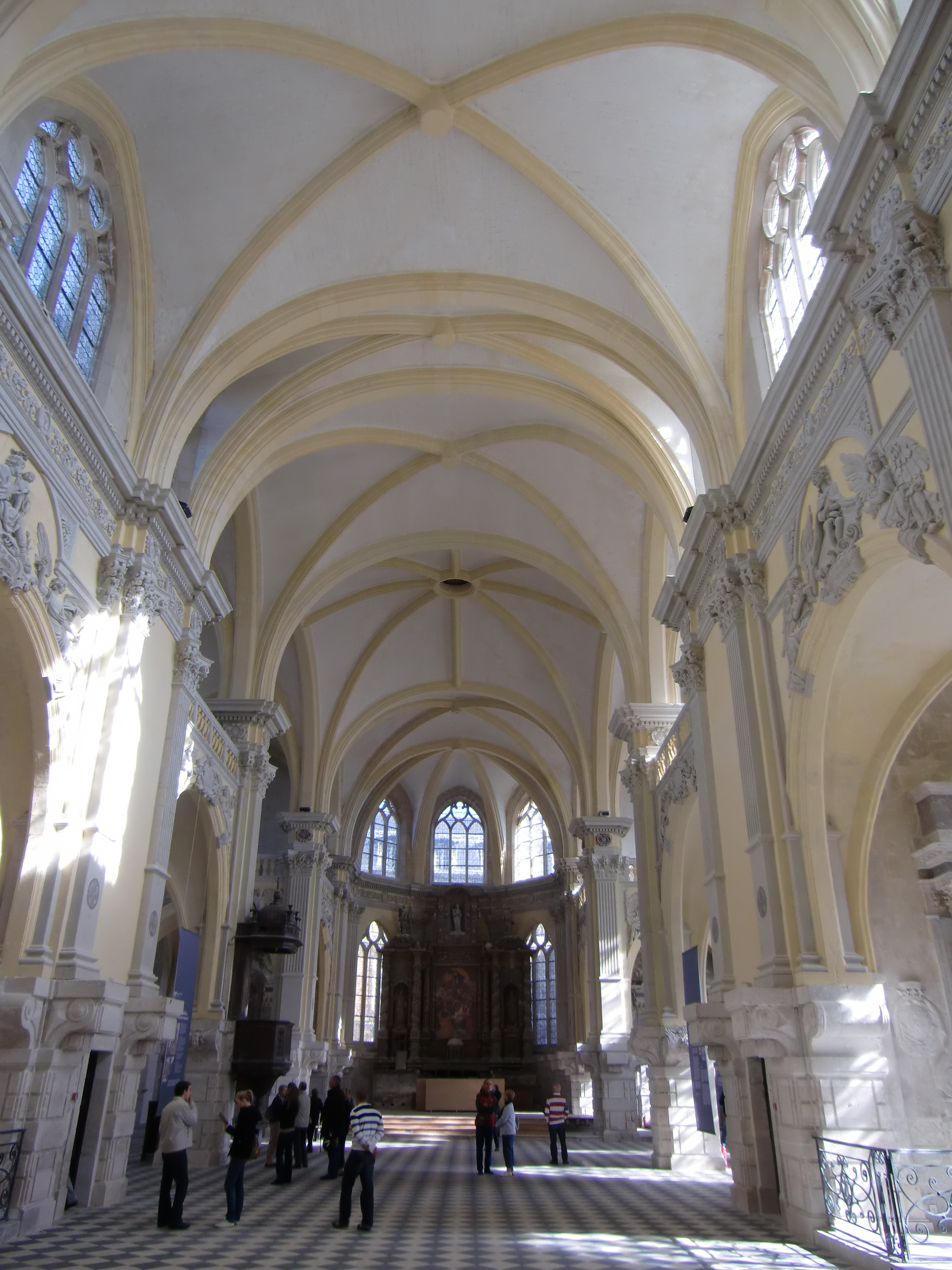
College church, Rouen

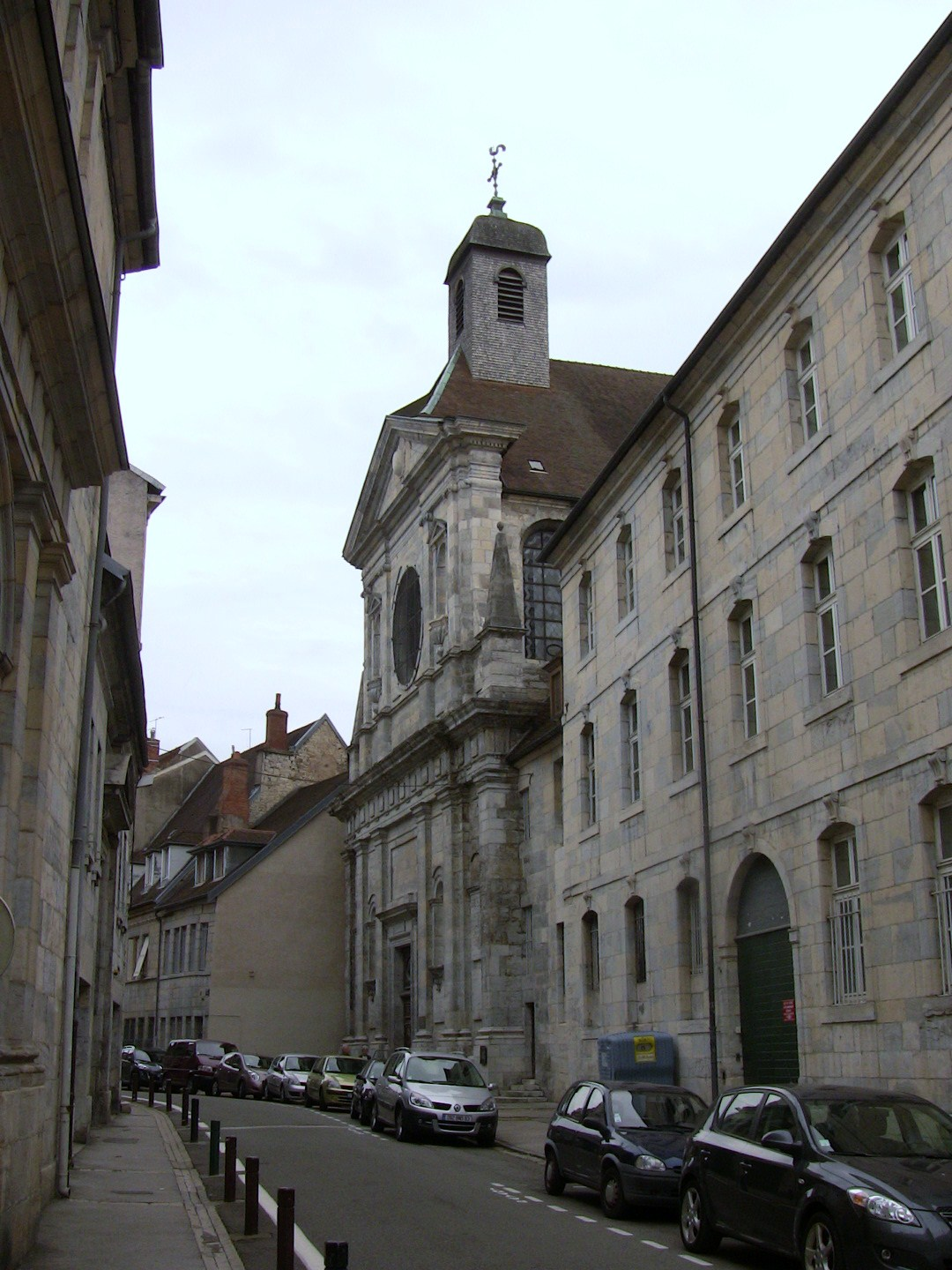
College in Besançon

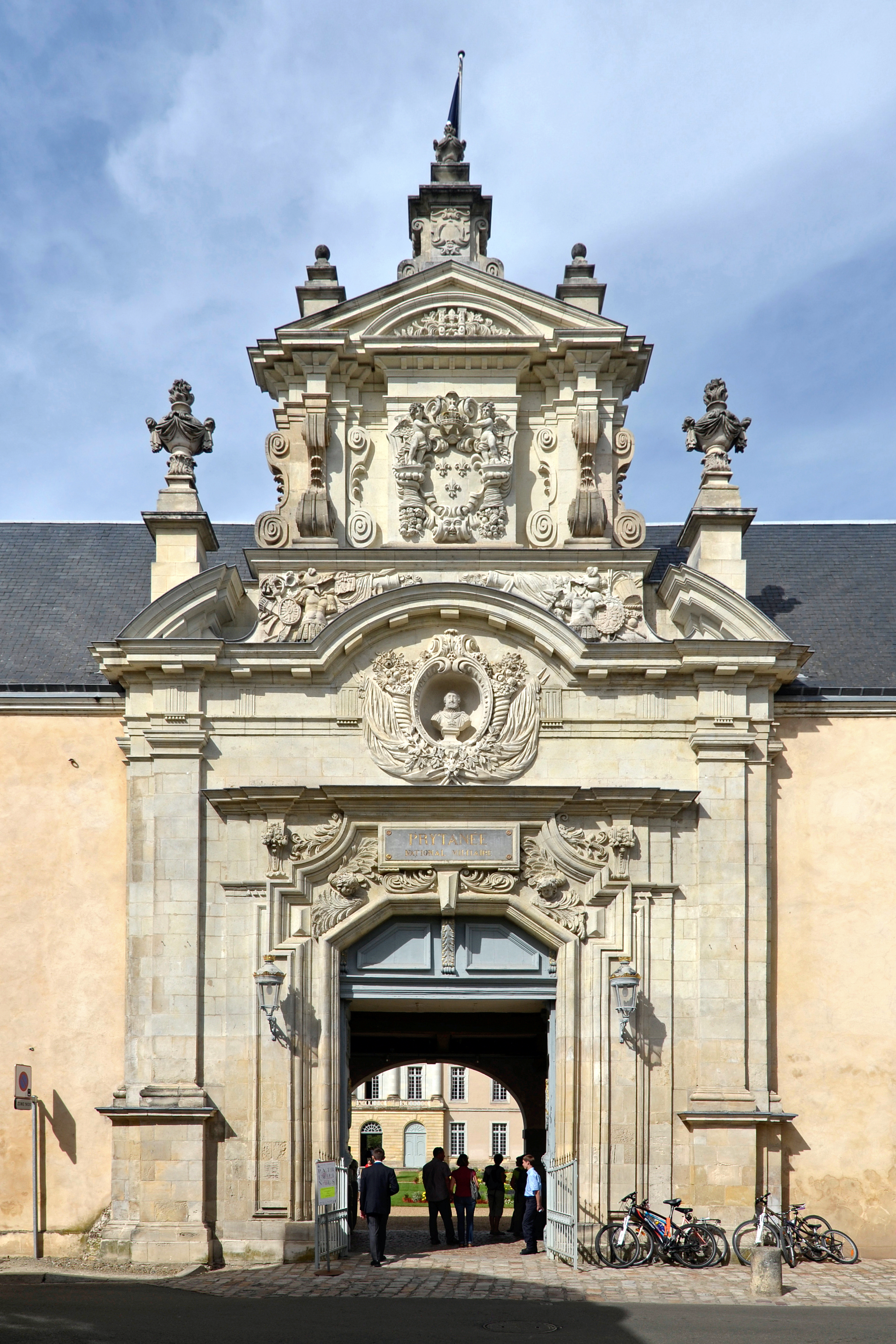
College portal, La Flèche

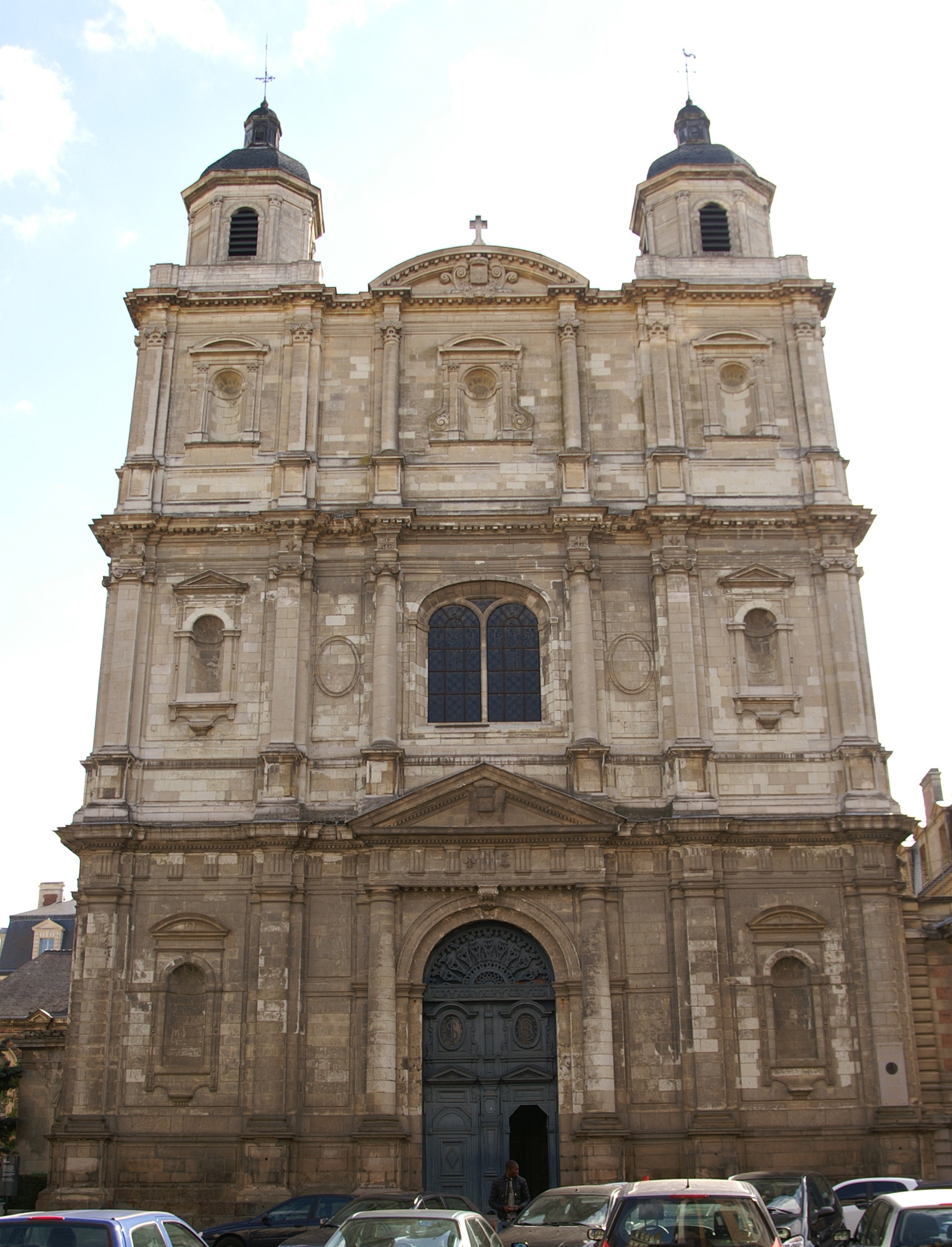
College church, Rennes

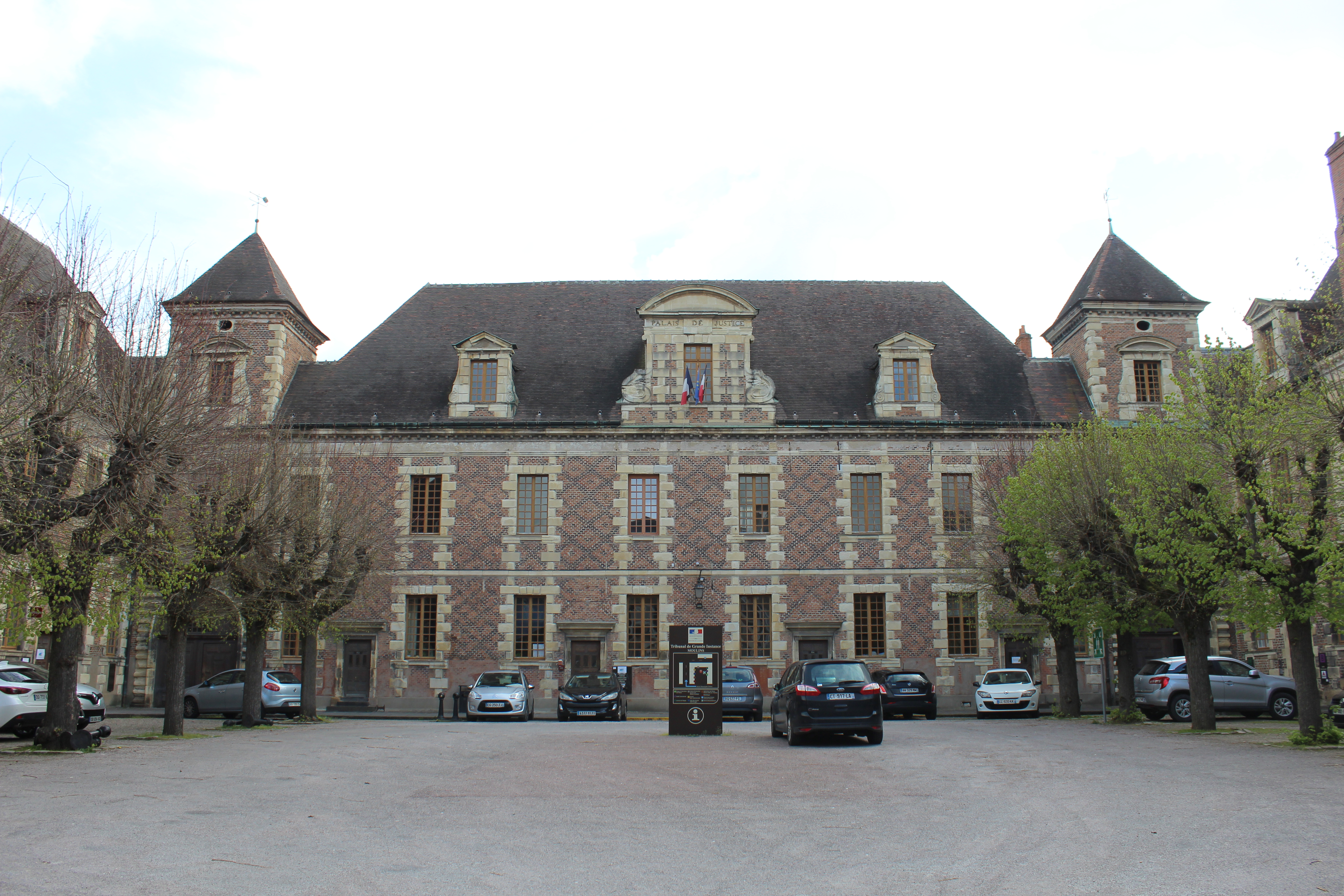
College in Moulins

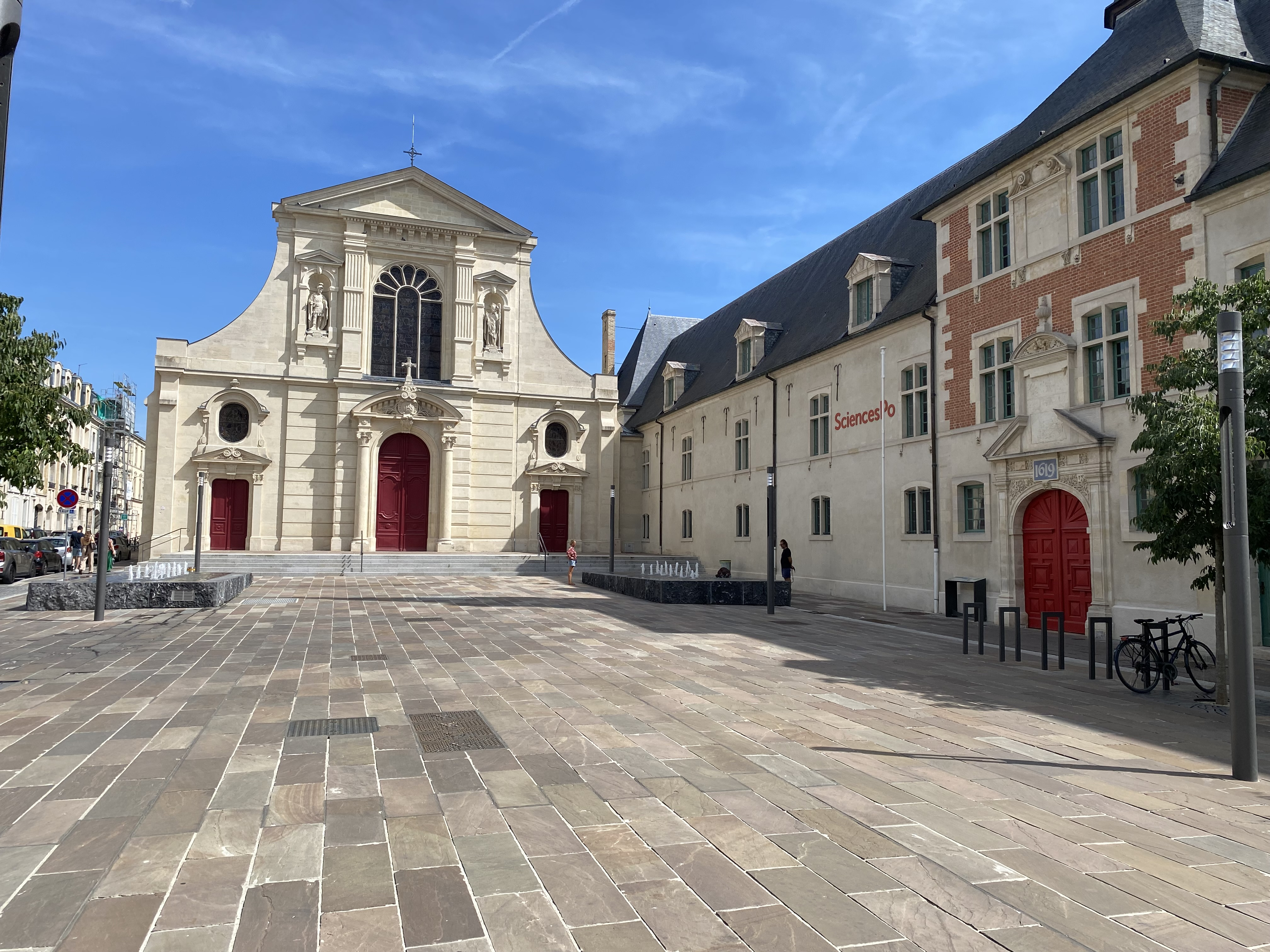
College in Reims

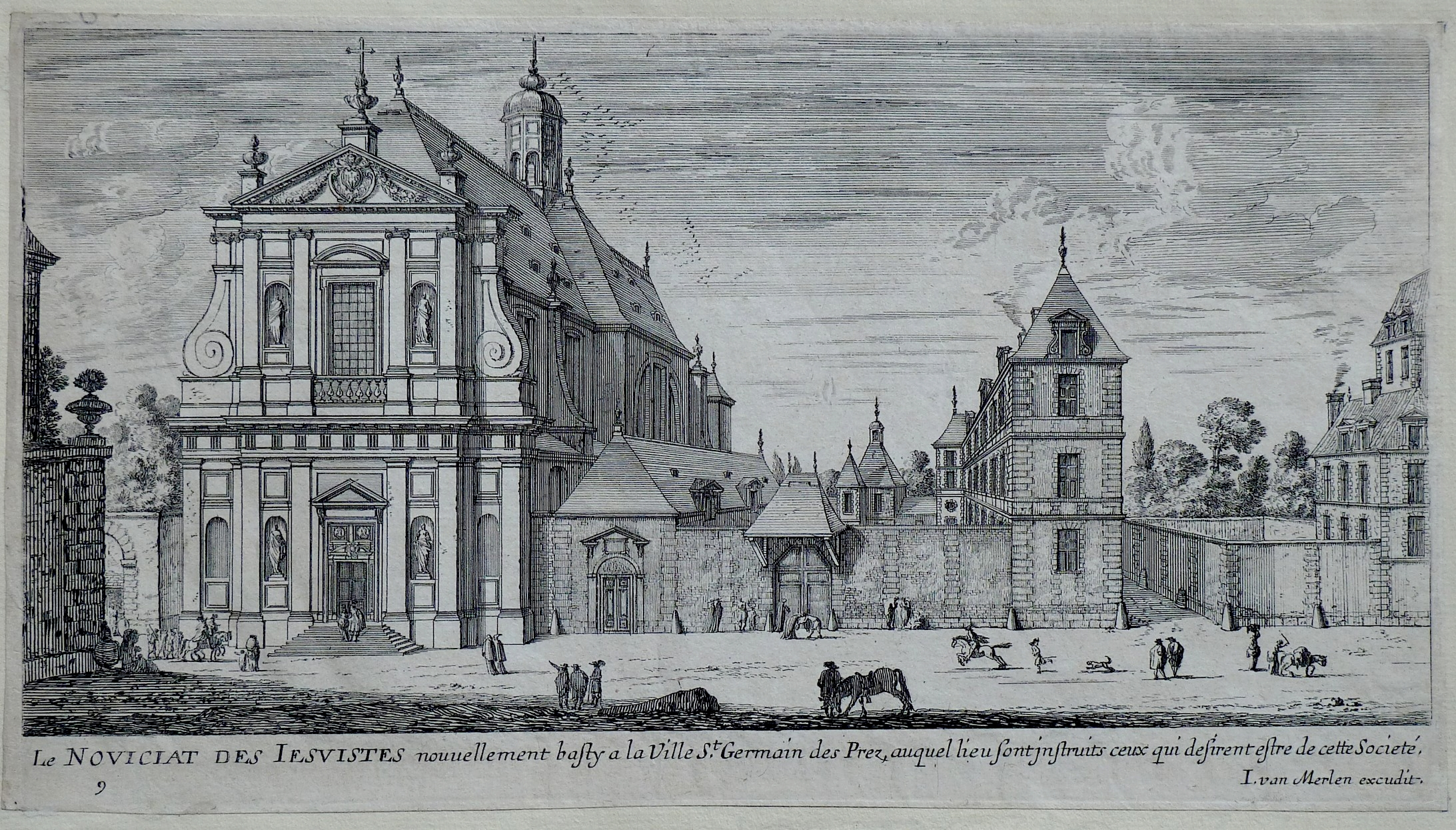
Novitiate in Paris

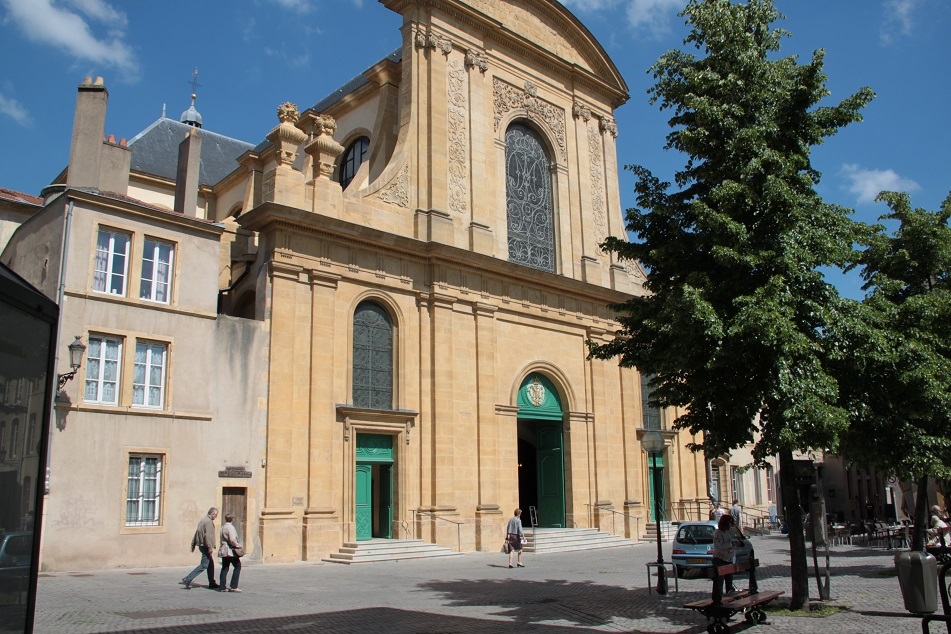
College church, Metz

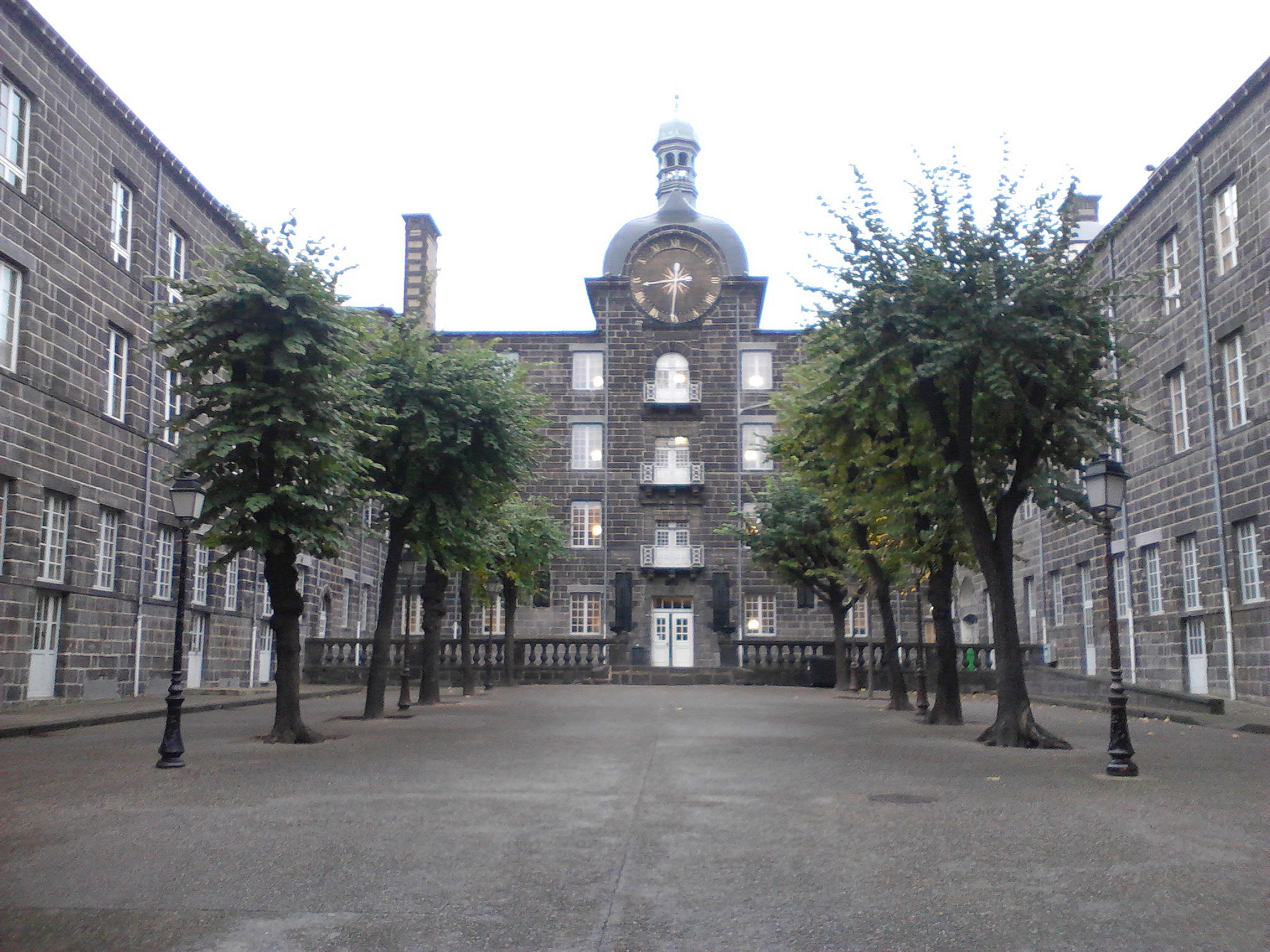
College in Clermont-Ferrand

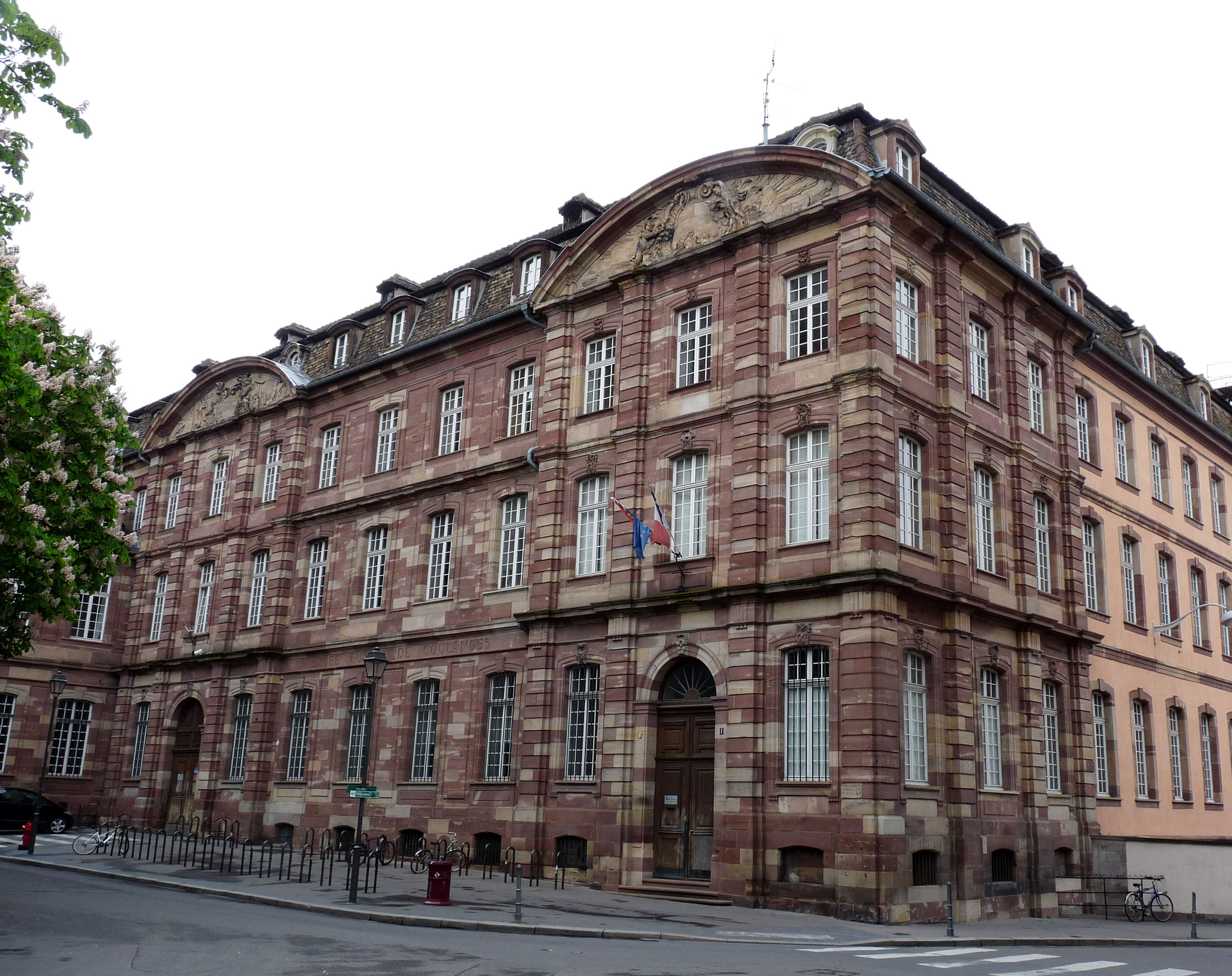
College in Strasbourg

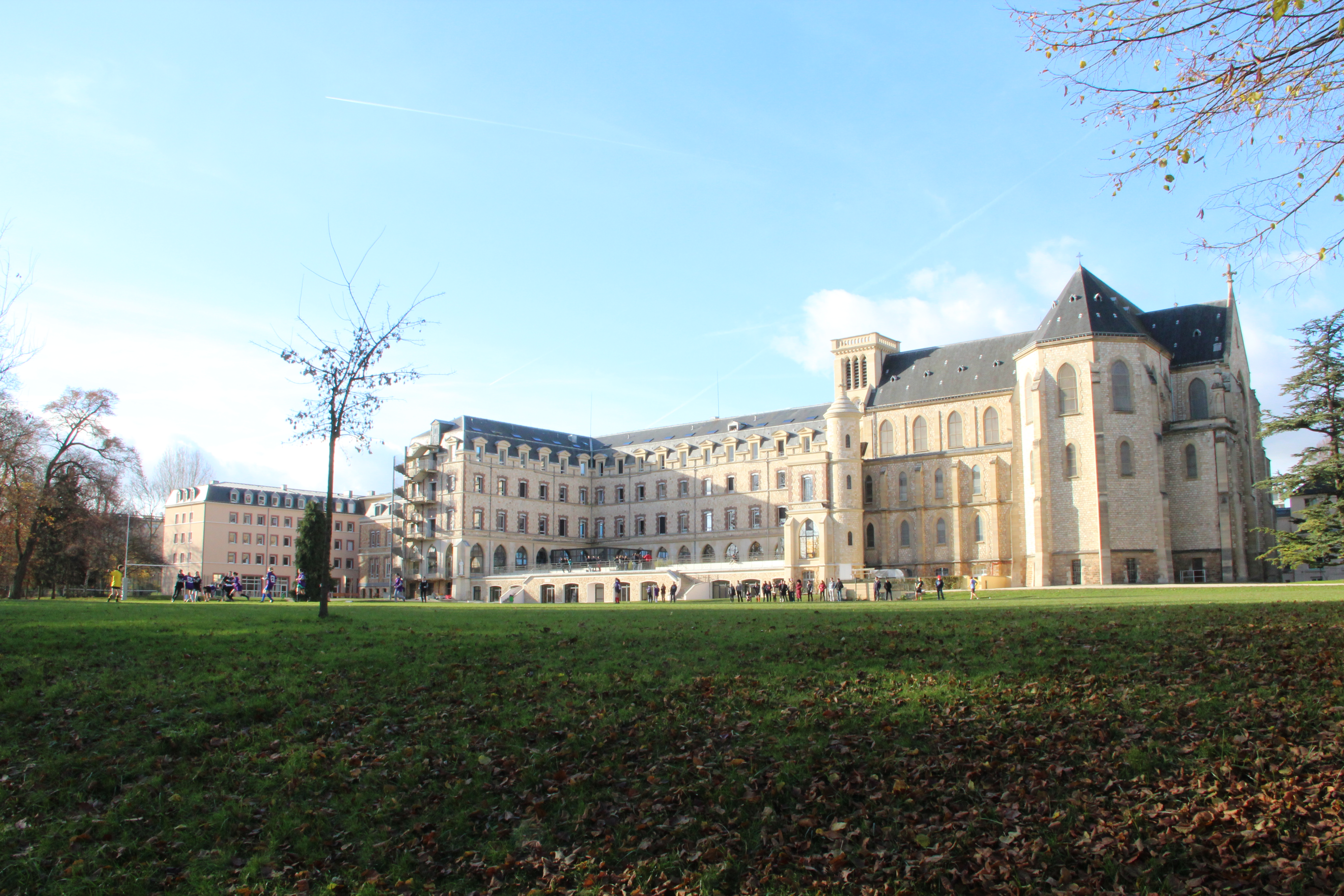
Lycée Sainte-Geneviève, Versailles

- Martyrium of Saint Denis beneath the Church of Saint-Pierre de Montmartre in Paris, the site of the original vow of the Society of Jesus on 15 August 1534
- Jesuit college in Billom (1558–1762, interrupted 1593–1604), now disaffected
- Jesuit college in Pamiers, County of Foix (1559–1562 and 1630–1762), now Collège Joseph-Paul Rambaud
- Jesuit college in Mauriac (1560–1762 with interruption 1595–1605), now Lycée Marmontel
- Jesuit college in Tournon-sur-Rhône (1561–1763), now Lycée Gabriel-Faure
- Jesuit college in Rodez (1562–1763), now chapel and offices of the Departmental Council of Aveyron; precursor to Lycée Ferdinand-Foch
- Jesuit college in Lille, Flanders (1562–1765), now offices of the Prefecture and Church of Saint Stephen
- Jesuit college in Toulouse (1562–1763), now Lycée Pierre-de-Fermat
- Jesuit college in Cambrai in the eponymous Bishopric (1563–1765), now Le Labo cultural center and Jesuit Chapel
- Collège de Clermont in Paris (1564–1762, interrupted 1595–1618), renamed Louis-Le-Grand in 1682, now Lycée Louis-le-Grand
- Jesuit college in Verdun (1564–1763), now Collège Buvignier and its chapel
- Jesuit college in Avignon, Comtat Venaissin (1565–1763), now Ecole primaire Frédéric-Mistral and Lapidary Museum in the former chapel; precursor to Lycée Saint-Joseph of Avignon
- Collège of the Trinity in Lyon (1565–1762, interrupted 1595–1604), now Collège-lycée Ampère and Trinity Chapel
- Jesuit college in Chambéry, Savoy (1565–1773), now Church of Notre-Dame
- Collège d'Anchin in Douai, Flanders (1568–1763), now Lycée Albert-Châtelet
- Jesuit college in Saint-Omer, Artois (1568–1762), now Lycée Alexandre Ribot and Chapel of the Jesuits
- Université de Pont-à-Mousson in Pont-à-Mousson, Lorraine (1572–1768), now Lycée Jacques Marquette
- Jesuit college in Nevers (1572–1762, interrupted 1594–1607), now Church of Saint Peter
- Jesuit college in Bourges (1573–1595 and 1605–1764), now École nationale supérieure d'art de Bourges
- Professed House in Paris (1580–1763, interrupted 1595–1606), now Lycée Charlemagne and Church of Saint-Paul-Saint-Louis
- Jesuit college and university in Molsheim, Alsace (1580–1765), now Jesuit Church
- Jesuit college in Eu (1581–1763, with interruption 1594–1607), with surviving college chapel
- Jesuit college in Dijon (1581–1763), now Bibliothèque patrimoniale et d'étude including the former college chapel
- Jesuit college in Dole, Franche-Comté (1582–1763), now Collège de l'Arc and Chapel of the Jesuits
- Jesuit college in Embrun (1582–1763, interrupted 1585–1604), now a residential building
- Jesuit college in Valenciennes, Hainaut (1585–1763), now Municipal Library and Auditorium Saint-Nicolas in the former college chapel
- Jesuit college in Le Puy-en-Velay (1588–1763), now Collège Lafayette and Église du Collège
- Jesuit novitiate in Avignon, Comtat Venaissin (1589–1762), now a hotel (Cloître Saint-Louis), Institut supérieur des techniques du spectacle d'Avignon and the Chapel of Saint Louis
- Jesuit college in Auch (1590–1762), now Collège Salinis
- Jesuit college in Agen (1591–1763)
- Jesuit college in Périgueux (1591–1762), now Espace culturel François-Mitterrand; precursor to Cité scolaire Bertran-de-Born
- Jesuit college in Rouen (1593–1762, interrupted 1595–1604), now Lycée Pierre-Corneille and Church of Saint Louis
- Jesuit college in Nîmes (1596–1762), now Muséum d'histoire naturelle de Nîmes
- Jesuit college in Besançon, Franche-Comté (1597–1763), now Collège Victor-Hugo and Church of Saint Francis Xavier
- Jesuit college in Limoges (1597–1763), now Lycée Gay-Lussac including the former college chapel
- Royal college in Béziers (1599–1763), now Lycée Henri-IV
- Jesuit college in Bergues, Flanders (1600–1763), now Collège Saint-Winoc
- Jesuit novitiate in Nancy, Lorraine (1602–1763)
- Jesuit college in Arras, Artois (1603–1762), now Hotel de l'Univers
- Jesuit college in Aubenas (1603–1762)
- Irish College, Douai, Flanders (1603–1763)
- St. George's Church in Haguenau, Alsace (1604–1763)
- Jesuit college in Cahors (1604–1762), now Collège Gambetta
- Royal College of Henry IV in La Flèche (1604–1762), now Prytanée national militaire and Church of Saint Louis
- Jesuit college in Rennes (1604–1762), now Lycée Émile-Zola de Rennes and Church of All Saints
- Royal college in Vienne (1604–1764), now Collège Ponsard
- Jesuit college in Moulins (1605–1762), now Palais de justice de Moulins
- Jesuit college of Saint Nicholas in Amiens (1606–1762), no longer extant
- Jesuit college in Reims (1606–1762), now Reims campus of Sciences Po and Church of Saint Maurice
- Jesuit college in Carpentras (1607–1762), now Maison du Citoyen and former chapel
- Jesuit novitiate in Bordeaux (1607–1762), now Church of Saint Paul and Saint Francis Xavier
- Royal college in Poitiers (1607–1762), now Collège Henri-IV, Les Beaux-Arts/École d'arts plastiques, École européenne supérieure de l'image and Chapel of Saint Louis
- Jesuit college in Caen (1608–1763), formerly Collège du Mont, destroyed in World War II; the non-adjacent Church of Notre-Dame-de-la-Gloriette is still extant
- Jesuit novitiate in Paris (1610–1763), demolished in the early 19th century
- Jesuit college in Vesoul, Franche-Comté (1610–1762), now former Collège Gérôme
- Jesuit college in Angoulême (1611–1762), now Conservatoire du GrandAngoulême Gabriel Fauré
- Jesuit college in Saintes (1611–1762), now City Hall
- Jesuit college in Roanne (1611–1762), now Lycée Jean-Puy and Chapel of Saint Michael
- Jesuit college in Aire-sur-la-Lys, Flanders (1612–1763), now Collège Sainte-Marie and Church of Saint James and Saint Ignatius
- Scots College in Douai, Flanders (1612–1763)
- Jesuit college in Charleville, Principality of Arches (1612–1762), with remaining Chapelle des Jésuites
- Jesuit college in Hesdin, Artois (1613–1762), now a hospital
- Jesuit novitiate on Place de la Daurade in Toulouse (1613–1762), now Ecole primaire Lakanal
- Jesuit college in Ensisheim, Alsace (1614–1762), now prison Maison centrale d'Ensisheim
- Jesuit college in Sélestat, Alsace (1615–1767), now Ecole Sainte-Foy and St. Faith's Church
- Jesuit college in Pontoise (1614–1763), later demolished
- Jesuit residence in Marseille (1616–1763), from 1727 Collège Saint-Jaume, later demolished
- Basilique Notre-Dame de Marienthal near Haguenau, Alsace (1616–1764)
- Collège Gilles de Trèves in Bar-le-Duc, Lorraine (1617–1762)
- Royal college in Orléans (1617–1762), now the Orléans campus of Institut supérieur du commerce de Paris; precursor to Lycée Pothier
- Jesuit college in Bailleul, Flanders (1617–1762), with some remains integrated into the town's World War I monument
- Jesuit college in Autun (1618–1763), now Lycée Bonaparte and Church of Our Lady of the Assumption
- Jesuit college in Cassel, Flanders (1618–1762), now Jesuits' Chapel
- Jesuit college in Chaumont (1618–1763), now Collège Camille Saint-Saëns and Jesuit's Chapel
- Jesuit college in Aurillac (1619–1764), now Collège Jeanne de la Treilhe
- Jesuit college in Maubeuge, Hainaut (1619–1765), now Salle Sthrau (former chapel), Pôle culturel Henri Lafitte, and Collège Ernest Coutelle
- Jesuit college in Quimper (1620–1763), now Collège la Tour d'Auvergne and Chapel of the jesuits
- Royal college in Alençon (1620–1763), now Musée des Beaux-arts et de la Dentelle and municipal library in the former chapel
- Jesuit college in Aix-en-Provence (1621–1763), now Lycée du Sacré-Coeur
- Jesuit college in Béthune, Artois (1621–1762), now Lycée Louis Blaringhem
- Jesuit college in Langres (1621–1763), now Collège Diderot
- Jesuit college in Auxerre (1622–1763), now Lycée Jacques-Amyot
- Jesuit college in Gray (1622–1763), now Lycée Augustin-Cournot
- Jesuit college in Blois (1622–1764), now Banque Régionale de l'Ouest and Church of Saint Vincent de Paul; precursor to Cité scolaire Augustin-Thierry
- Royal college in Grenoble (1622–1763), now Lycée Stendhal
- Jesuit college of Saint Louis in Metz (1622–1763)
- Jesuit college in Pau (1622–1763), now Lycée Louis-Barthou and Church of Saint Aloysius
- Jesuit college in Albi (1623–1763), now Lycée Lapérouse with the former chapel converted into the Lycée's library
- Jesuit college in Bourg-en-Bresse (1623–1762), now Lycée Lalande
- Jesuit college in Carcassonne (1623–1763), now Maison des Associations and auditorium in the former chapel
- Jesuit college in Sens (1623–1762), now Collège Stéphane-Mallarmé
- Jesuit college in Armentières, Flanders (1623–1767), demolished in 1798
- Jesuit college in Montpellier (1626–1762), now Musée Fabre and Church of Notre-Dame des Tables; precursor to Lycée Joffre
- Oelenberg Abbey in Reiningue, Alsace (1626–1773), now a Trappist monastery
- Estate and retreat near Paris (1626–1763), known as Mont-Louis after 1652, now Père Lachaise Cemetery
- Jesuit college in La Roche-sur-Foron, Savoy (1628–1712), now médiathèque
- Royal college in La Rochelle (1629–1762), now Collège Eugène Fromentin and Chapelle Fromentin converted into an arts venue
- Jesuit college of Saint Yves in Vannes (1630–1762), now Collège Jules-Simon and Chapel of Saint Yves
- Jesuit college in Bouquenom, later Sarre-Union, Lorraine (1630–1762), now Chapel of Saint Louis
- Jesuit college in Dunkirk, Flanders (1631–1762), destroyed in stages between 1810 and 1940
- Jesuit college in Épinal, Lorraine (1633–1763), destroyed in September 1944; the chapel had been demolished in the late 19th century
- Jesuit college in Chalon-sur-Saône (1634–1763), now Lycée Emiland Gauthey (chapel demolished in 1890)
- Jesuit college in Clermont-Ferrand (1634–1762), now Conservatoire Emmanuel-Chabrier
- Royal college in Montauban (1634–1762), now a cultural center, office du tourisme and Church of Saint Joseph
- Jesuit college in Bastia, Corsica (1635–1769), now Collège Simon-Vinciguerra and Church of Saint Charles Borromeo
- Jesuit college in Tours (1635–1762), destroyed in 1944
- Jesuit college in Fontenay-le-Comte (1637–1763), now École Intercommunale de Musique et de Danse
- Retreat of the Collège de Clermont in Gentilly, Val-de-Marne (1638–1762)
- Jesuit college in Arles (1639–1763), now Museon Arlaten
- Jesuit college in Saint-Flour (1643–1763)
- Royal college in Compiègne (1653–1762)
- Royal college in Sedan (1663–1763), now part of Collège Turenne
- Jesuit college in Paray-le-Monial (1633–1762), now Lycée Jeanne-d'Arc and Chapelle Saint-Claude-la-Colombière rebuilt in the 20th century
- Church of Our Lady of Assumption in Metz (1642–1762)
- Jesuit college in Castres (1664–1762), now Collège Jean-Jaurès
- Royal college in Perpignan (1667–1763); precursor to Lycée François-Arago
- Jesuit college in Strasbourg (1685–1762), now Lycée Fustel-de-Coulanges
- Jesuit college in Die (1696–1763), now Calvinist church (temple protestant) in the former chapel
- Jesuit college in Colmar (1714–1763), now Lycée Bartholdi including the Chapel of Saint Peter
- Jesuit college in Le Cateau-Cambrésis (1716–1763), now Lycée Camille-Desmoulins
- Jesuit college in Hagenau (1730–1762), now a retirement house, on the site of the former Imperial Palace
- Jesuit college in Saint-Nicolas-de-Port, Lorraine (1753–1768), now demolished
- Abbey of Saint-Acheul in Amiens (1816–1830)
- Collegiate Church of Saint Michael in Laval (1816–1968)
- Saint-Ignace school in Paris (1826–1839), later Conservatoire de Paris
- Church of the Mission de France in Marseille (1839–1901)
- Faculty of theology Lyon-Fourvière near the Basilica of Notre-Dame de Fourvière, predecessor of Facultés Loyola Paris (1841–1901 and 1926–1974), now Musée de Fourvière
- Sanctuary of Our Lady of Mont-Roland in Jouhe (1843–1961)
- Notre Dame de Mongré High School in Villefranche-sur-Saône (since 1848)
- Lycée la Providence in Amiens (since 1850)
- Lycée Saint-Joseph-de-Tivoli in Bordeaux (since 1850)
- Lycée Saint-Joseph in Avignon (since 1850)
- Collège Saint-Joseph in Sarlat (1850–1967)
- Lycée Saint-François-Xavier in Vannes (since 1850)
- Sainte Marie La Grand'Grange in Saint-Chamond, Loire (since after 1850)
- Chapel of the Jesuits in Metz (1851–1861)
- College of the Immaculate Conception in Paris (1852–1901)
- Lycée privé Sainte-Geneviève in Versailles (since 1854)
- Church of Saint Ignatius in Paris (since 1855)
  - Centre Sèvres (since 1974)
- Lycée Saint-Marc in Lyon (since 1871)
- Provence School in Marseille (since 1873)
- Caousou School in Toulouse (since 1874)
- Saint-Joseph School in Reims (1874–1901 with interruptions after 1880)
- Collège Saint-Joseph de Lille in Lille (1876–1968)
- Institution Notre-Dame Saint-François (Évreux) in Évreux (1882–1963)
- Lycée Saint-Louis-de-Gonzague in Paris (since 1894)
- Institut catholique d'arts et métiers in Lille (since 1898), Nantes (since 1990), Toulouse (since 1993), La Roche-sur-Yon (since 1994), Vannes (since 2001), and Sénart (since 2012)
- Le Marais Sainte-Thérèse Professional School in Saint-Étienne (since 1913)
- Multi-disciplinary training center at the former Rothschild mansion of Les Fontaines near Chantilly (1946–1998), now a conference center of Capgemini
- Catholic Office of Information and Initiative for Europe in Strasbourg (since 1956)
- Ricci Institute in Paris (since 1972)
- Jesuit archive in Vanves (since 1989)
- Fénelon - La Trinité School in Lyon (since 2003)

=== Germany ===
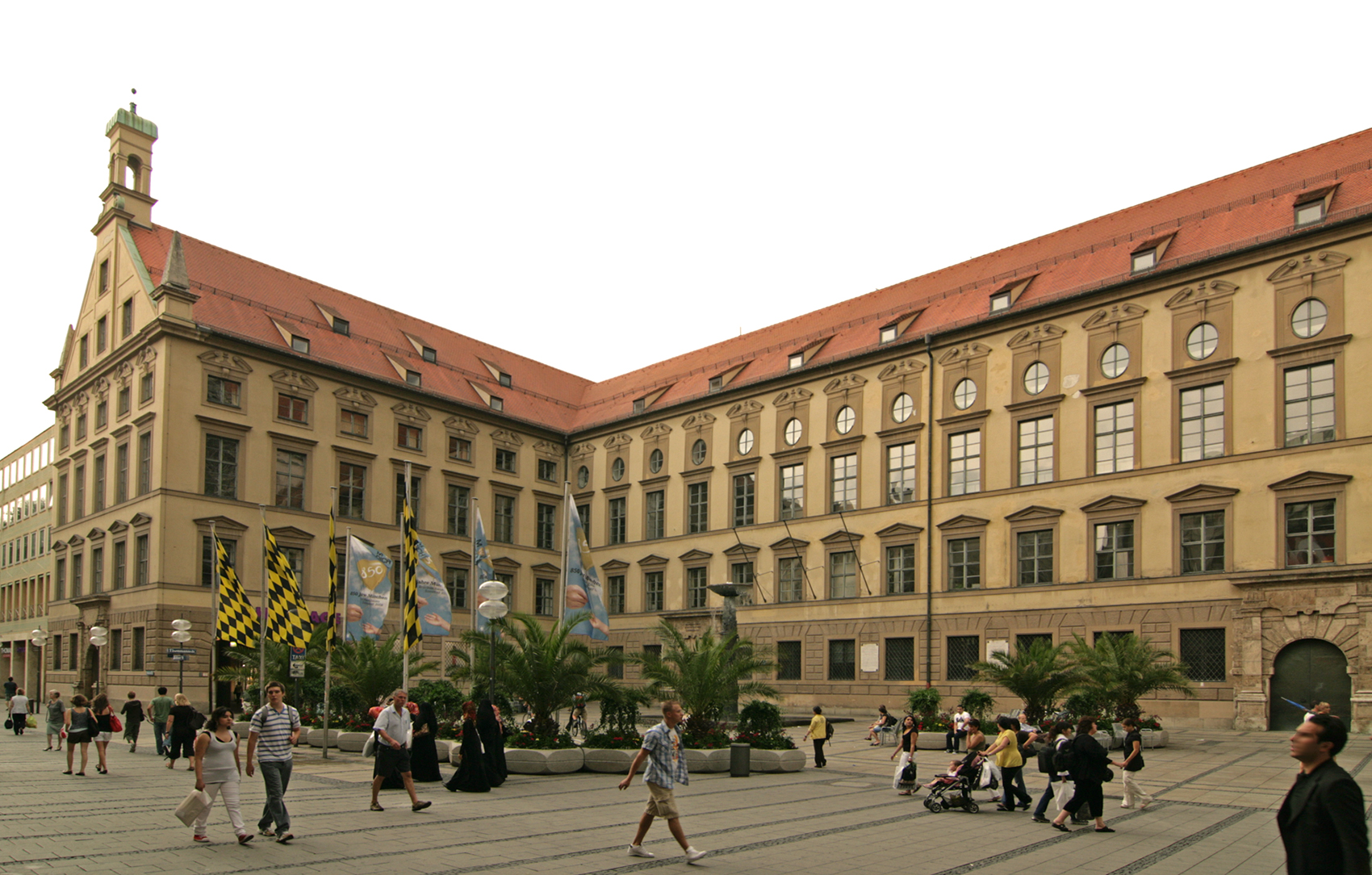
College in Munich

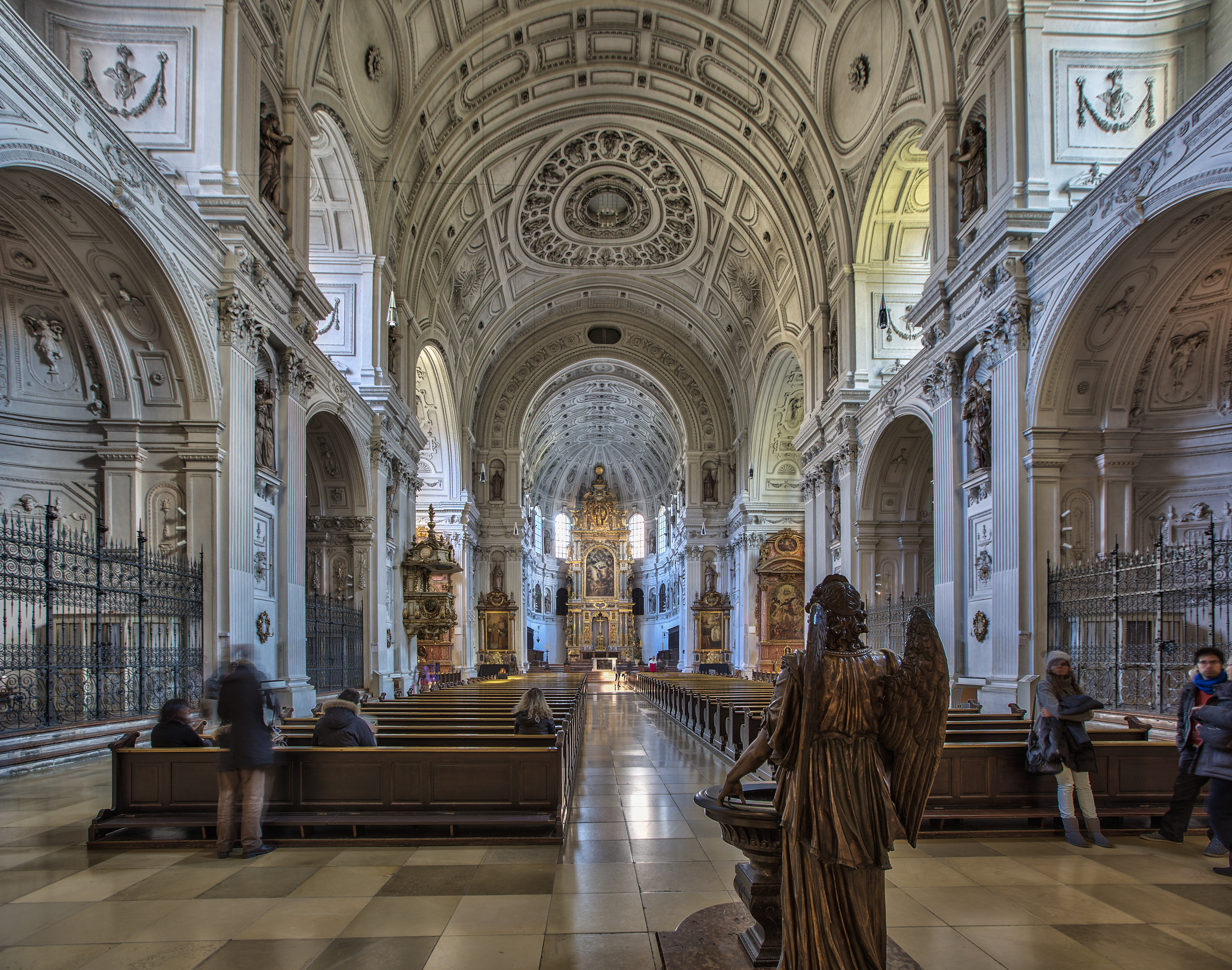
College church, Munich

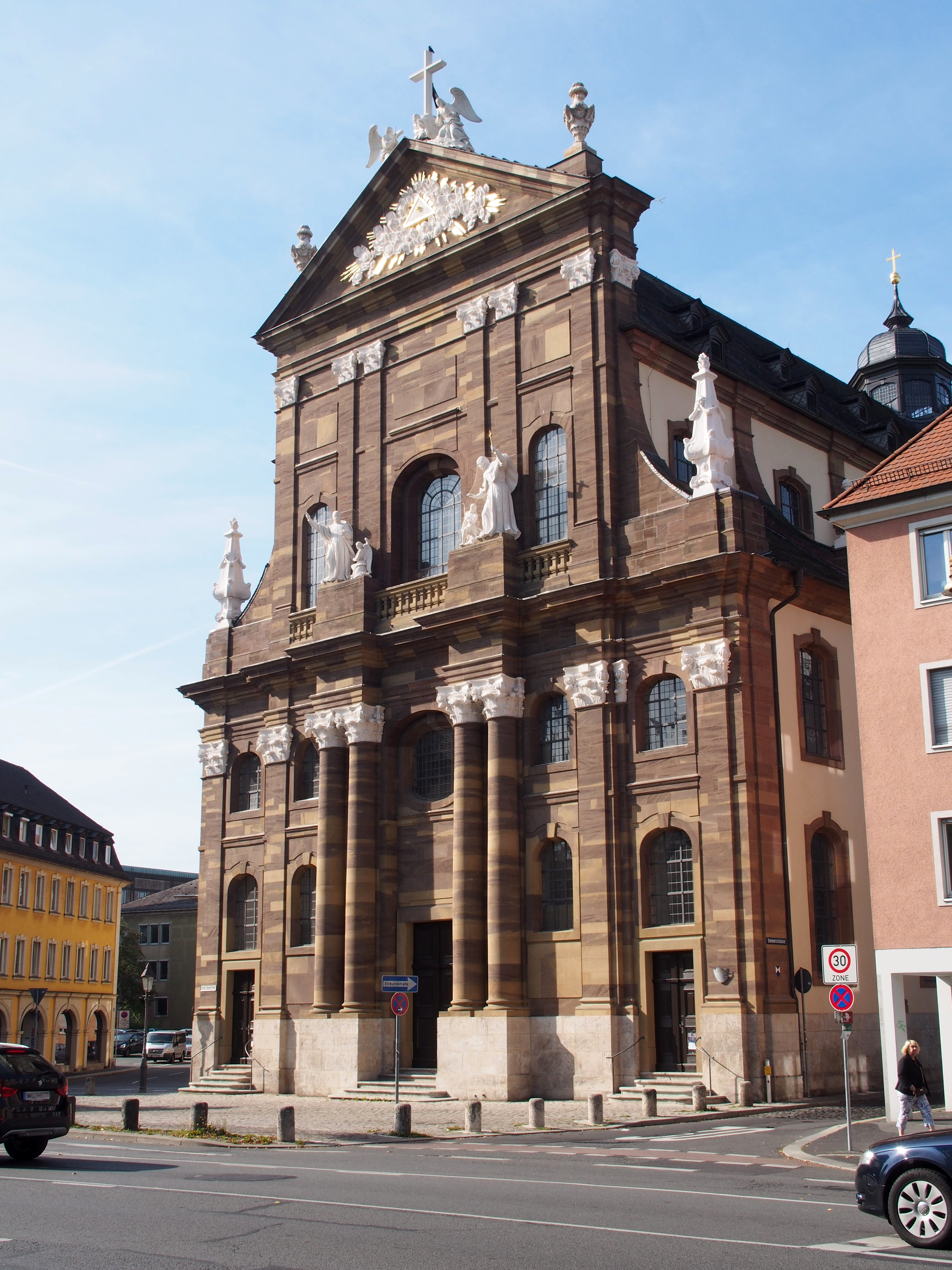
College church, Würzburg

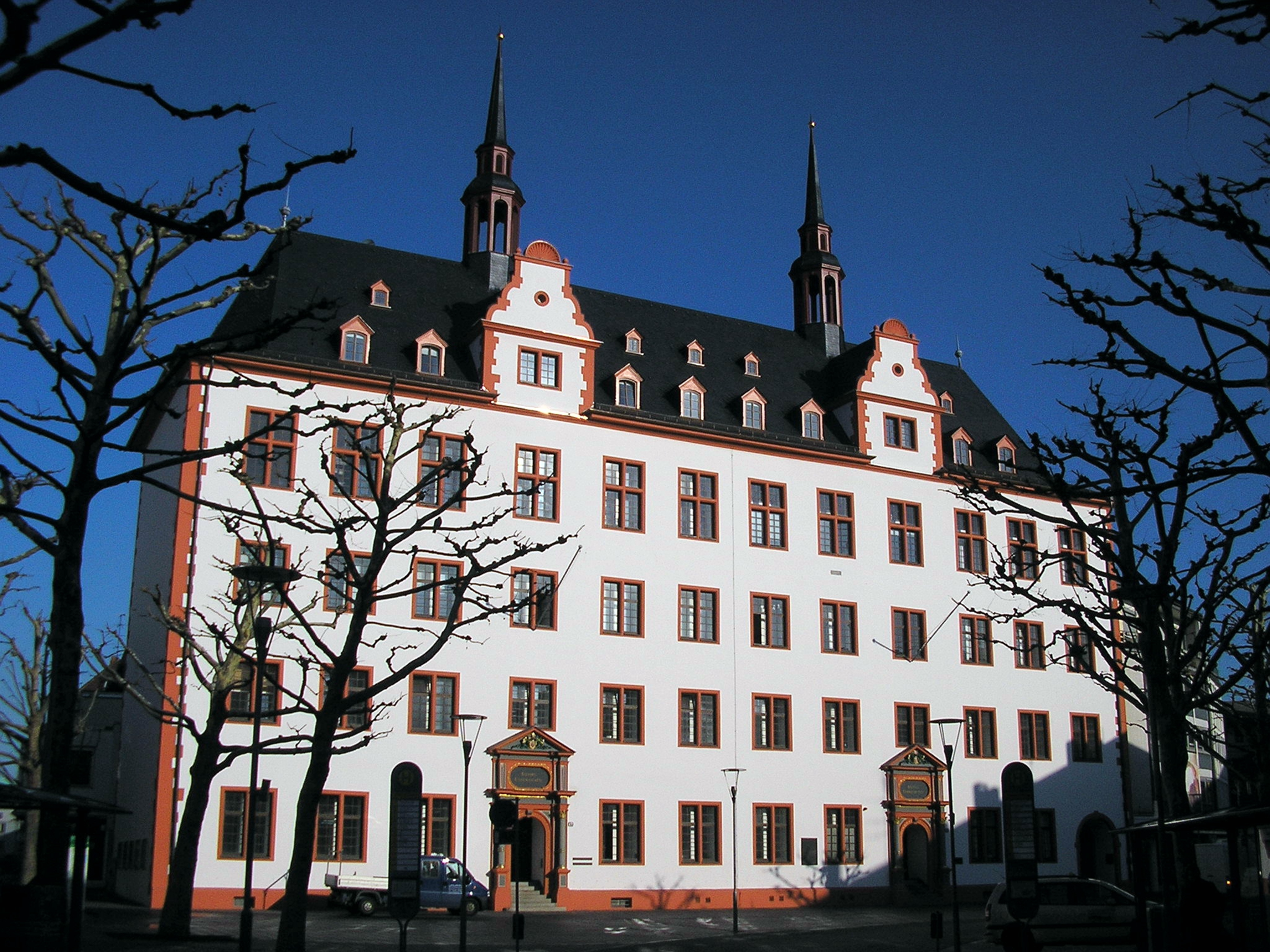
College in Mainz

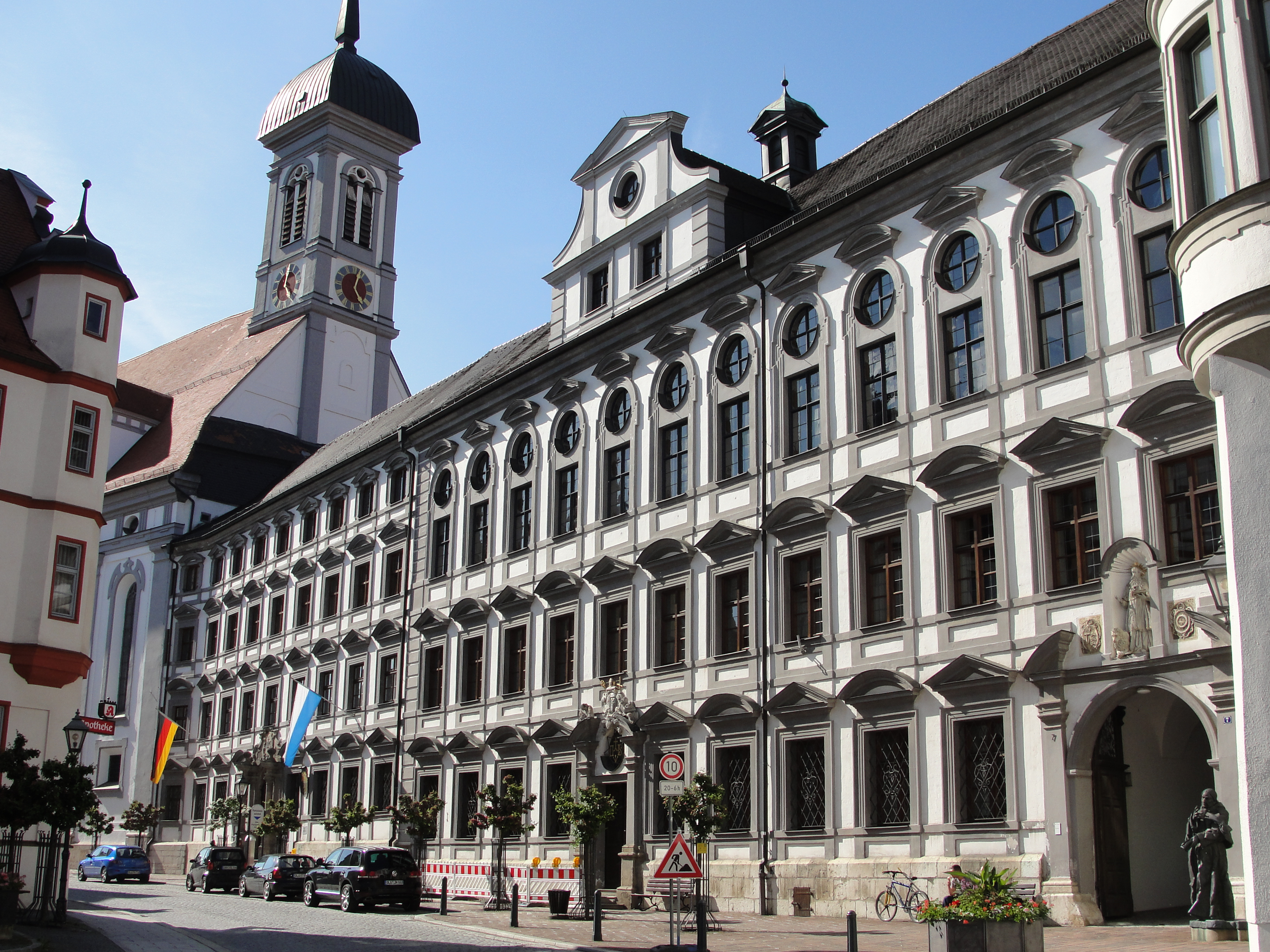
College in Dillingen

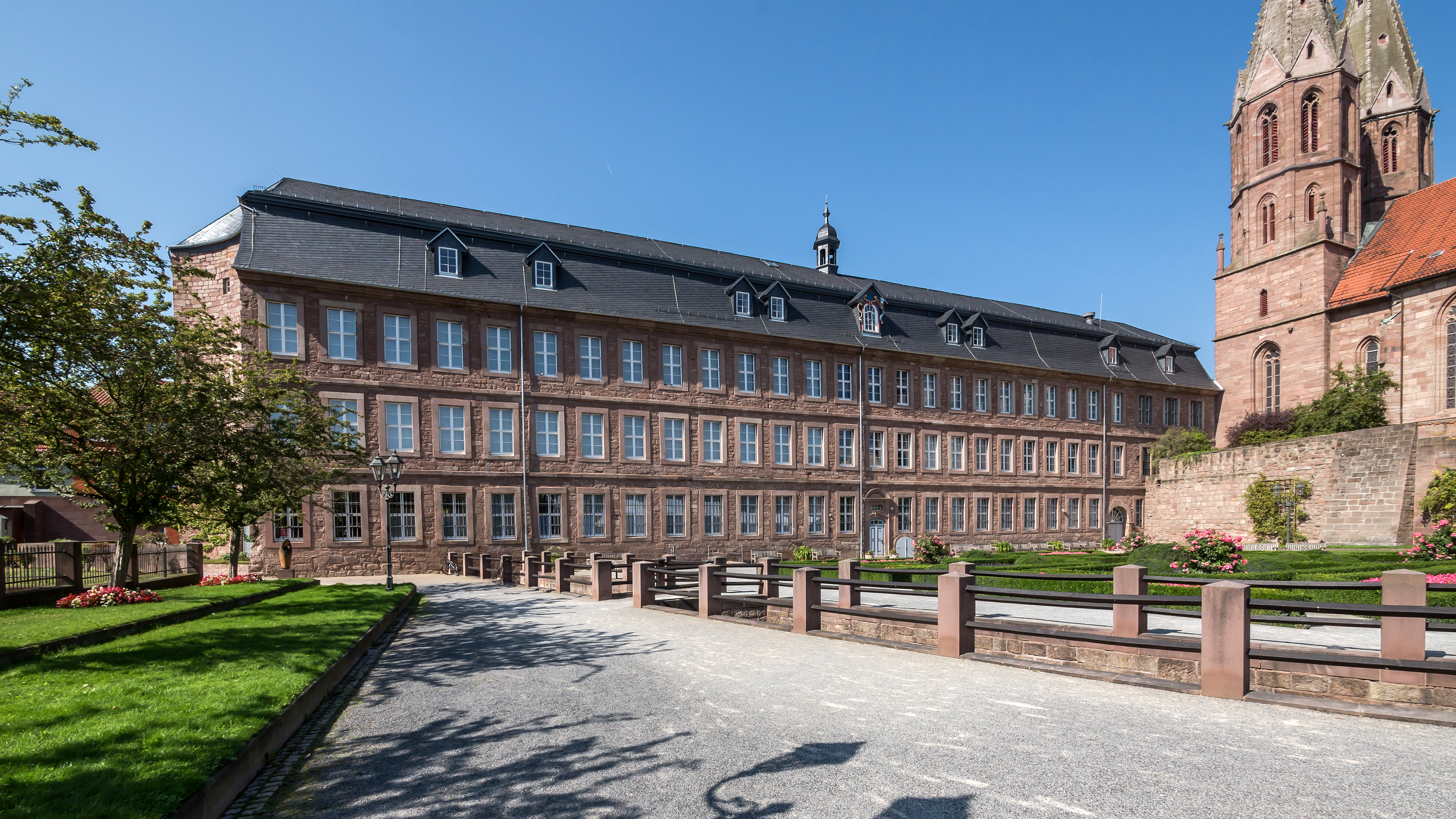
College in Heiligenstadt

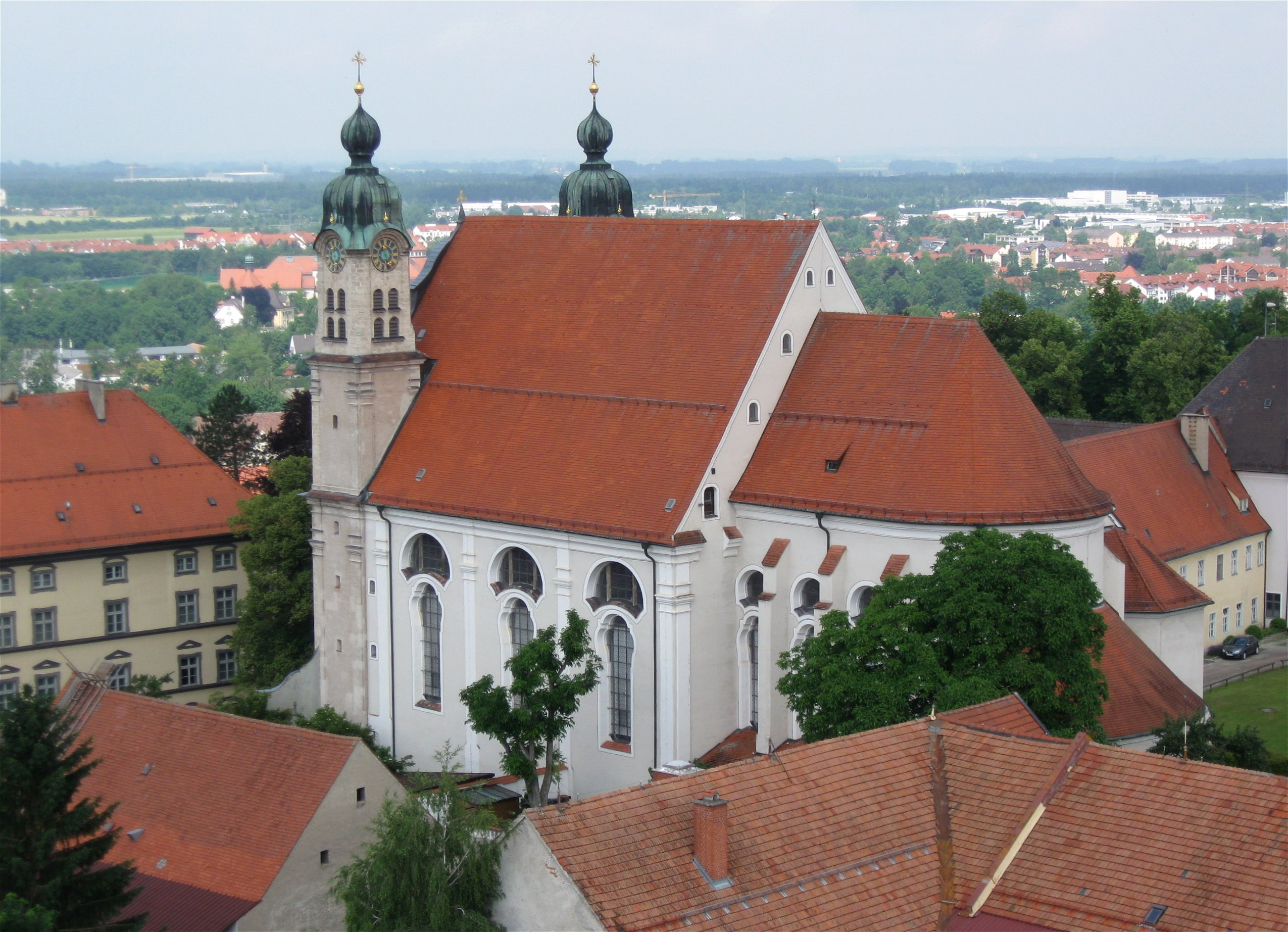
College church, Landsberg am Lech

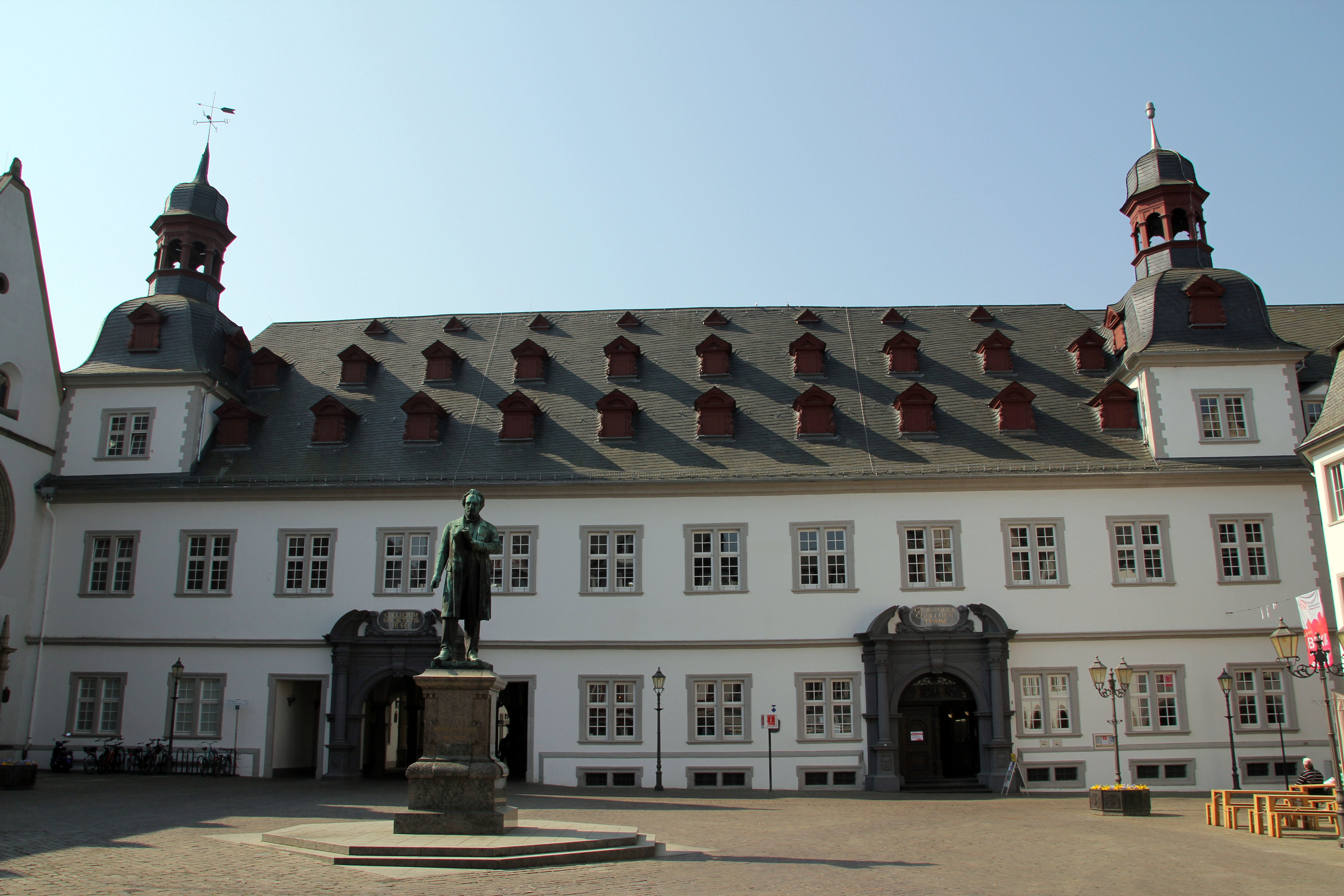
College in Koblenz

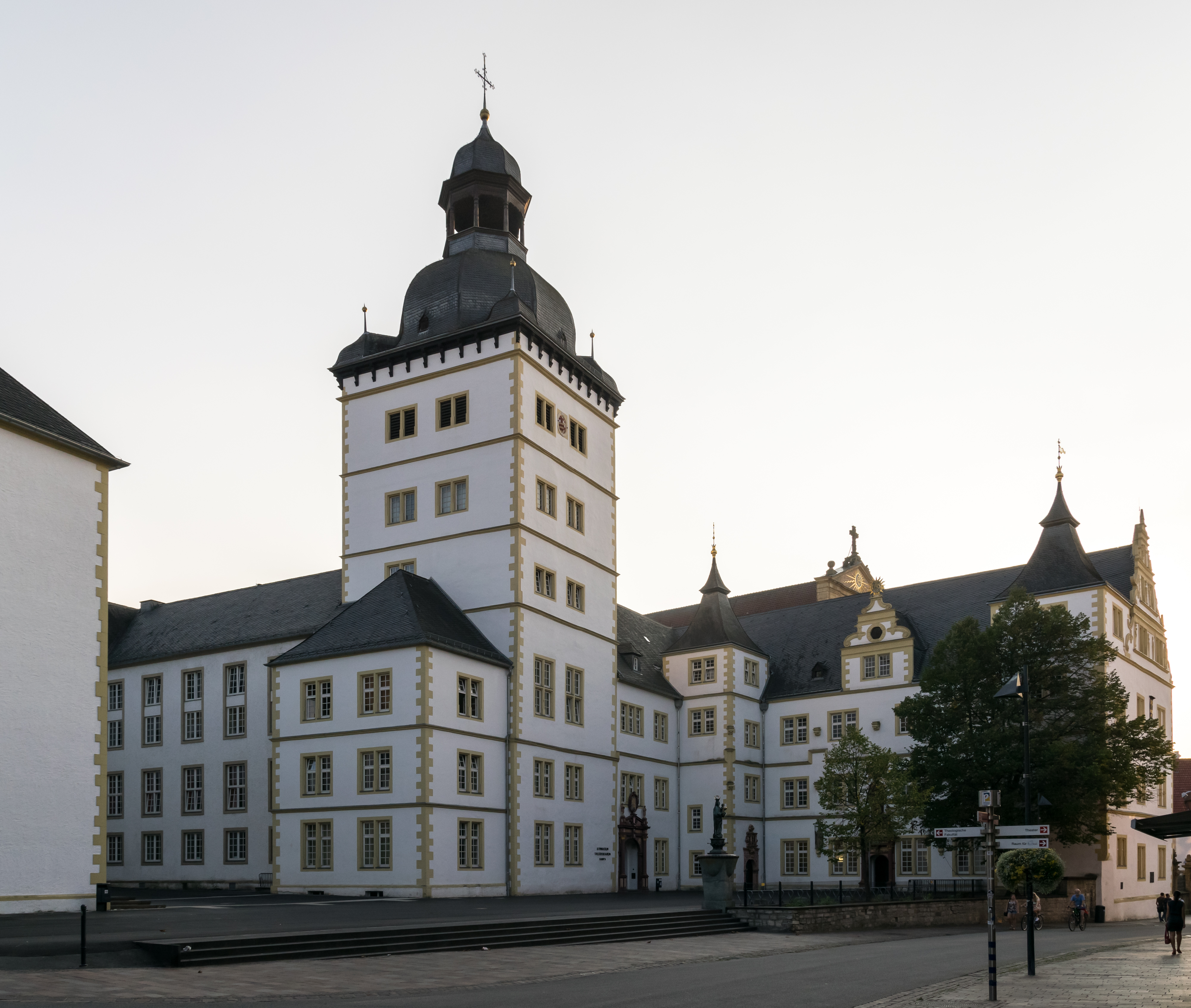
College in Paderborn

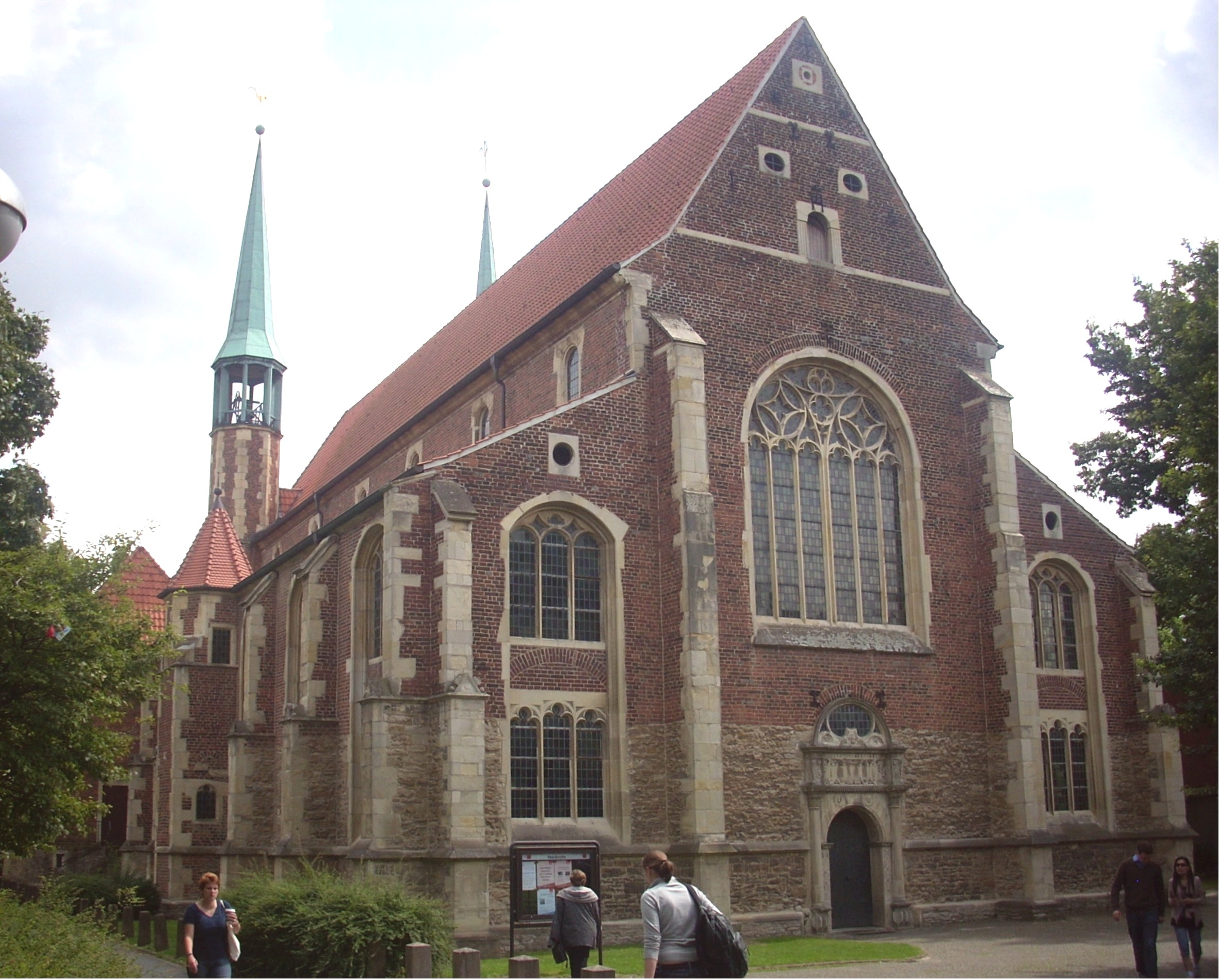
College church, Münster

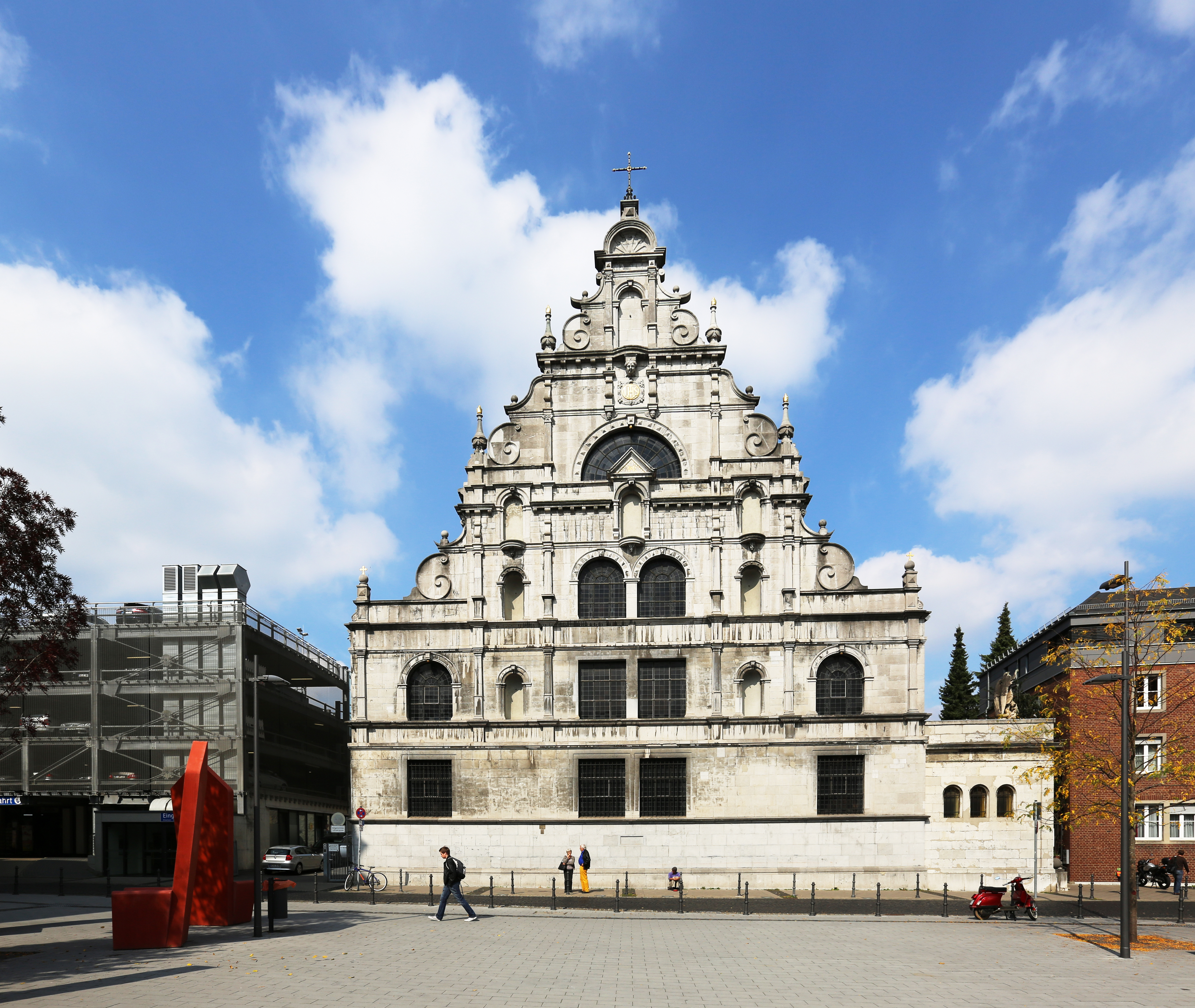
College church, Aachen

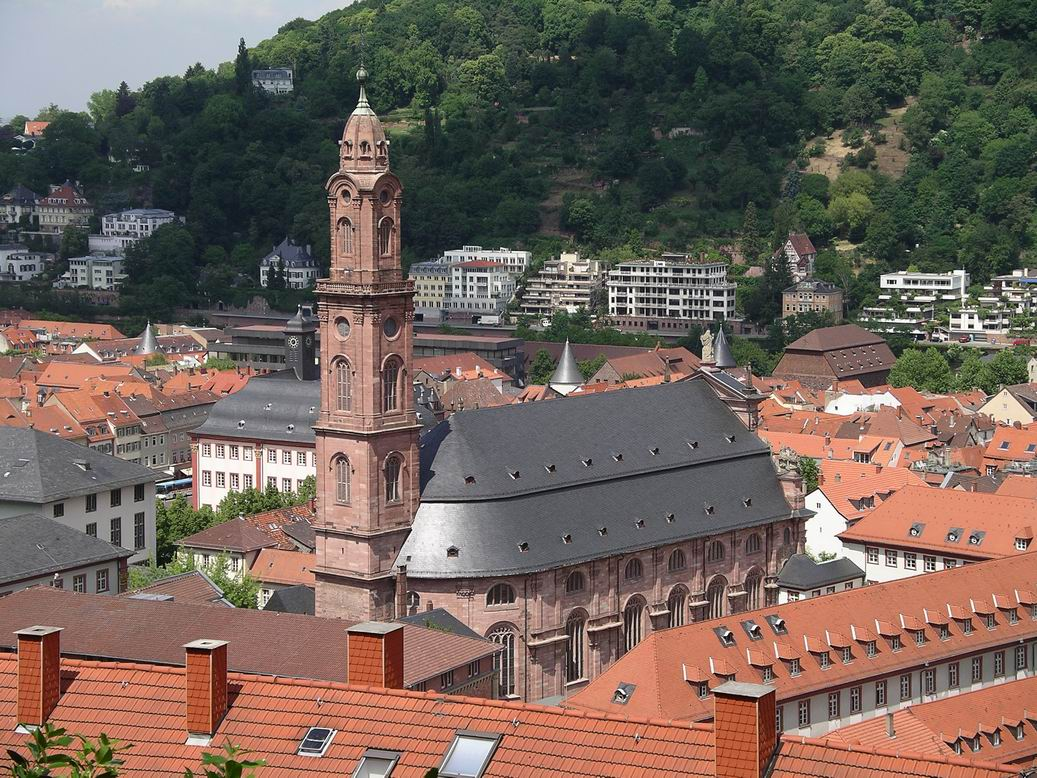
College church, Heidelberg

- Jesuit college in Cologne (1556–1773), now offices of the Bishopric and Church of St Mariä Himmelfahrt; precursor to Dreikönigsgymnasium
- Jesuit college in Ingolstadt, Bavaria (1556–1773), now Staatliche Fachober- und Berufsoberschule Ingolstadt and Canisius Convent; college church demolished 1859
- Wilhelminum college in Munich (1559–1773), now Old Academy, Bavarian Statistical Office and Church of Saint Michael; precursor to Wilhelmsgymnasium
  - The nearby Bürgersaalkirche was originally built 1709–1710 as an assembly hall of the Sodality of Our Lady
- Jesuit college in Trier (1561–1773), now episcopal seminary and Church of the Jesuits; precursor to Friedrich-Wilhelm-Gymnasium
- Jesuit college in Würzburg, Franconia (1561–1773), now part of University of Würzburg, episcopal seminary, and Church of Saint Michael; also precursor to Wirsberg-Gymnasium
- Palatine College of the Society of Jesus in Mainz, Rhineland (1561–1773), now Domus Universitatis of the University of Mainz; precursor to Rabanus-Maurus-Gymnasium
- Jesuit college in Dillingen an der Donau, Bavaria (1564–1773), overtaking the University of Dillingen, now Akademie für Lehrerfortbildung und Personalführung and Church of the Jesuits; precursor to Johann-Michael-Sailer-Gymnasium Dillingen
- Former abbey of the Poor Clares in Würzburg, Franconia (1567–1773)
- Jesuit college in Speyer, Rhineland (1567–1773), demolished in the 19th century except a crypt
- Jesuit college in Fulda, Hesse (1572–1773), now Vonderau Museum; precursor to the Fulda monastery school
- Jesuit college in Heiligenstadt, Thuringia (1575–1773), now Eichsfeldmuseum; precursor to Staatliches Gymnasium Johann-Georg Lingemann
- Jesuit college in Landsberg am Lech, Bavaria (1576–1773), now New Municipal Museum and Church of the Holy Cross
- Jesuit college in Koblenz, Rhineland (1582–1773), now Koblenz City Hall and Church of the Jesuits; precursor to Görres-Gymnasium
- Jesuit college St. Salvator in Augsburg (1582–1773), mostly demolished in the 19th century except a wing that includes the Kleiner Goldener Saal
- Jesuit college in Paderborn, Westphalia (1585–1773), from 1616 a university, now Gymnasium Theodorianum and Marktkirche
- Jesuit college in Friedberg, Bavaria (1587–1773), now municipal administration building
- Jesuit college in Münster, Westphalia (1588–1773), formerly Gymnasium Paulinum, now Church of Saint Peter; precursor to University of Münster
- Saint Paul college of the Mittelmünster monastery in Regensburg (1588–1773), destroyed in the Napoleonic Wars; precursor to Albertus-Magnus-Gymnasium
- Biburg Abbey in Biburg, Bavaria (1589–1773)
- Shrine of Our Lady of Altötting (1591–1773)
- Gut Warnberg manor in Munich (1594–1773), now a private school and horse-riding center
- Jesuit college in Hildesheim (1595–1773, with interruption during the Thirty Years' War), now Gymnasium Josephinum
- Jesuit monastery in Forstern, Bavaria (1595–1773)
- Himmelthal Abbey in Elsenfeld, Franconia (1595–1773)
- Ebersberg Monastery in Ebersberg, Bavaria (1595–1773), now a tax office and Church of Saint Sebastian
- Jesuitenhof in Dirmstein, Rhineland (late 16th century–1773), now a winery
- Jesuit college in Aachen (1600–1773), now St. Michael's Church; precursor to Kaiser-Karls-Gymnasium
- Jesuit college in Konstanz (1604–1773), now Jobcenter Landkreis Konstanz and Christ Church; precursor to Heinrich-Suso-Gymnasium
- Patershausen monastery in Heusenstamm (1605–1724), now a farm
- Jesuit college in Xanten, Rhineland (1609–1773)
- Jesuit college in Erfurt, Thuringia (1611–1773), with one wing still extant on Schlösserstrasse
- Jesuit University in Bamberg, Franconia (1611–1773), now part of University of Bamberg and Church of Saint Martin; precursor to Kaiser-Heinrich-Gymnasium
- Jesuit college in Passau, Bavaria (1611–1773), now Gymnasium Leopoldinum, Bavarian State Library and St. Michael's Church
- Jesuit college in Aschaffenburg, Franconia (1612–1773), now Christian Schad Museum and Church of the Jesuits, the latter now an exhibition hall; precursor to Kronberg-Gymnasium Aschaffenburg
- Jesuit college in Worms (1613–1773, with interruption during the Nine Years' War), now Magnuskirche; precursor to Rudi-Stephan-Gymnasium
- Jesuit college in Eichstätt, Bavaria (1614–1773); now Collegium Willibaldinum and Church of the Guardian Angel; precursor to Catholic University of Eichstätt-Ingolstadt
- Jesuit college in Neuss, Rhineland (1616–1773), since demolished; precursor to Quirinus-Gymnasium Neuss
- Jesuit college in Mindelheim, Bavarian Swabia (1618–1773), now Textile Museum, South Swabia Archaeology Museum and Church of the Annunciation
- Jesuit college in Düsseldorf (1619–1773), later City Hall, now Hotel De Medici and Church of Saint Andrew; precursor to Görres-Gymnasium (Düsseldorf)
- Jesuit college of the University of Freiburg in Freiburg im Breisgau (1620–1773), now University College Freiburg, Uniseum and University Church; also precursor to Berthold-Gymnasium Freiburg
- Jesuit college in Benedictine convent in Neuburg an der Donau, Bavaria (1622–1773), now a school
- Jesuit college in Baden-Baden (1622–1773), now municipal administrative offices
- Jesuit college in Bad Münstereifel, Rhineland (1625–1773), now Saint Michael Gymnasium and Church of Saint Donatus
- Jesuit college in Amberg, Bavaria (1626–1773), now Provinzialbibliothek Amberg and Church of Saint George
- Jesuit college in Burghausen, Bavaria (1627–1773), now Kurfürst-Maximilian-Gymnasium Burghausen and Church of Saint Joseph
- Kastl Abbey in Kastl, Bavaria (1627–1773)
- Former Augustinian monastery in Mindelheim, Bavarian Swabia (1618–1773)
- Jesuit college in Coesfeld, North Rhineland (1627–1773), later Schloss Liebfrauenburg, now municipal administrative offices and Church of the Jesuits; precursor to Gymnasium Nepomucenum Coesfeld
- Jesuit college in Kaufbeuren, Bavarian Swabia (1627–1773, with interruption 1649–1651), now rectory of the Parish Church of Saint Martin
- Jesuit college in Düren, Eifel (1629–1773), destroyed during World War II
- Jesuit college in Landshut, Bavaria (1629–1773), now police inspectorate office and Church of Saint Ignatius; precursor to Hans-Carossa-Gymnasium Landshut
- Jesuit college in Goslar (1630–1632); the unfinished buildings collapsed in 1722
- Jesuit college in Straubing, Bavaria (1631–1773), now police inspectorate office and Jesuitenkirche; precursor to Johannes-Turmair-Gymnasium
- Jesuit monastery in Hadamar, Hesse (1639–1773), now offices of the Diocese of Limburg and Church of John of Nepomuk; precursor to Fürst-Johann-Ludwig-Schule
- Jesuit college in Osnabrück, Westphalia (1625–1773 with interruption 1633–1650), now Gymnasium Carolinum and Kleine Kirche
- Jesuit college in Meppen, Emsland (1642–1773), now Windthorst-Gymnasium and Gymnasialkirche
- Jesuit college in Ellwangen, Swabia (1658–1773) next to Ellwangen Abbey, now Landgericht and Evangelical Church; precursor to Peutinger-Gymnasium Ellwangen
- Weggental pilgrimage church near Rottenburg am Neckar (1658–1773)
- Jesuit college in Jülich, Rhineland (1664–1773), destroyed in 1945; precursor to Gymnasium Zitadelle Jülich
- Jesuit residence at Echenbrunn Abbey in Gundelfingen an der Donau, Bavaria (1672–1773), now Church of Maria Immaculata
- Jesuit college in Bonn (1673–1773), now Church of the Name of Jesus; precursor to Beethoven-Gymnasium Bonn
- Stockau Castle in Reichertshofen, Bavaria (1685–1773)
- Jesuit school in Wetzlar (1695–1773)
- Jesuit college of Heidelberg University in Heidelberg (1698–1773), now Anglistisches Seminar and Church of the Jesuits
- Jesuit novitiate in Mainz (1701–1773), now a retirement home (rebuilt after World War II) and Chapel of Saint Joseph
- Church of Our Lady in Siegen, Westphalia (1702–1773)
- Neuburg Abbey near Heidelberg (1706–1773)
- Jesuit college in Büren, Westphalia (1719–1773), now Mauritius-Gymnasium and Church of Maria Immaculata
- Jesuit college in Mannheim, Rhineland (1720–1773), now church offices, Ursulinen-Gymnasium, Mannheim Observatory, and Jesuit Church; predecessor to Karl-Friedrich-Gymnasium
- University of Fulda in Fulda, Hesse (1734–1773), now Adolf-von-Dalberg-Schule
- Jesuit school in Bruchsal (1753–1773) in the Old Episcopal Castle; precursor to Schönborn-Gymnasium Bruchsal
- Jesuit observatory at Schwetzingen Palace (1761–1770s)
- Mannheim Observatory (1772–1788)
- Jesuit college and monastery in Maria Laach Abbey (1820–1872), now a Beuronese monastery
- Gorheim Monastery in Sigmaringen (1852–1872), now a Franciscan monastery
- Jesuit residence in Aachen (1858–1872)
- Aloysius College in Bonn (since 1921, with interruption 1938–1946)
- Haus HohenEichen in Dresden (since 1921, with interruption 1941–1945)
- Canisius College in Berlin (since 1925, with interruption 1940–1945)
- Munich School of Philosophy in Munich (since 1925)
- Sankt Georgen Graduate School of Philosophy and Theology in Frankfurt (since 1926)
- Canisianum in Saarlouis (1929–2007), now a facility of the Priestly Fraternity of Saint Peter
- Saint Blasius College in Sankt Blasien (since 1934, with interruption 1939–1945)
- Saint Ansgar School in Hamburg (1946–1993)
- Church of Saint Peter am Perlach in Augsburg (1954–2010)
- Church of Saint Peter in Cologne (since 1960)
- Heinrich Pesch House in Ludwigshafen (since 2013)

=== Greece ===
- Jesuit mission on Chios Island (1590–18th century)
- Jesuit complex in Kalamitsia on Naxos Island (late 17th century), now in ruins
- Jesuit establishment beneath Exomvourgo Mountain on Tinos Island (1660s–1846), now Greek Catholic monastery of the Sacred Heart of Jesus
- Jesuit mission in Thessaloniki (1706–1784)
- Jesuit monastery on Syros Island (1744-?)
- Jesuit monastery in the village of Loutra on Tinos Island (since 1837), hosting a Folk Museum since 1994

=== Hungary ===
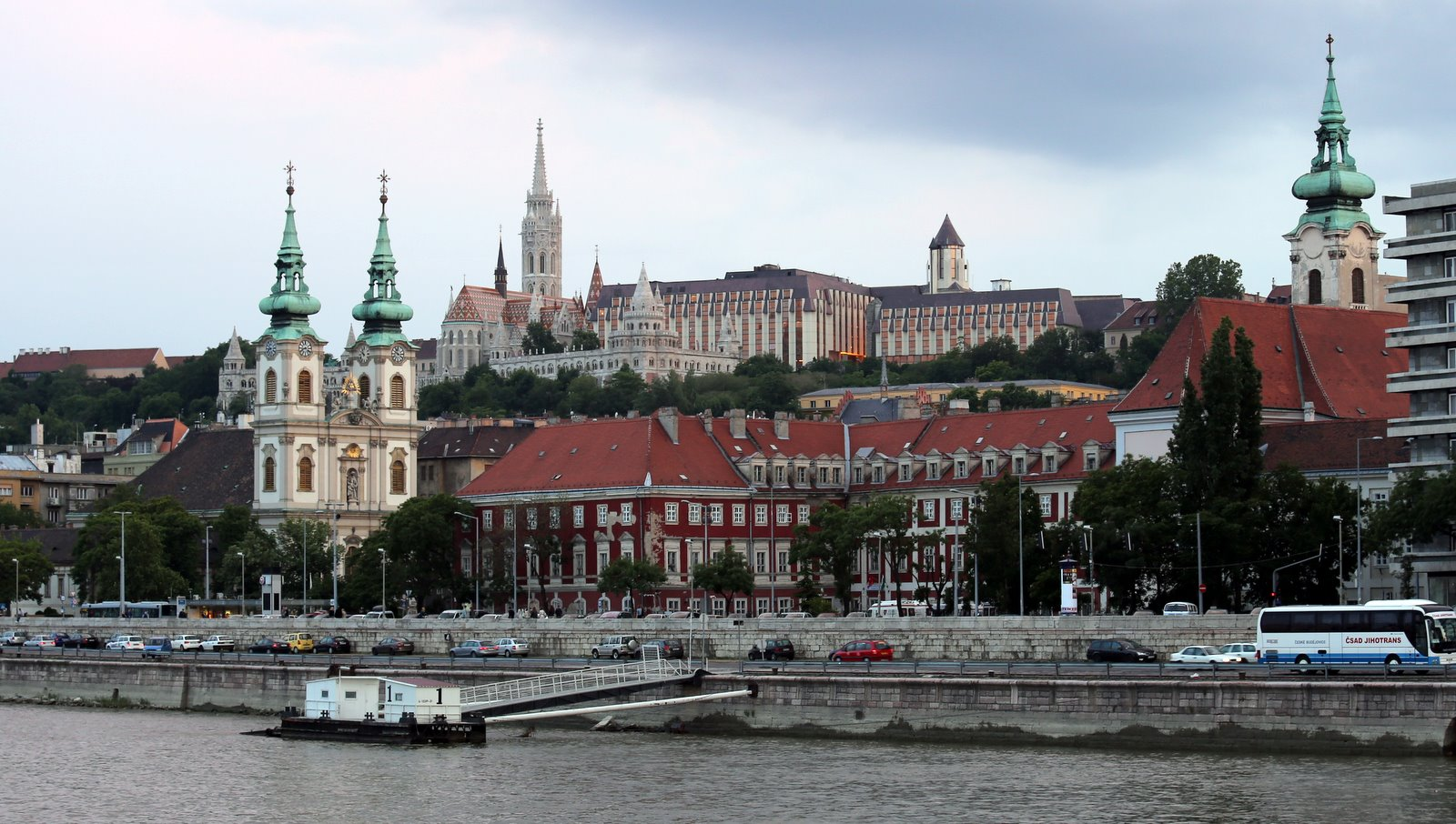
View of Buda with the church of Saint Anne (left), Matthias Church and Hilton Hotel on the grounds of the Jesuit college (background)

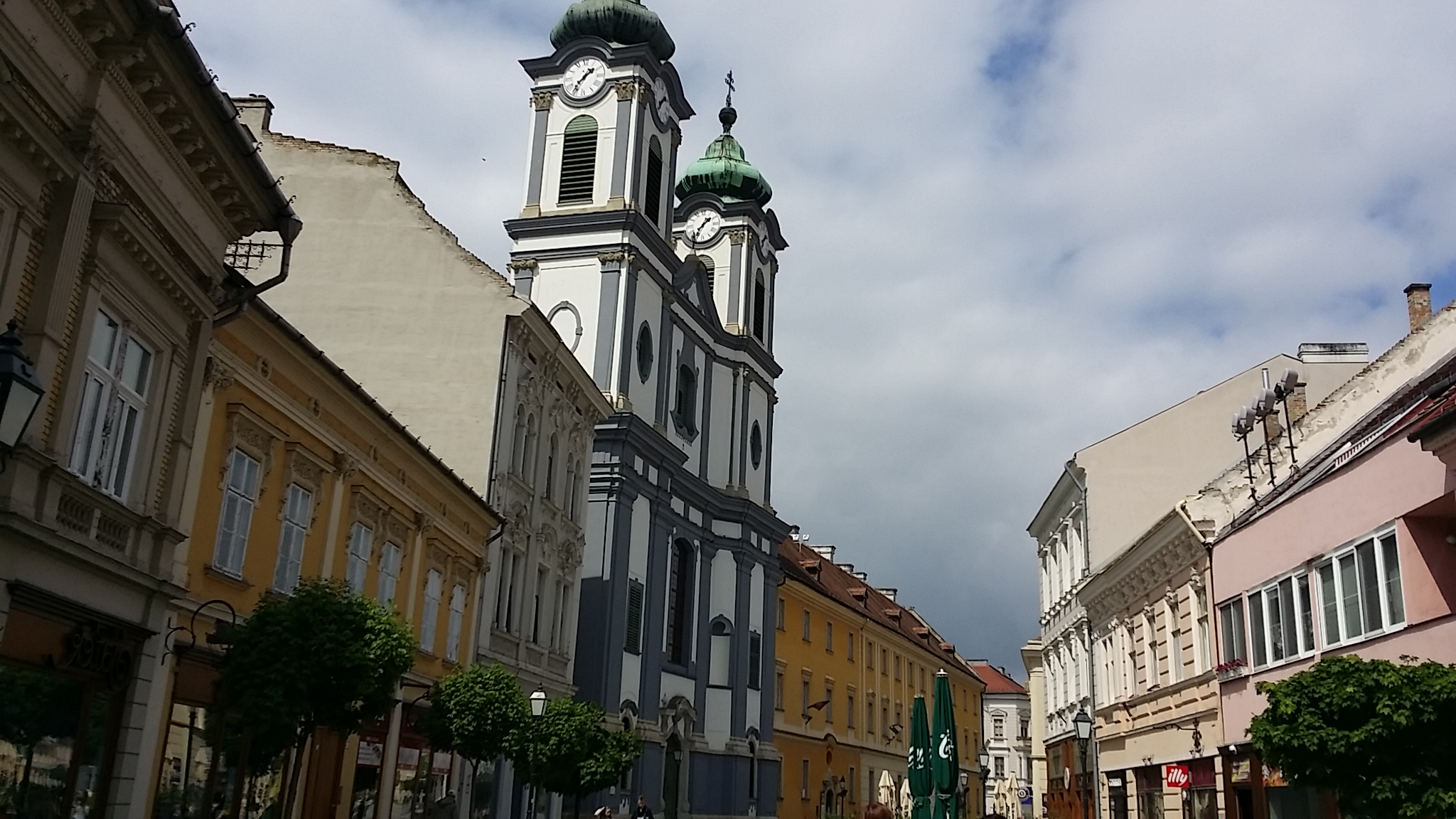
College at Székesfehérvár

- Jesuit missions in Pécs (from 1612), Kecskemét (from 1633), Andocs (from 1642) and Veszprém in Ottoman Hungary (17th century)
- Jesuit college in Győr (1627–1773), now benedictine priory and Church of Saint Ignatius
- Jesuit residence in Gyöngyös (1633–1773), now János Pátzay Catholic Music School; precursor to Berze Nagy János Gimnázium
- Jesuit college in Sopron (1637–1773)
- Jesuit college in Kőszeg (1677–1773), now Church of Saint James
- Jesuit college on Buda Hill (1686–1773), now Hilton Budapest and Matthias Church
- Parish Church of Saint Anne in Buda (1686–1773 with interruption 1693–1723)
- Jesuit residence in Esztergom (1686–1773), now Christian Museum and Parish Church of Saint Ignatius
- Jesuit college in Székesfehérvár (1688–1773), now King Saint Stephen Museum and Church of the Assumption and Saint John of Nepomuk
- Candlemas Church of the Blessed Virgin Mary in the former Mosque of Pasha Qasim in Pécs (1699–1773)
- Jesuit college in Eger (1699–1773), now Géza Gárdonyi Cistsrcian School and Cistercian Church
- Jesuit college in Pest (1702–1773), now Piarist Gymnasium and Inner City Parish Church
- Stephaneum Gymnasium in Kalocsa (1860–1945)
- Sacred Heart of Jesus Church in Budapest (1888–1945 and since 1989)
- Saint Ignatius Jesuit College of Excellence in Budapest (since 1990)
- Fényi Gyula Jesuit High School in Miskolc (since 1994)

=== Ireland ===
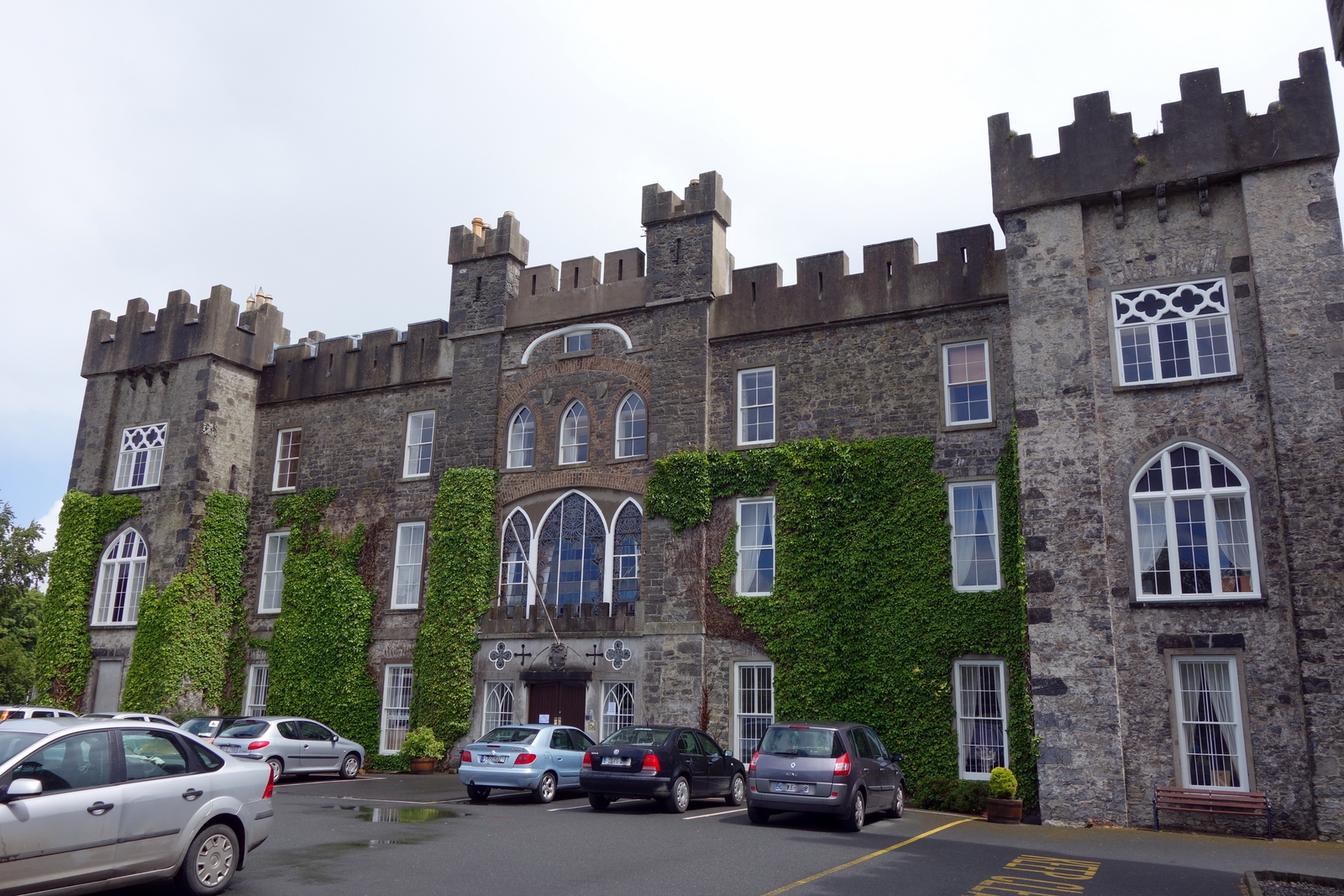
Clongowes Wood College

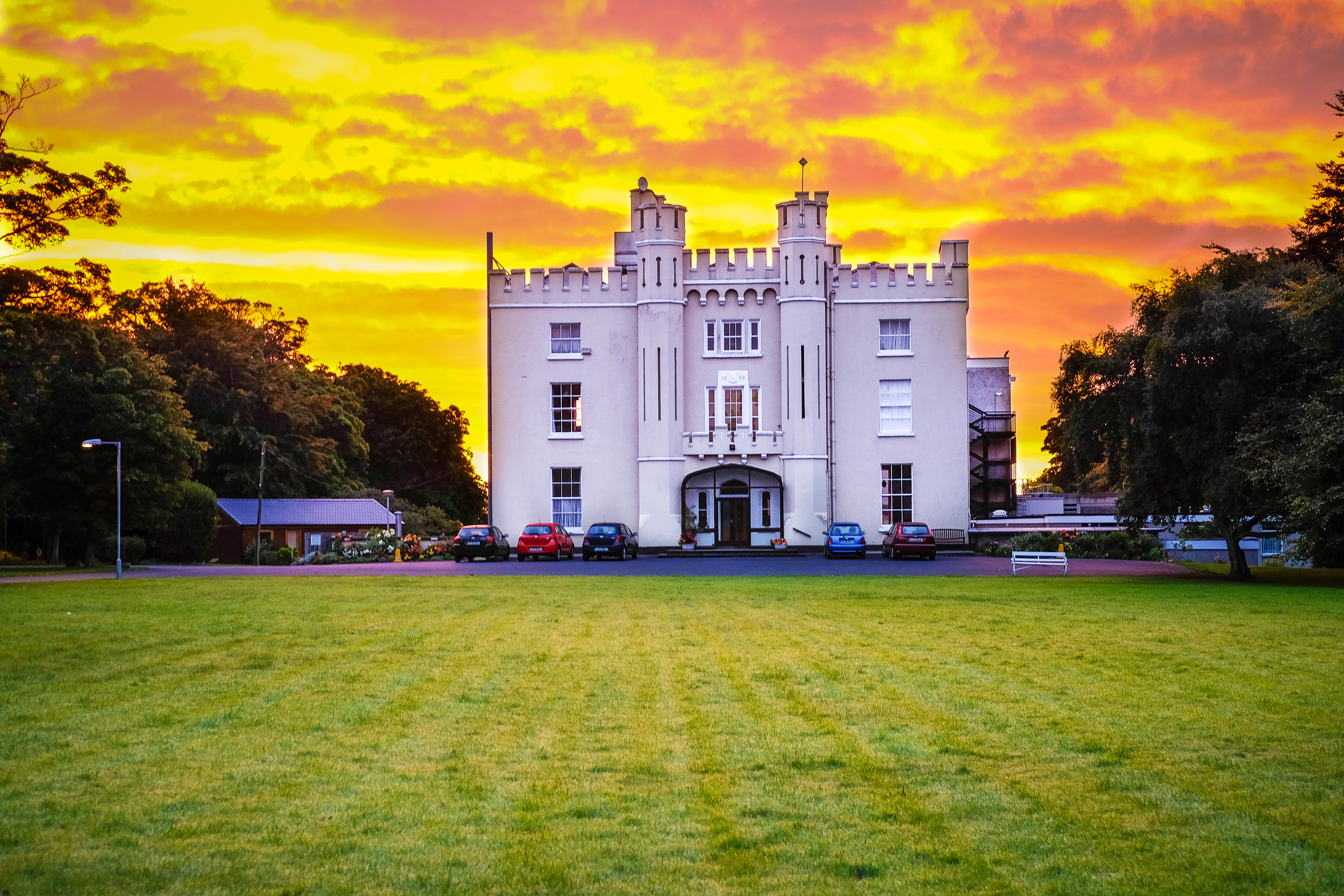
Manresa House, Dublin

- Jesuit schools in Limerick (1565–1773, with multiple interruptions), no longer extant
- Jesuit college in Galway (1620–1773, with multiple interruptions)
- Clongowes Wood College near Clane, County Kildare (since 1814)
- St Stanislaus College in Tullabeg, County Offaly (1818–1991)
- Church of Saint Francis Xavier in Dublin (since 1829)
- Belvedere College in Dublin (since 1832)
- Crescent College in Limerick (since 1859)
- Coláiste Iognáid (Ignatius College) and St Ignatius Church in Galway (since 1859)
- Milltown Institute of Theology and Philosophy in Dublin (1860–2015)
- Mungret College near Limerick (1882–1974)
- Emo Court in County Laois (1930–1969)
- Manresa House in Dublin (since 1948)
- Gonzaga College in Dublin (since 1950)
- St Declan's School in Dublin (since 1958)

=== Italy (outside Rome) ===
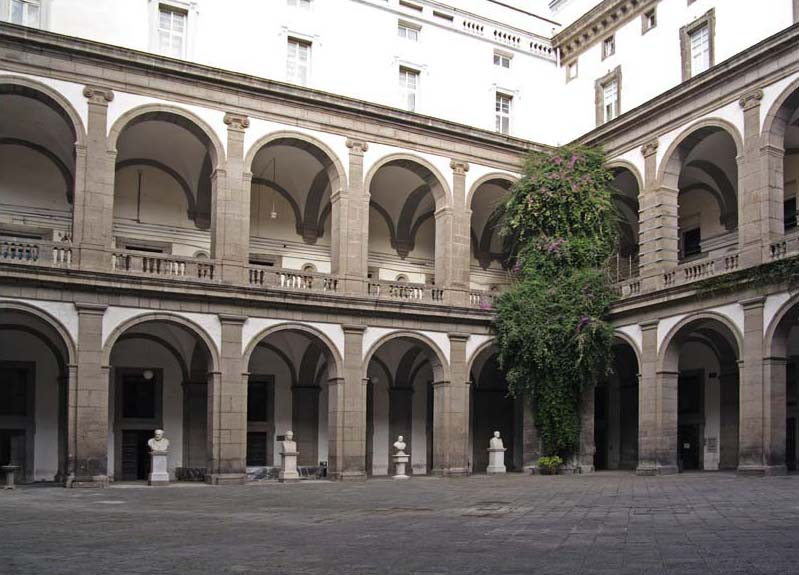
College in Naples

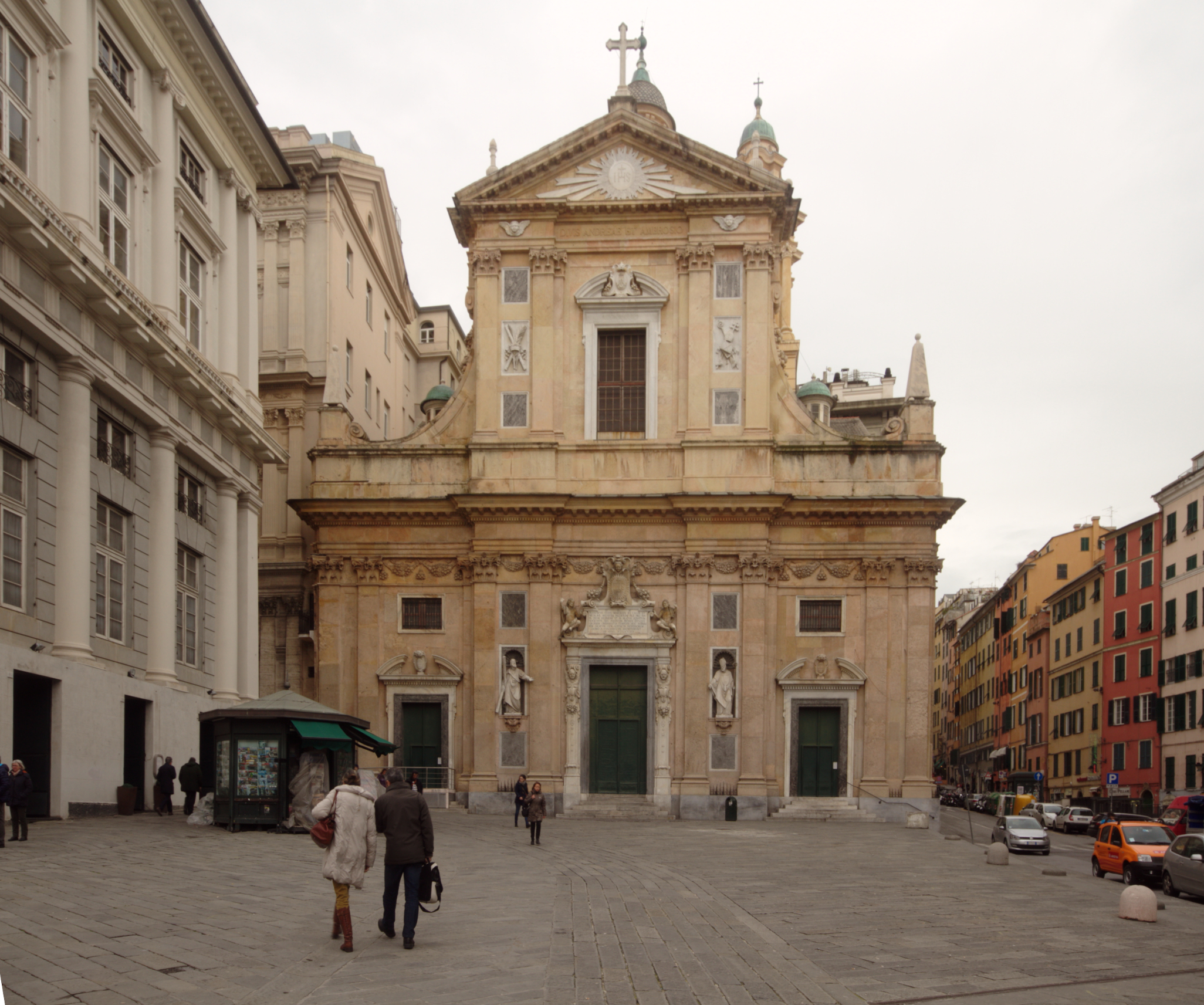
College church, Genoa

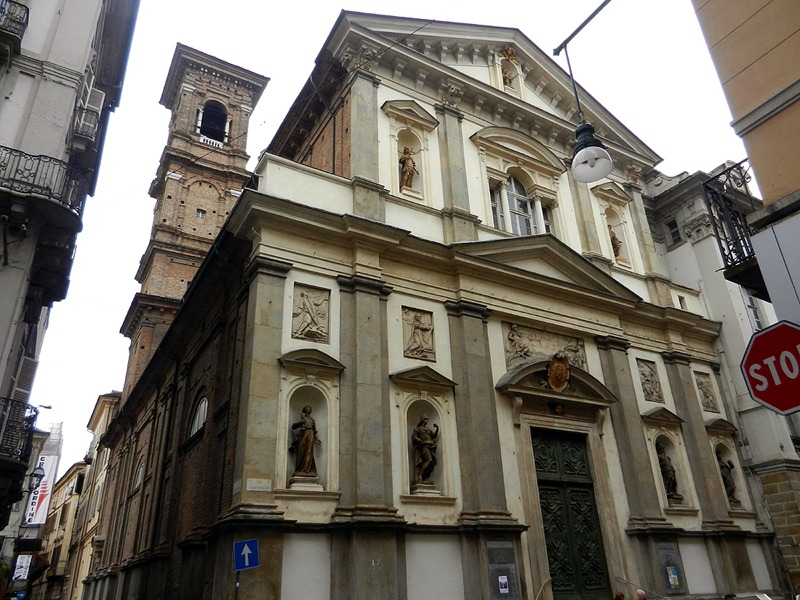
College church, Turin

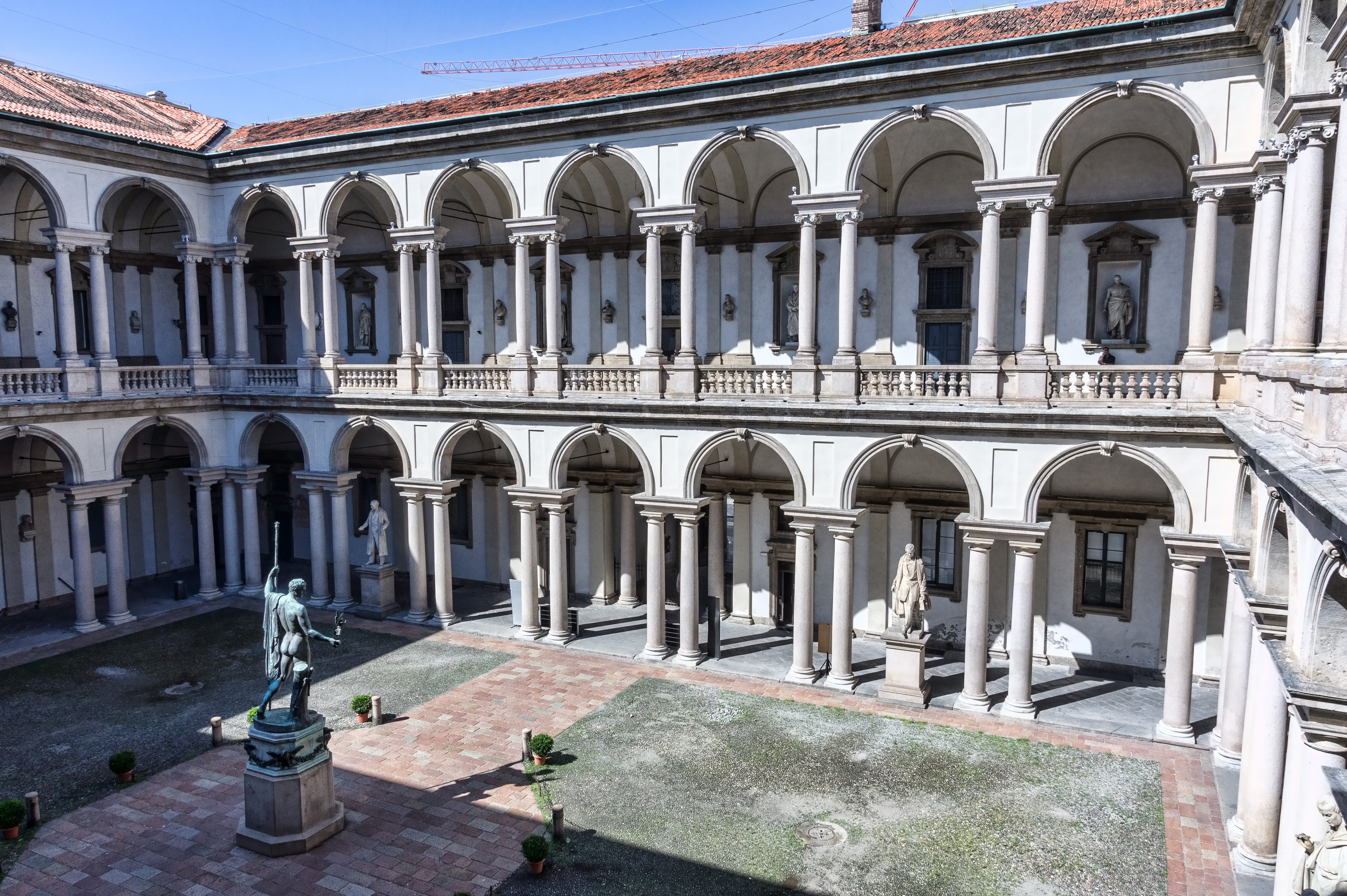
Brera college, Milan

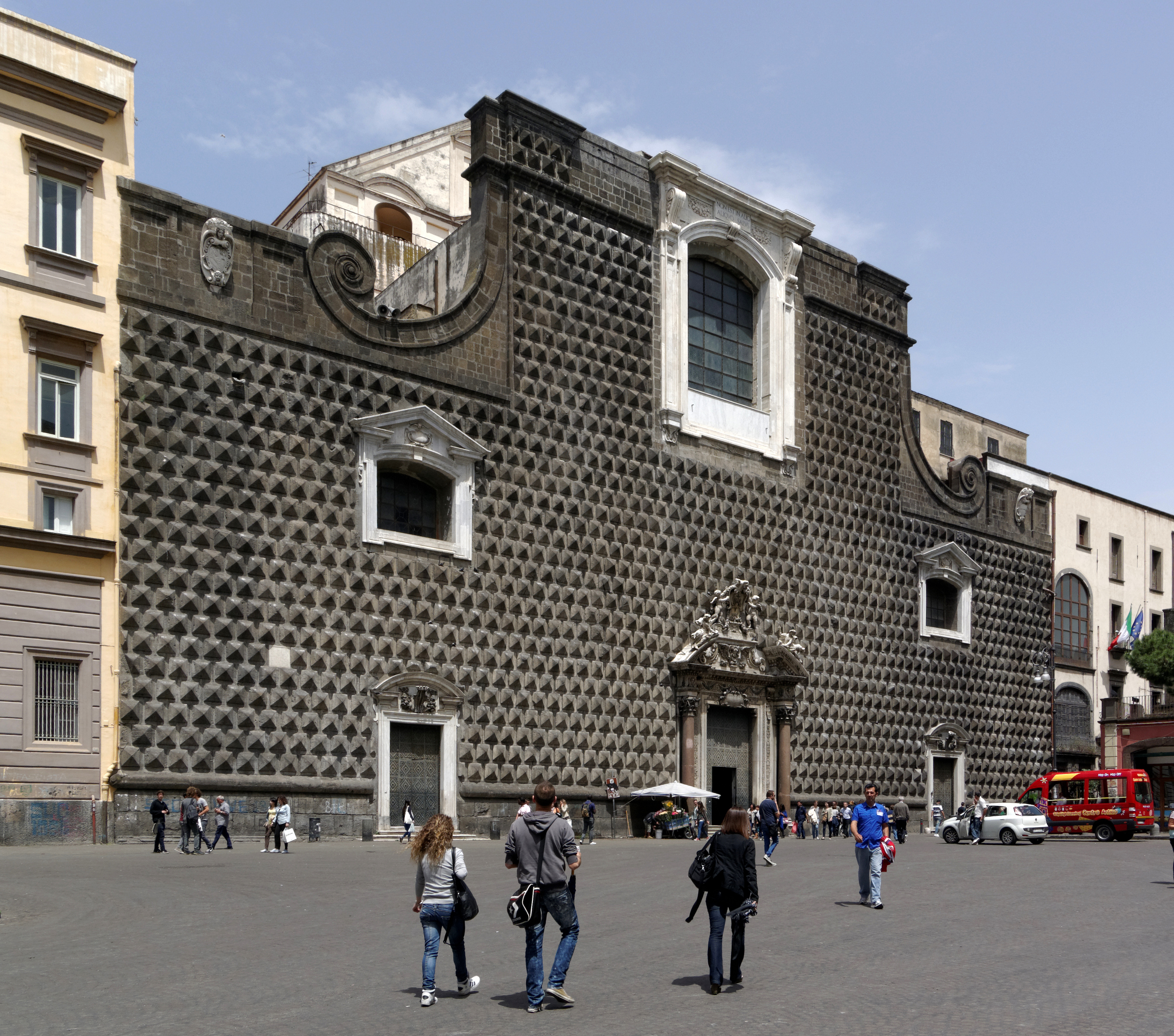
Professed house (Gesù Nuovo), Naples

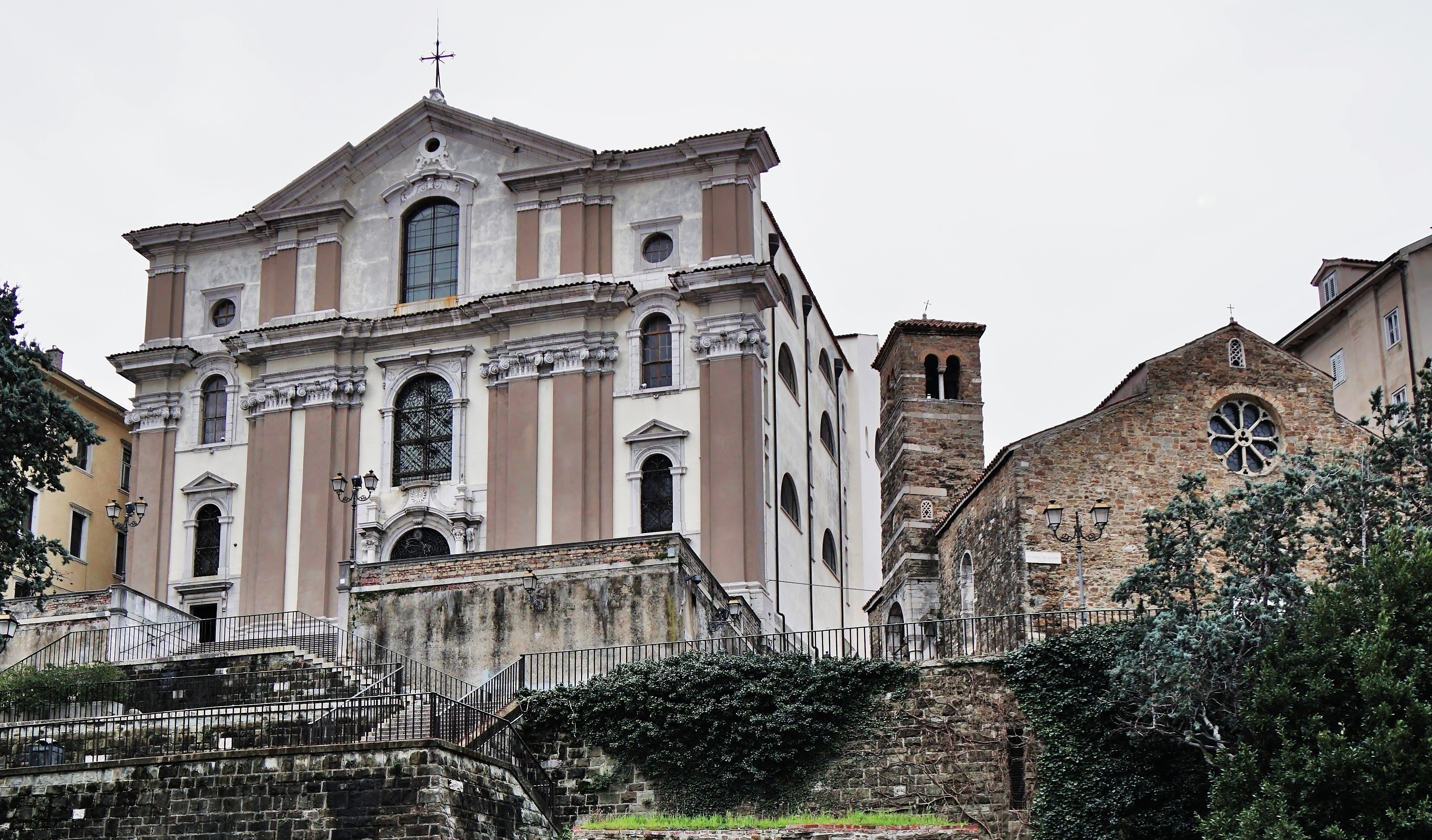
College church, Trieste

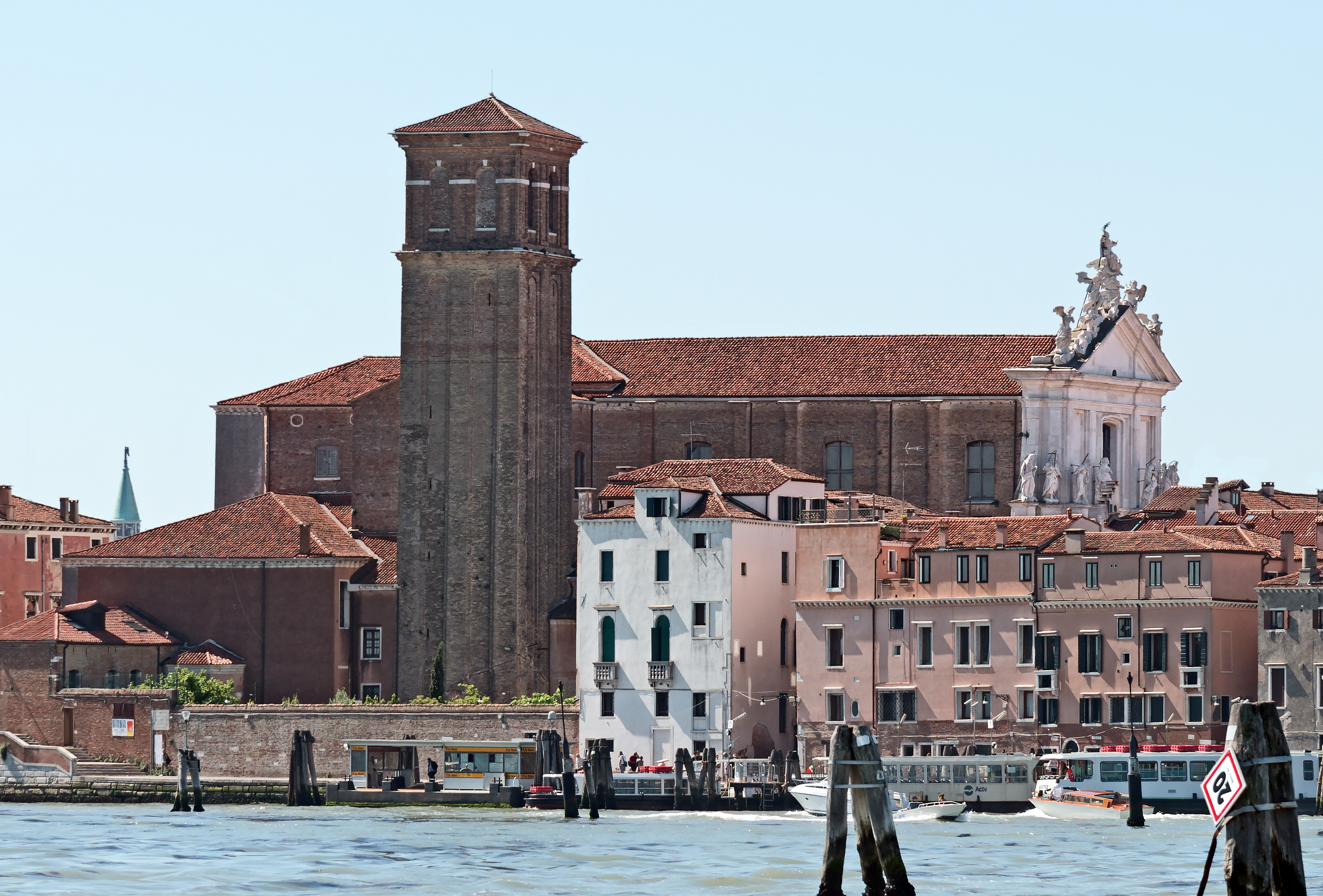
College in Venice

==== Mainland ====
- First Jesuit college in Venice (1550–1591)
- Jesuit college in Tivoli (c.1550–1773); church destroyed by bombing in 1944
- Jesuit college in Bologna (1551–1773), now Luigi Galvani State Lyceum-Gymnasium and Church of Santa Lucia
- Jesuit college in Ferrara (1551–1773), now Palace of Justice and Church of the Gesù, the latter under Jesuit care again since 1814
- Jesuit college in Padua (1552–1591)
- Collegium Maximum in Naples (1552–1767, 1801–1806, 1827–1848 and 1849–1860), now Casa del Salvatore of University of Naples Federico II, including the University Library, and Basilica of the Gesù Vecchio
- Jesuit college in Genoa (1554–1773), now Church of the Gesù and Saints Ambrosius and Andrew
- Jesuit college in Siena (1556–1759), now rectorate of the University of Siena and Church of San Vigilio
- Collegio degli Scolopi in Florence (1557–1775), now Liceo classico statale Galileo, Osservatorio Ximeniano, and church of San Giovannino degli Scolopi
- Jesuit college in Frascati (1559–1773), now Church of the Gesù
- Jesuit college in Macerata (1561–1773), now Istituto Storico della Resistenza e dell'Età Contemporanea "M. Morbiducci" and Church of Saint John
- Jesuit college in Palazzo del Capitano del Popolo in Perugia (1562–1773), now Palace of Justice and Church of the Gesù
- Jesuit college in Parma (1564–1768), from 1599 University of Parma, now still a building of the university and Church of San Rocco
- Jesuit college in Turin (1566–1773), now Centro InformaGiovani and Church of the Saint Martyrs
- Professed house in Milan (1567–1773), now Church of San Fedele
- Jesuit college in Brescia (1568–1606 and 1657–1773), now a school and Church of Santa Maria delle Grazie
- Jesuit college in Genoa (1569–1773), now University of Genoa and Church of Saints Jerome and Francis Xavier
- College of the Brera in the Brera district of Milan (1571–1773), now Brera Academy, Pinacoteca di Brera, Biblioteca di Brera, and remains of the church of Santa Maria in Brera
  - the Brera Astronomical Observatory was created there by the Jesuits in 1764
- Jesuit college in Lecce (1575–1767), now Administrative Tribunal of Apulia and Church of the Gesù
- Jesuit college in Verona (1578–1773 with interruption 1606–1656), now Municipal Library and Church of San Sebastiano, the latter destroyed during World War II
- Church of the Purgatory in Cerignola (1578–1767)
- Illyrian College in Loreto (1581–1593, 1624–1773, 1834–1860 and 1925–1942), now House of Pilgrims (Palazzo Illirico Casa accoglienza Pellegrini)
- Jesuit college in Piacenza (1583–1768), now Biblioteca Passerini-Landi and Church of San Pietro
- Professed house in Naples (1580s–1767), now Eleonora Pimentel Fonseca Lyceum and Church of the Gesù Nuovo
- Novitiate of Pizzofalcone in Naples (1588–1767), now Nunziatella Military School and Church of the Nunziatella
- Jesuit college in Bari (1589–1767), now Church of the Holy Name of Jesus
- Jesuit college at Palazzo Camponeschi in L'Aquila (1596–1773), now University of L'Aquila and Church of Santa Margherita
- Jesuit college in Modena (1602–1773), now Istituto Istruzione Superiore Adolfo Venturi and Church of San Bartolomeo
- Jesuit college in Ancona (1605–1773), now Church of the Gesù
- University of Fermo (1609–1773)
- Saint Ignatius College in Naples (1611–1767), now known as the Complesso del Carminiello al Mercato
- Jesuit college in Monopoli (1616–1767)
- Jesuit college in Gorizia (1615–1772), now Church of Saint Ignatius
- Church of Madonna della Piaggia in Spoleto (1621–1773)
- University of Mantua (1625–1630)
- Jesuit college in Trieste (1627–1773), now Church of Santa Maria Maggiore
- Church of Saint Francis Xavier in Naples (1636–1767), now Church of San Ferdinando
- Jesuit complex in Venice (1657–1773), now university housing (Residenza Universitaria Gesuiti) and Church of Santa Maria Assunta ("I Gesuiti")
- Second Jesuit college in Padua (1663–1773)
- Church of San Giuseppe a Chiaia in Naples (1666–1767)
- Jesuit boarding house for the nobility in Turin (1679–1773), now Museo Egizio
- Convitto Pontano alla Conocchia in Naples (18th century–1773, 1801–1806, 1827–1848, 1849–1860 and 1886–1922), initially as a facility of the Collegium Maximum and later as the first seat of Istituto Pontano; now abandoned
- Convent of Saint Stephen in Colorno near Parma (1799–1806)
- Church of San Domenico in Chioggia (since 1814)
- Jesuit college in Spoleto (1826–?)
- Villa Mondragone in Frascati (1865–1981)
- Villa San Girolamo in Fiesole, temporary seat of the General Curia of the Jesuit Order (1873–1895)
- Social Institute in Turin (since 1881)
- Istituto Pontano in Naples (since 1876), from 1886 in the Convitto Pontano alla Conocchia and since 1922 in the historic Palazzo Spinelli di Cariati
- Leo XIII Institute in Milan (since 1893)
- Pontificio Collegio Leoniano in Anagni (1897–1984)
- Aloisianum in Gallarate (since 1936)

==== Sardinia ====
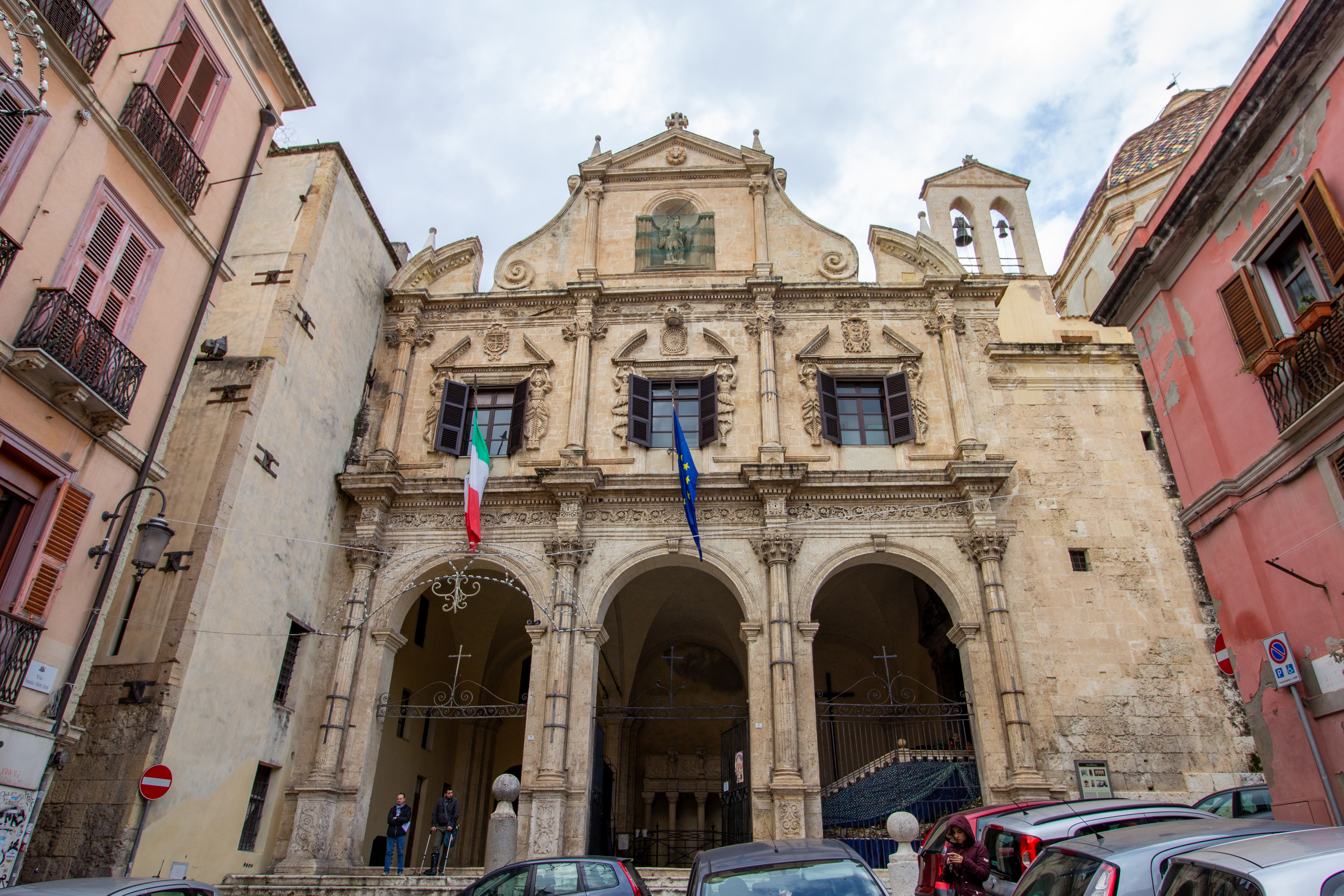
Novitiate at Cagliari

- University of Sassari (1558–1765)
- Jesuit college in Cagliari (1564–1773), now Faculty of Architecture of University of Cagliari
- Novitiate in Cagliari (1584–1773), now a military hospital and Church of Saint Michael

==== Sicily ====
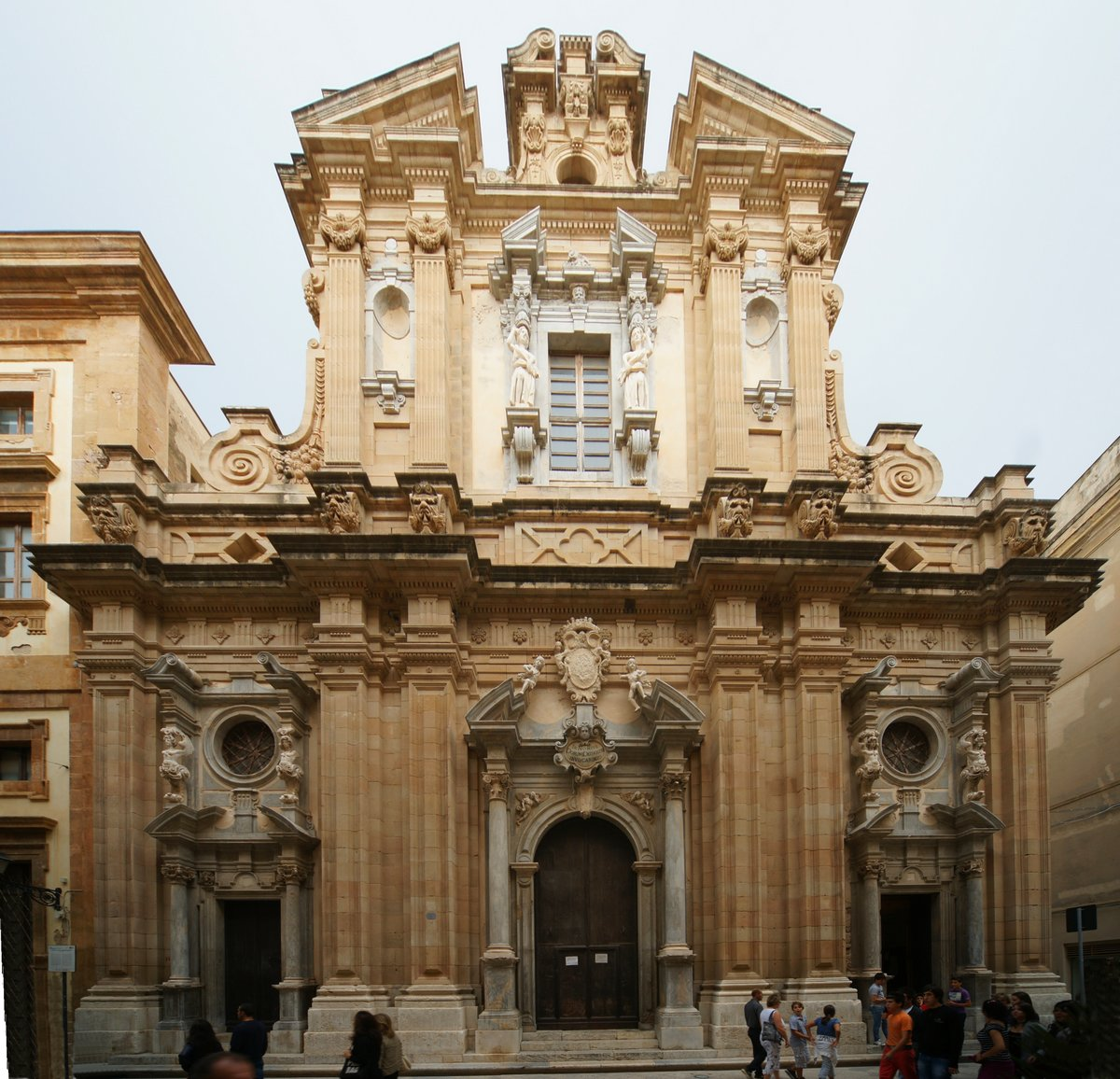
College church, Trapani

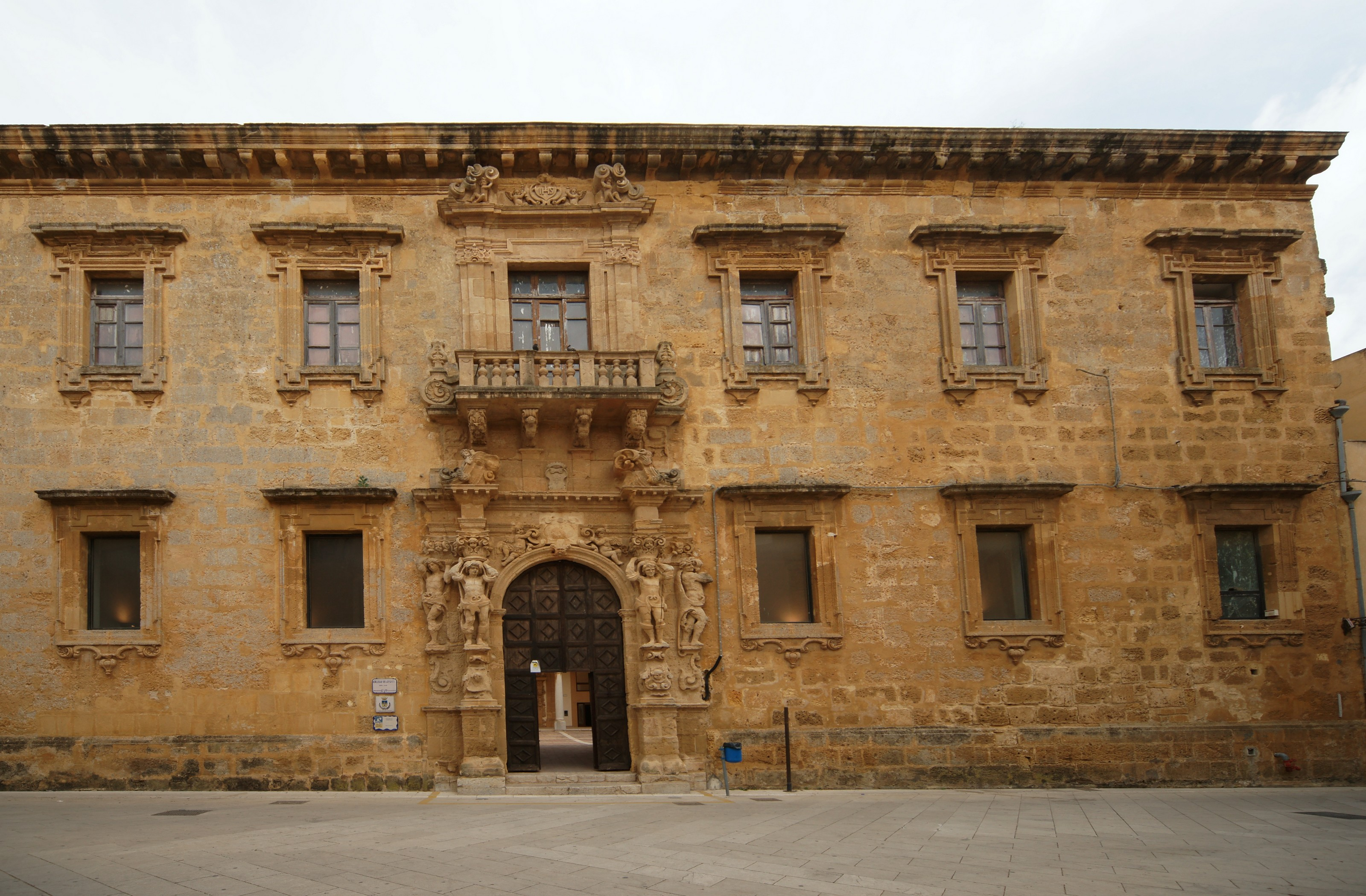
College at Mazara del Vallo

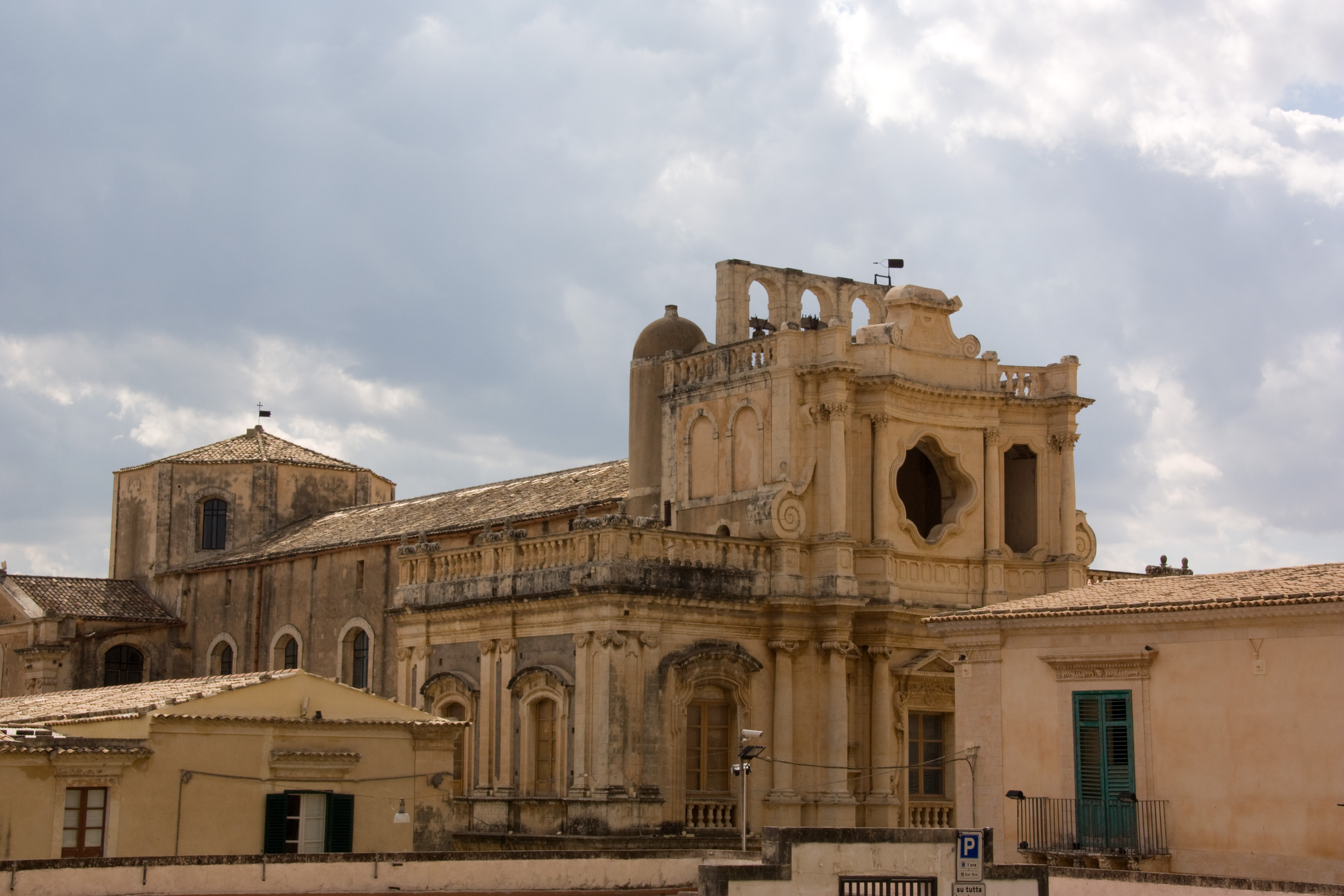
Seminary church, Noto

- Professed house in Messina (1547–1767) with the Church of San Nicolò dei Gentiluomini, destroyed in the 1908 Messina earthquake
- Jesuit College in Messina (1548–1767), generally considered the first Jesuit college, approved by Papal bull on 19 April 1550; destroyed in 1908 and replaced on the same ground by new facilities of the University of Messina
  - The college church's portal was rebuilt on the grounds of the Interdisciplinary Regional Museum of Messina
- Professed house in Palermo (1549–1767), now Biblioteca comunale di Casa Professa and Church of the Gesù
- Jesuit college in Catania (1555–1767), rebuilt 1698–1740 on the present site following the 1693 Sicily earthquake, now Art Institute (until 2009) and Church of San Francesco Borgia
- Jesuit college in Syracuse (1555–1767), now offices of the Guardia di Finanza and Italian Revenue Agency and Church of the Jesuit College
- Jesuit college in Bivona (1556–1767), now Town Hall and Church of Mater Salvatoris
- Jesuit college in Caltabellotta (1558–1767)
- Jesuit college in Trapani (1580–1767), now Liceo ginnasio statale Leonardo Ximenes and Church of the Jesuits
- Collegium Maximum (second Jesuit house) in Palermo (1586–1767), now Biblioteca centrale della Regione Siciliana, Giovanni Falcone Boarding School and Church of Santa Maria della Grotta al Cassaro
- Jesuit College in Caltanissetta (1588–1767), now Biblioteca Scarabelli, Vincenzo Bellini Musical School, and Church of Sant'Agata al Collegio
- Jesuit college in Mineo (1588–1767), now office of the municipality and Church of San Tommaso Apostolo
- Novitiate (third Jesuit house) in Palermo (1591–1767), now Church of San Stanislao Kostka
- Jesuit college in Modica (1630–1767), now Liceo classico Tommaso Campailla and Church of Santa Maria del Soccorso
- Fourth Jesuit house in Palermo (1633–1767), now buildings of University of Palermo (mostly rebuilt following World War II destructions) and Church of Saint Francis Xavier
- Jesuit college in Alcamo (1652–1773), now Museum of Contemporary Art, Church of the Holy Family and Church of the Gesù
- Jesuit College in Mazara del Vallo (1672–1767), now a cultural center
- Fifth Jesuit house or Casa di Sant'Ignazio al Molo in Palermo (1715–1767), now a school
- Jesuit college in Noto (1730–1767), now an arts venue and Church of San Carlo al Corso
- St. Ignatius College in Messina (since 1884)
- Gonzaga Institute in Palermo (since 1919)

=== Kosovo ===
- Loyola Gymnasium in Prizren (since 2005)

=== Latvia ===
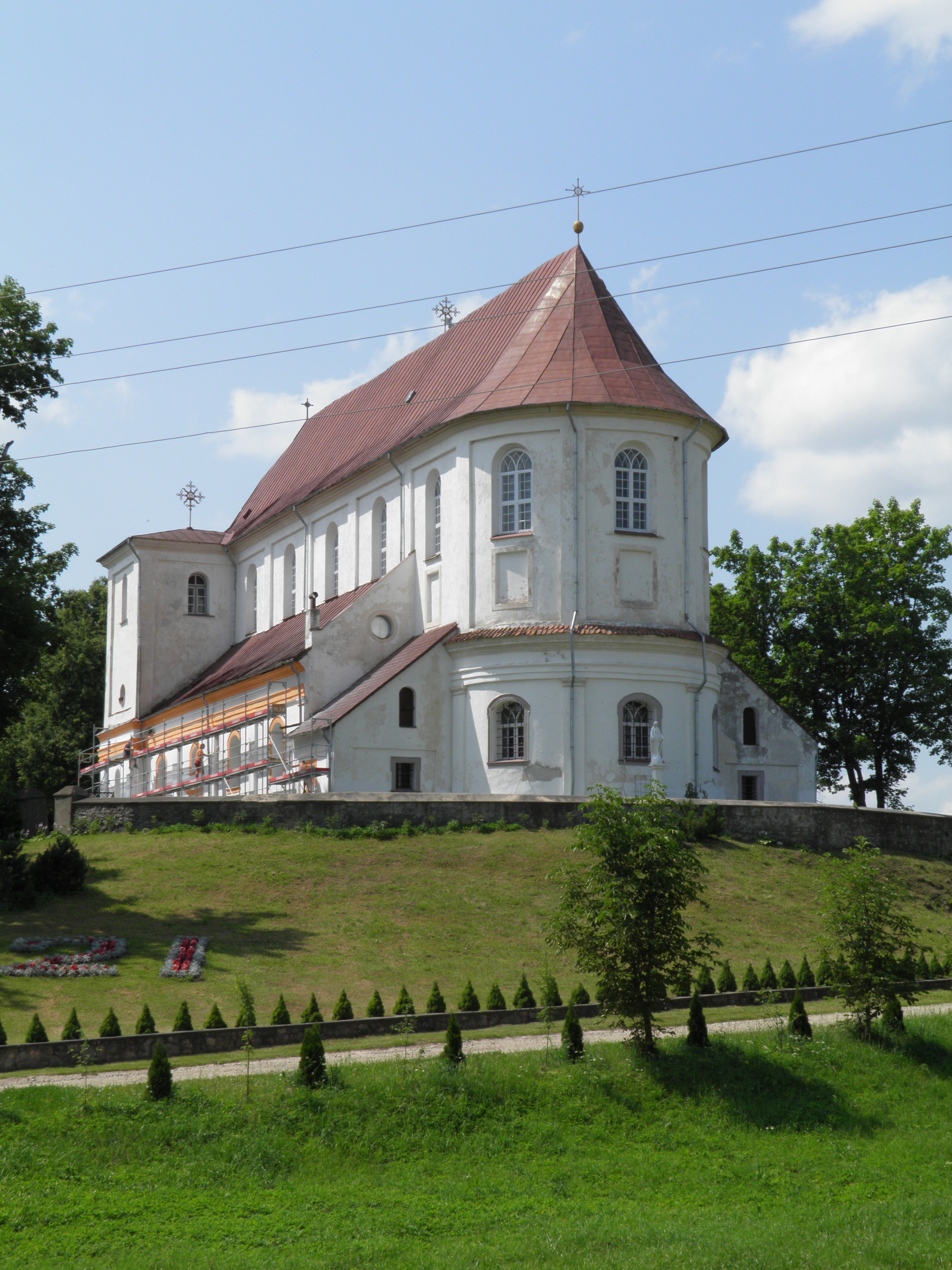
Residence church in Skaistkalne

- Jesuit college in Riga (1582–1621)
- St. James's Cathedral in Riga (1582–1621)
- Jesuit college in Cēsis (1582–1625), initially a residence until 1614
- Jesuit college in Daugavpils (1630–1811, with interruption 1656–1669), initially a residence until 1761, now Daugavpils fortress; college church destroyed during World War II
- Jesuit school in Izvalta (1635–1820), from 1817 a college, now Izvalta Church
- Jesuit residence in Skaistkalne (1660–1773), initially a mission until 1677, now Church of the Assumption
- Jesuit college in Krāslava (1676–1811)
- Jesuit residence in Jelgava (1690–1773)
- Jesuit college in Ilūkste (1690–1773), initially a residence until 1761, destroyed during World War I
- Jesuit college in Dagda (1742–1820)
- Jesuit college in Puša, Rēzekne Municipality (1743–1820 and since 2006), now Puša Catholic Church
- Jesuit residence in Riga (1804–1820)

=== Lithuania ===
Vilnius college courtyard

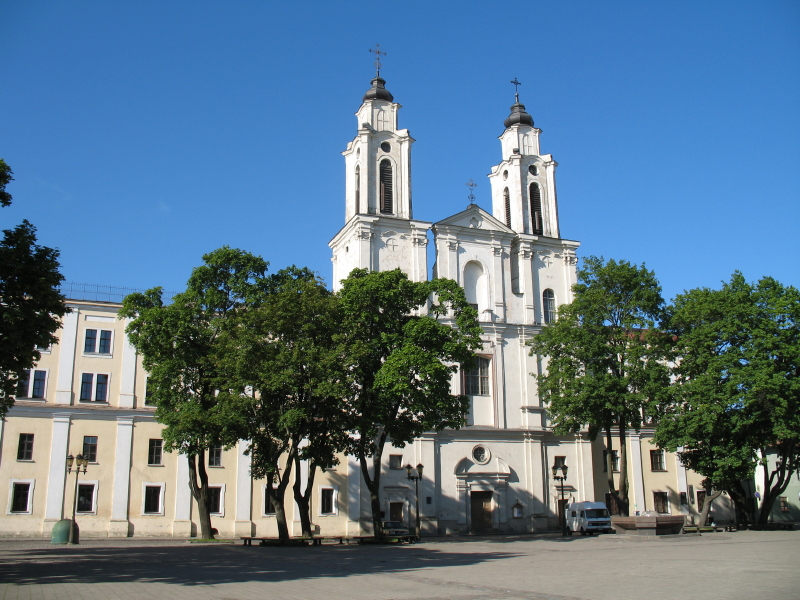
Kaunas college church

- Jesuit college in Vilnius (1570–1773), now Vilnius University, including the Astronomical Observatory started in 1753, and Church of Saint John
- Professed house in Vilnius (1604–1773, 1921–1939 and since 1995), now Vilnius Jesuit High School and Church of Saint Casimir
- Jesuit college in Kražiai (1616–1773), now a tourism office and elderly care center
- Jesuit novitiate in Vilnius (1622–1773), now Latvian Technical Library and Basilica of Saint Ignatius
- Chapel of the House of Perkūnas in Kaunas (1643–1773)
- Jesuit college in Kaunas (1649–1820, 1923–1940 and since 1989), now Jesuit Gymnasium and Church of Saint Francis Xavier
- Jesuit college in Pašiaušė (1654–1773) named after Antonio Possevino (Collegium Possaviensis), now a ruined chapel
- Jesuit residence in Merkinė (1676–1773), now Merkinė Catholic Church
- Jesuit mission in Šeduva (1696–1762)
- Jesuit tertianship house in Vilnius (1697–1773), now offices of the Lithuanian Ministry of Culture's Heritage Department and Church of Saint Raphael Archangel

=== Luxembourg ===
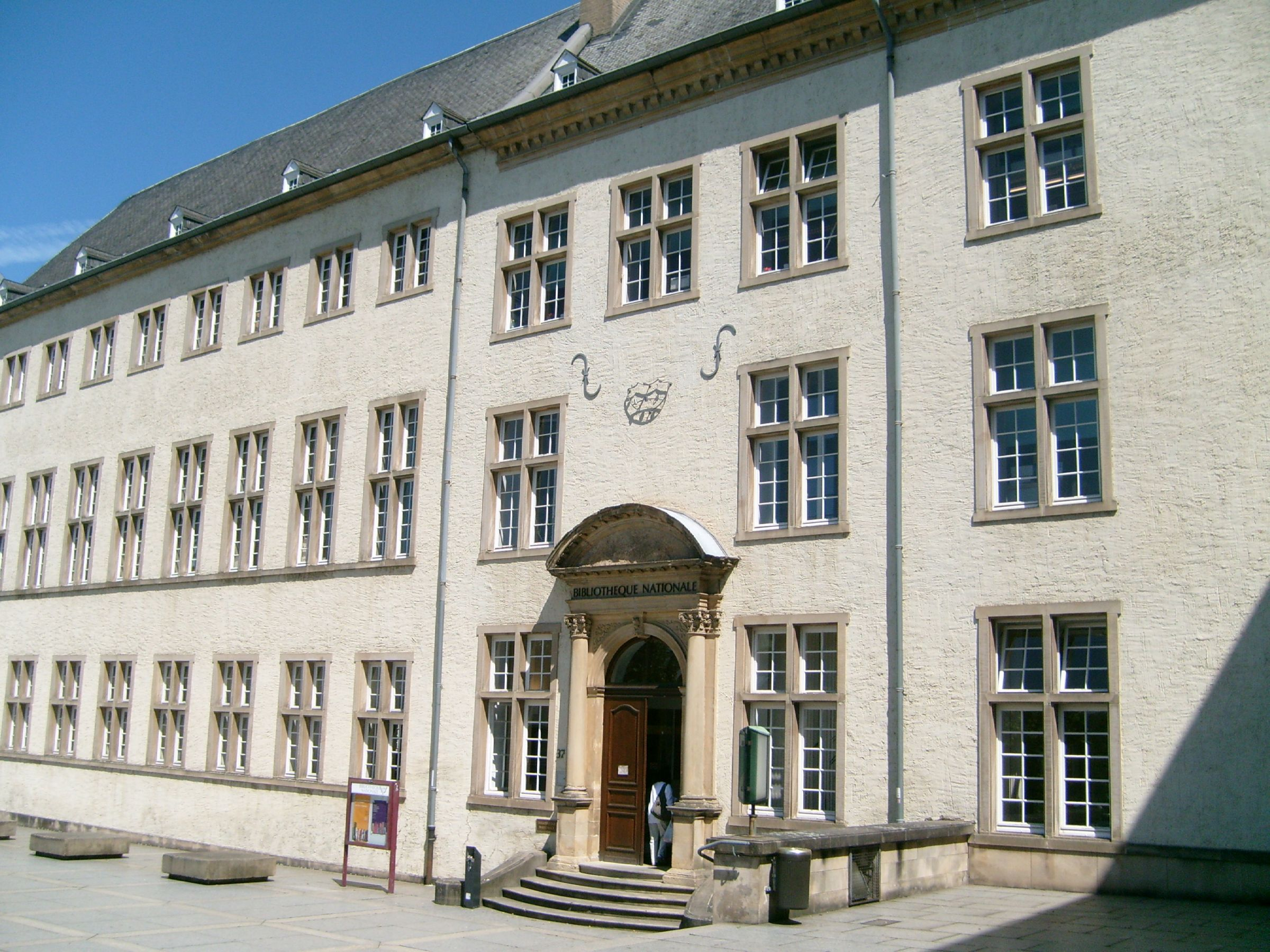
College in Luxembourg

- Jesuit college in Luxembourg City (1603–1773), now National Library of Luxembourg and Notre-Dame Cathedral; precursor to Athénée de Luxembourg high school

=== Malta ===
- Collegium Melitense in Valletta (1592–1768), now Valletta Campus of University of Malta and Church of the Jesuits
- Jesuit seminary in Gozo (1866–1909)
- Jesuit college in Villa St Ignatius in St. Julian's (1877–1906)
- St Aloysius' College in Birkirkara (since 1907)

=== Monaco ===
- Jesuit college in the former Convent of the Visitation (1862–1910), now Lycée Albert Premier
- Church of the Sacred Heart (1926–1965), now a parish church

=== Netherlands ===
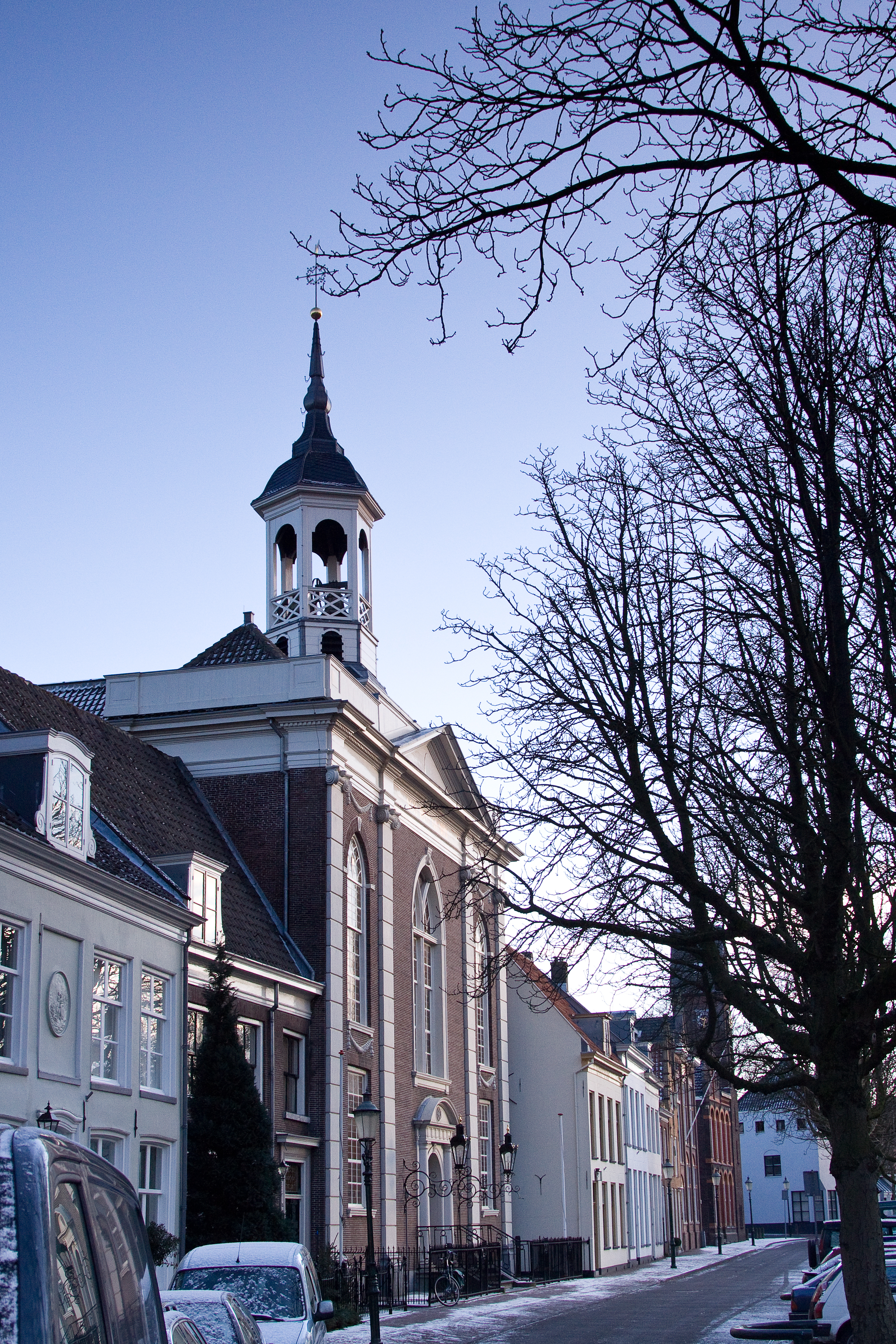
Church in Amersfoort

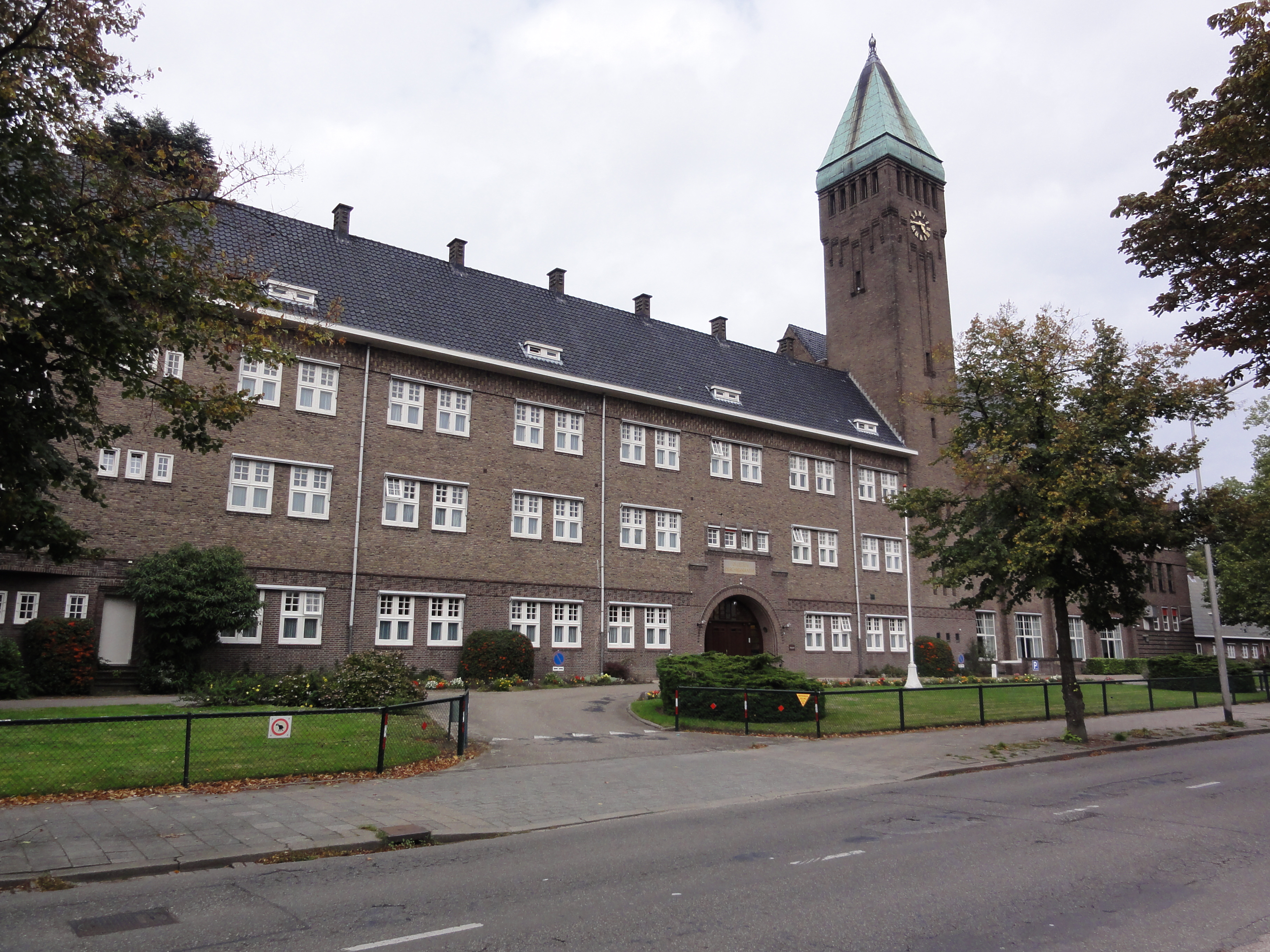
Berchmanianum, Nijmegen

- Jesuit college in Maastricht (1575–1773, interrupted 1578–1579 and 1639–1673), now Jezuïetenhofje complex and Bonbonnière theater in the former college church
- Church of Saint Francis Xavier in Amersfoort (since 1630), until 1715 a clandestine church
- De Krijtberg church in Amsterdam (since 1654, rebuilt 1881–1883), initially a clandestine church
- Church of Saint Peter Canisius in Nijmegen (since 1818)
- St. Willibrord College in Leiden (1831–1927), now Bonaventure College
- Catholic Comprehensive School in Breul near Zeist (1842–1980s), now known as De Breul
- Canisianum Monastery in Maastricht (1853–1967), now School of Economics of Maastricht University
- Jesuit novitiate in Bleijenbeek Castle (1872–1900), in ruins since World War II
- Jesuit college / seminary at Exaten in Leudal near Baexem (1872–1927), now a center for asylum seekers
- Juniorate for German Jesuits at Wijnandsrade Castle in Wijnandsrade (1872–1910)
- Jesuit retreat center at Villa Aalbeek in Aalbeek, Beekdaelen (since 1879)
- Jezuïetenberg quarries near Maastricht (1880–1967)
- Church of the Fathers in Groningen (1886–1962)
- Jesuit monastery in Valkenburg (1893–1940)
- Ignatius Gymnasium in Amsterdam (1895–1960s)
- Canisius College in Nijmegen (1900–2005)
- St Francis Xavier Church in Enkhuizen (since 1905), built on the site of a former clandestine church
- Huize Manresa retreat center in Venlo (1908–1973), demolished around 2003
- Aloysius College in The Hague (1917–1970s)
- Retraitehuis Schinnen retreat center in Beekdaelen (1923–1969), now a center for asylum seekers
- Berchmanianum college and residence in Nijmegen (1928–2016)
- Maartenscollege in Groningen (1946–1992)
- Saint Stanislas College in Delft (since 1948), with Chapel of Saint Stanislas built 1955
- Guldenberg retreat center in Helvoirt (1965–1970s), now a conference hotel
- Ignatiushuis spirituality and cultural centre (since 1985), relocated in 2000 next to De Krijtberg

=== Poland ===
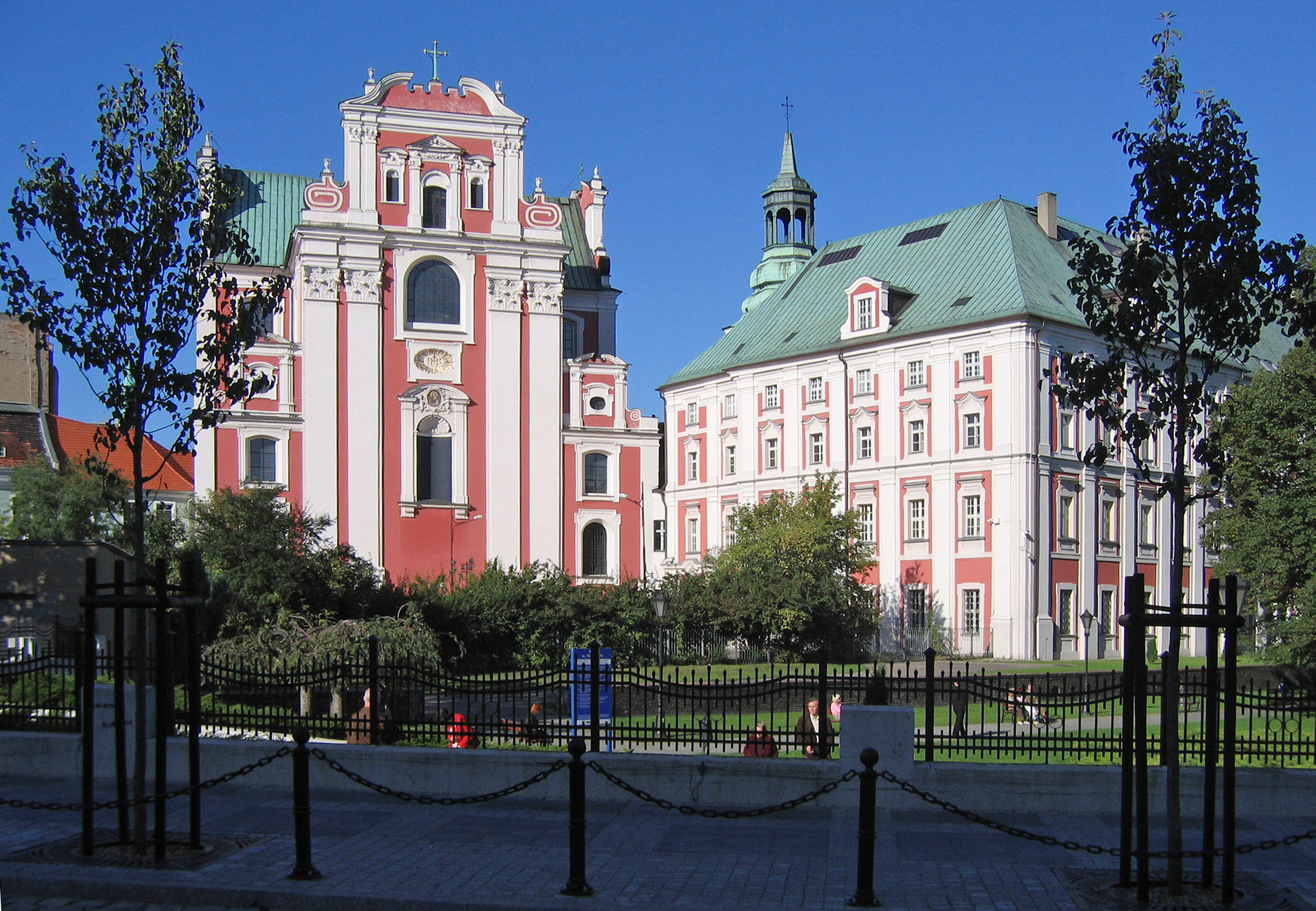
College in Poznań

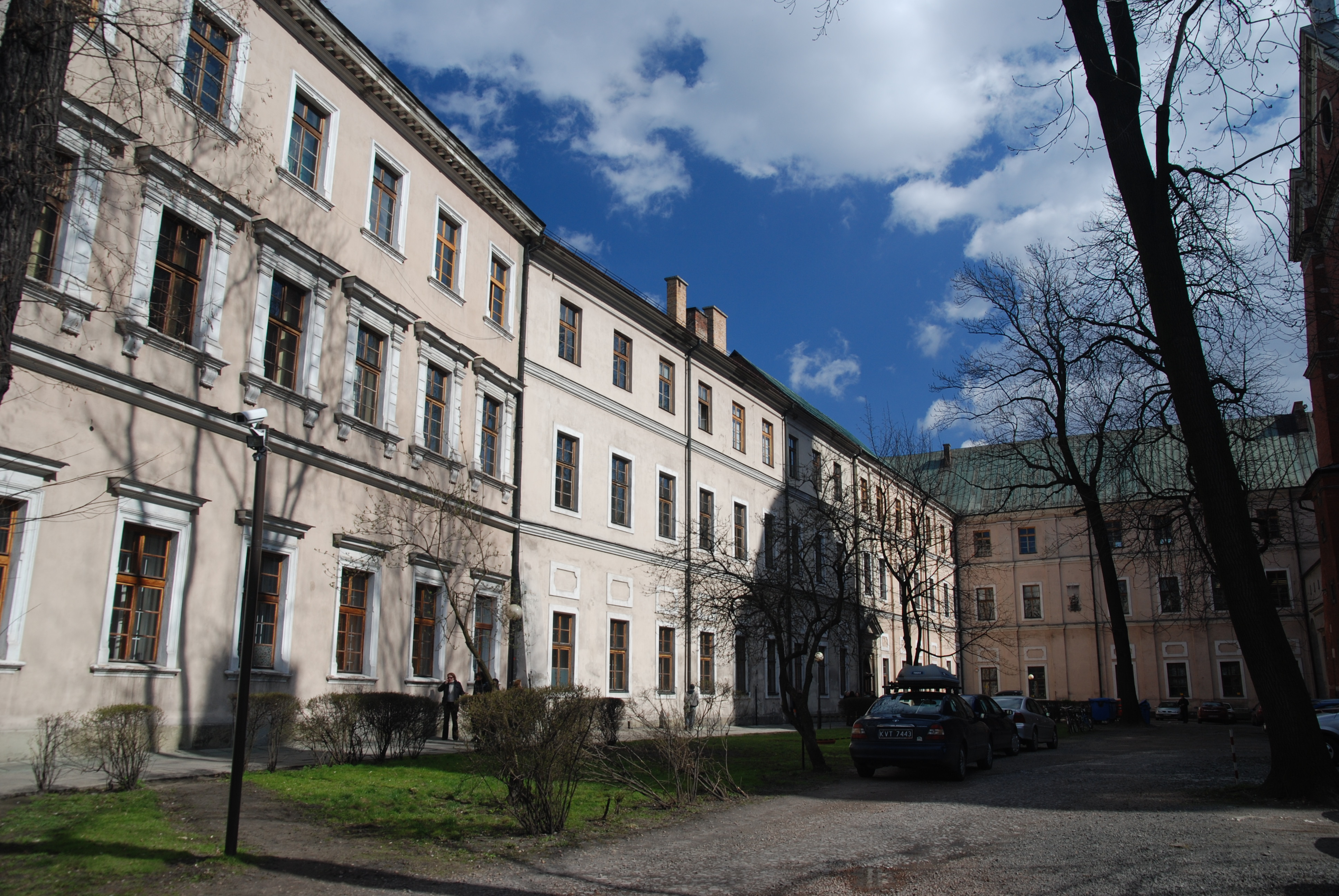
Collegium Broscianum in Kraków

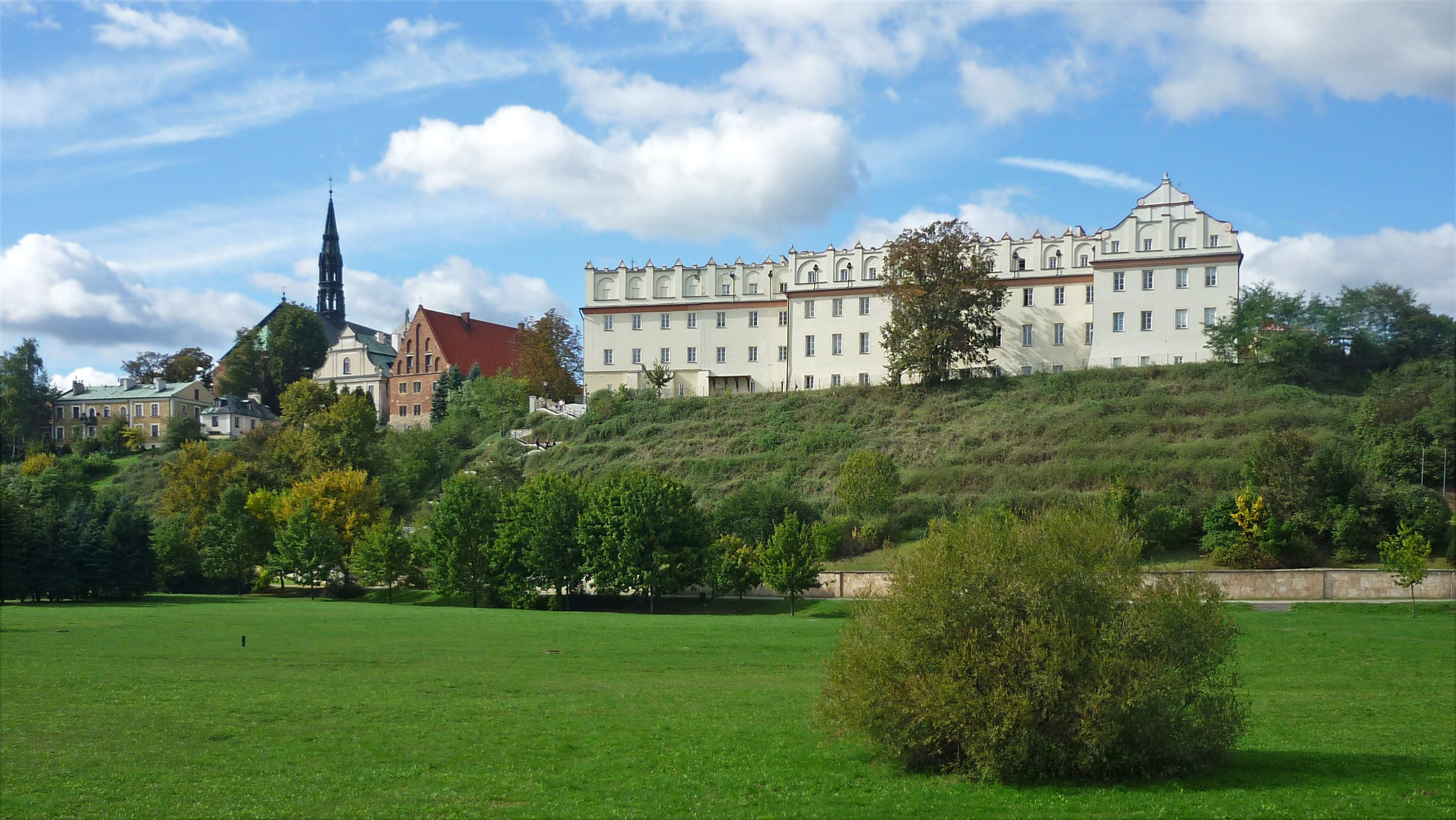
College in Sandomierz

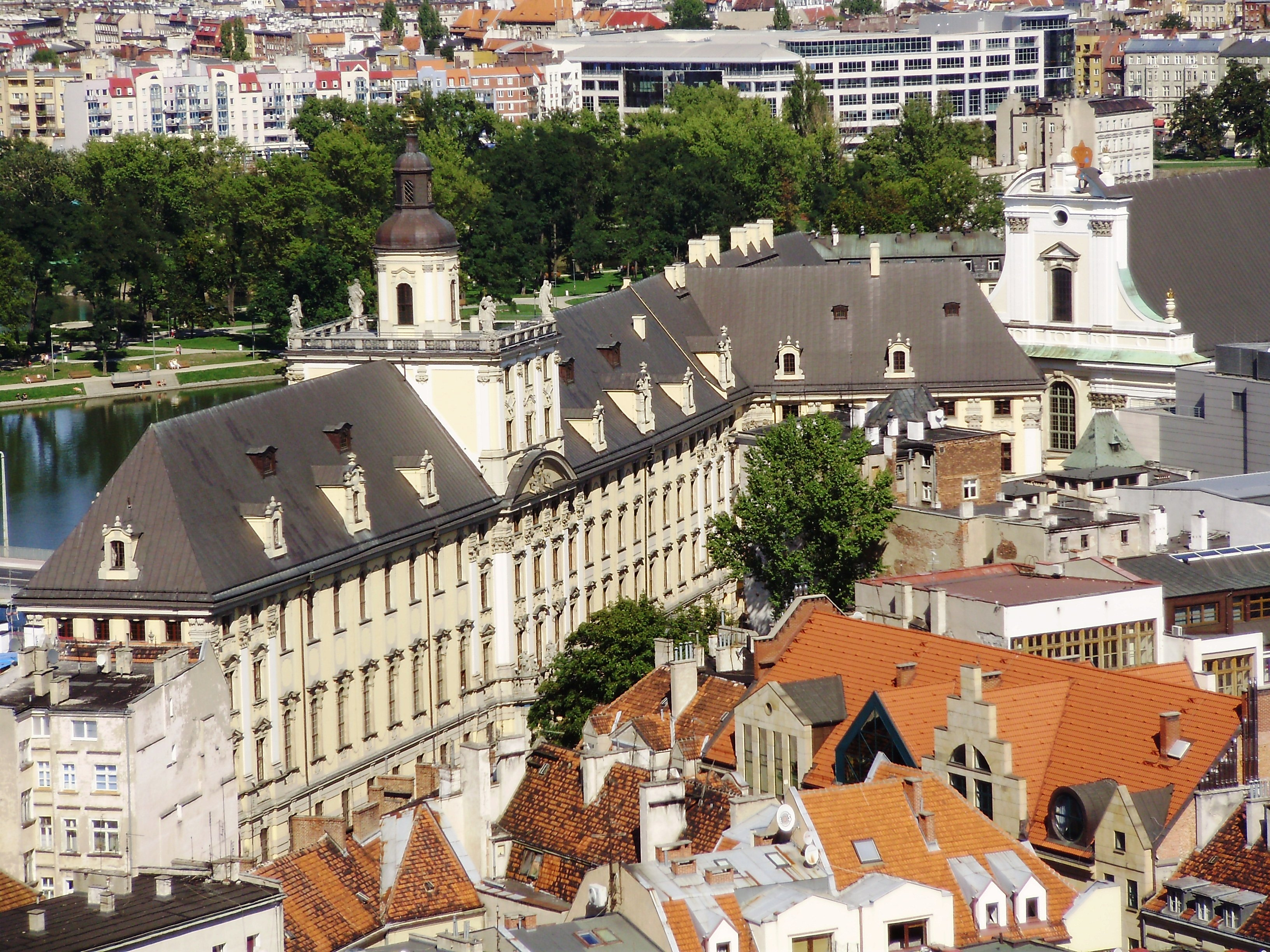
University of Wrocław

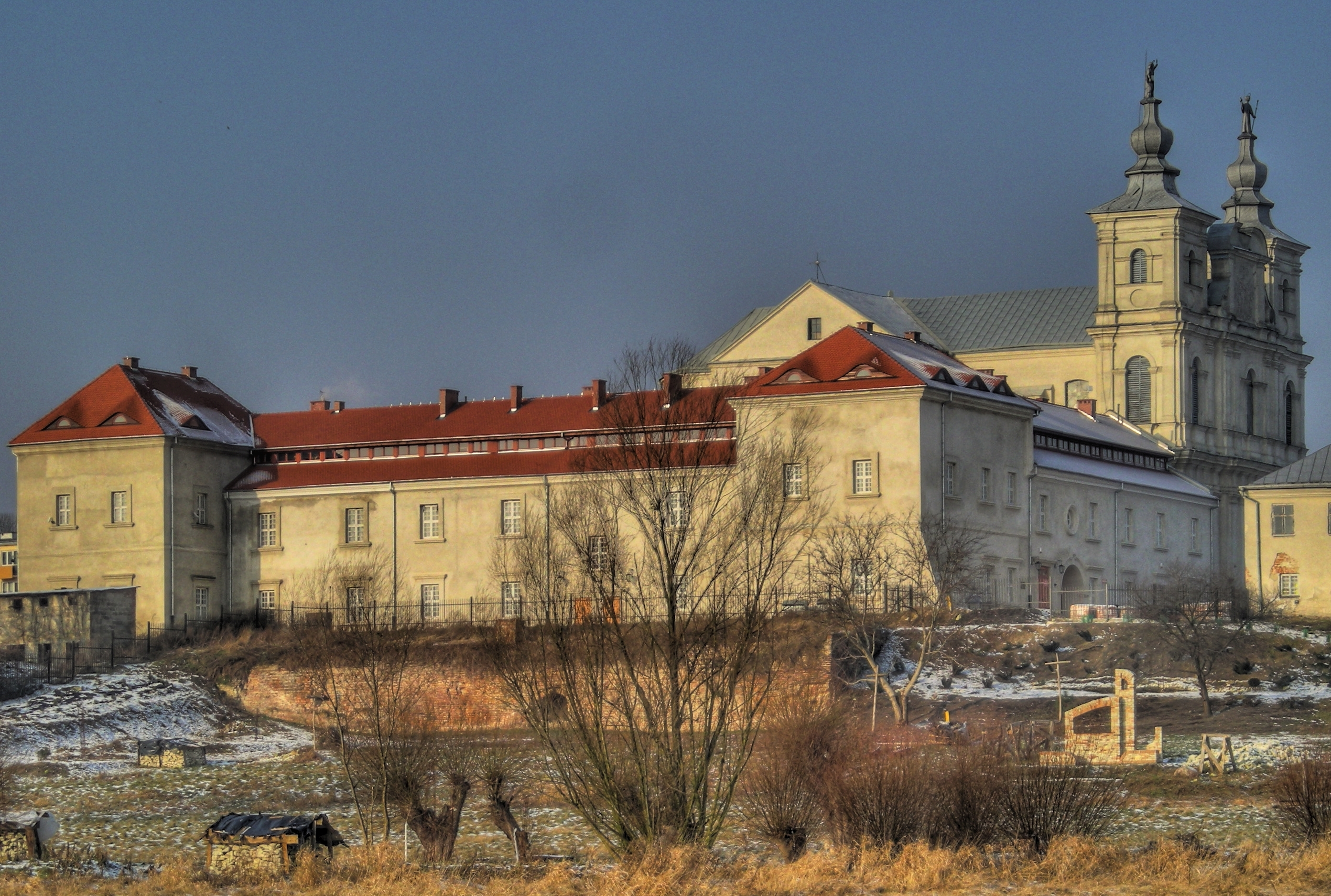
College in Krasnystaw

- Collegium Hosianum in Braniewo (1565–1773, with interruptions 1626–1637 and 1665–1668), now Jan Liszewski vocational school and Regional Museum
- Jesuit college in Pułtusk (1566–1773), now Piotr Skarga High School and Church of Saints Peter and Paul
- Jesuit College in Poznań (1572–1773), now City Hall and Basilica of Our Lady of Perpetual Help, Mary Magdalene and St. Stanislaus known as Fara Poznańska; precursor to Adam Mickiewicz University
  - In the 1570s the college also took over the medieval Mary Magdalena School and Collegiate Church of St. Mary Magdalene in Poznań
  - The college housed two locally renowned institutions: the Jesuit theater and, from the 1670s, the Jesuit printing house
- Jesuit college in Jarosław (1575–1773), now Stanisław Wyspiański School of Fine Arts and Corpus Christi Collegiate Church
- Jesuit college in Lublin (1582–1773), now Archdiocesan Museum (including the Trinitarian Tower) and Cathedral of Saint John the Baptist
- Professed house in Kraków (1583–1773 and since 1908), now Jesuit Provincial Curia and Church of Saint Barbara
- Church of Saint Stephen in Kraków (1579–1732), demolished in 1802
- Jesuit college in Kalisz (1583–1773), now government offices and Church of Saints Adalbert and Stanislaus
- Jesuit college in Kłodzko, Silesia (1597–1776), now Bolesław Chrobry Lyceum and Collegiate Church of the Assumption of the Virgin Mary
- Jesuit residence and college in Kraków (1597–1773), now Collegium Broscianum of Jagiellonian University and Church of Saints Peter and Paul, burial place of Piotr Skarga
- Jesuit college in Sandomierz (1602–1773), now Collegium Gostomianum secondary school
- Jesuit college in Toruń (1605–1773, with interruptions 1606–1607, 1656–1659 and 1703–1709), now Medical and Social Center
- Chapel of Malbork Castle (1607–1773)
- Jesuit Church in Warsaw (1609–1773 and since 1917)
- Jesuit college in Płock (1611–1773), now Marshal Stanisław Małachowski High School; in 1732 the Jesuits annexed the nearby Collegiate Church of Saint Michael
- Jesuit college in Krosno (1614–1783), demolished in the early 19th century
- Jesuit college in Bydgoszcz (1617–1780), now Bydgoszcz City Hall; college church demolished by German occupation forces in early 1940
- Jesuit college of the Old Scots District in Gdańsk (1621–1773), now Church of Saint Ignatius
- Jesuit college in Nysa, Silesia (1622–1773), now Church of the Assumption
- Jesuit college in Przemyśl (1626–1773), now a kindergarten and Cathedral of Saint John the Baptist; precursor to isJuliusz Słowacki Lyceum
- Former Augustinian monastery in Reszel (1631–1773)
- Jesuit school in Wrocław, Silesia (1638–1810), from 1702 a university, now University of Wrocław and its Museum (including the Aula Leopoldina, Oratorium Marianum and mathematical tower) and Church of the Holy Name of Jesus, the latter again under Jesuit stewardship from 1947 to 1995
- Jesuit college in Drohiczyn (1657–1773), now a Major Seminary, seat of the diocese and Cathedral of the Holy Trinity
- Święta Lipka Sanctuary in Święta Lipka (1688-late 18th century and since 1932)
- Jesuit mission in Żuromin (1718–1773)
- Jesuit college in Krasnystaw (1720–1780), now Regional Museum and Church of Saint Francis Xavier
- Jesuit residence in Wschowa (1727–1773)
- Monastery of the Holy Spirit in Nowy Sącz (since 1831)
- Jesuit College at the Sacred Heart Basilica in Kraków (since 1867), now Jesuit University of Philosophy and Education Ignatianum and Basilica of the Sacred Heart of Jesus
- St. Stanislaus Jesuit High School in Gdynia (1937–1948 and since 1994)
- Church of Saint Andrea Boboli in Szczecin (since 1945)
- Jesuit residence in Gdańsk (since 1945)
- Church of Saint Bartholomew in Gdańsk (1945–1990)
- Pedro Arrupe Training Center for Leaders and Educators in Warsaw (since 1997)

=== Portugal ===
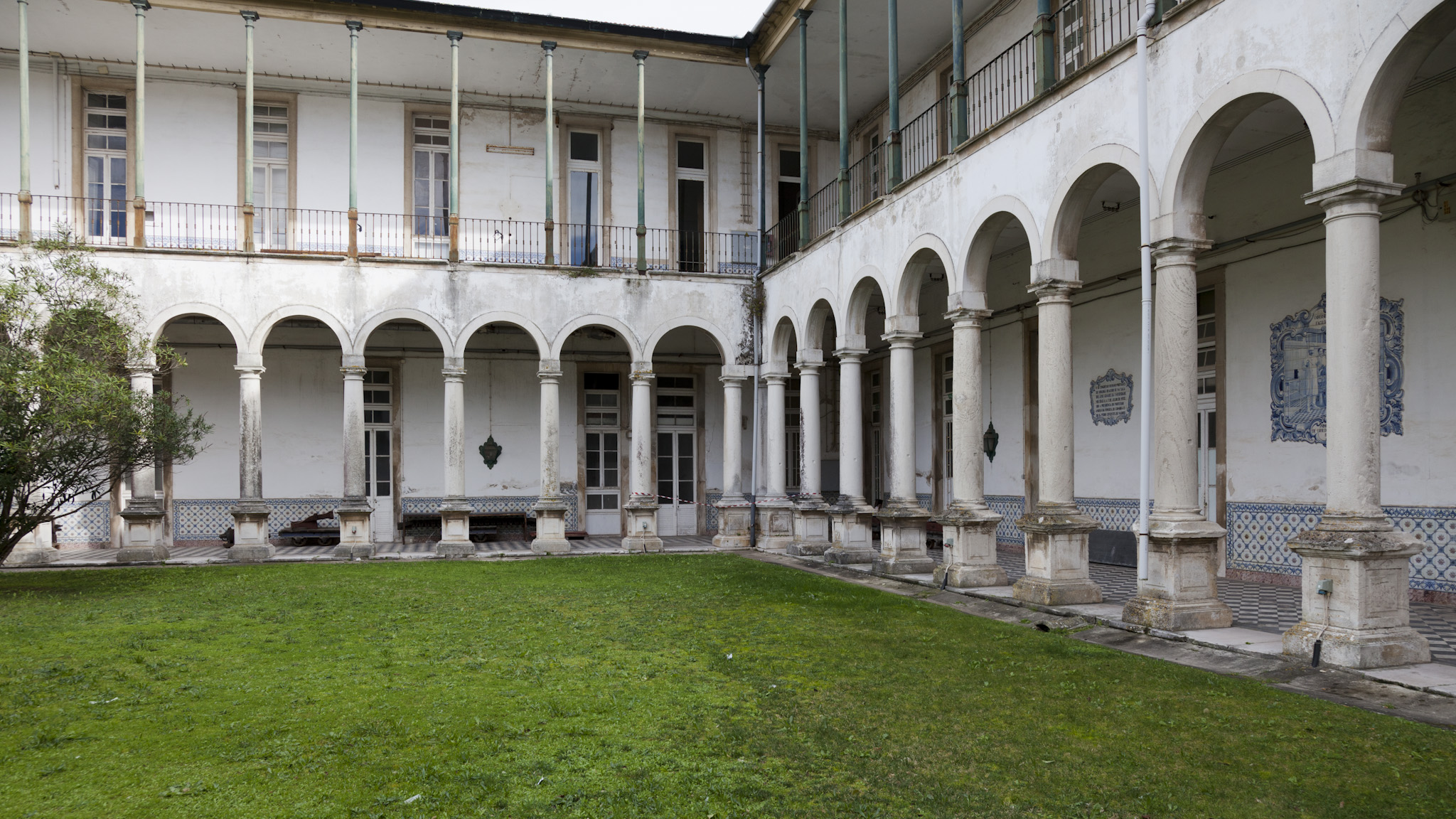
College of arts, Coimbra

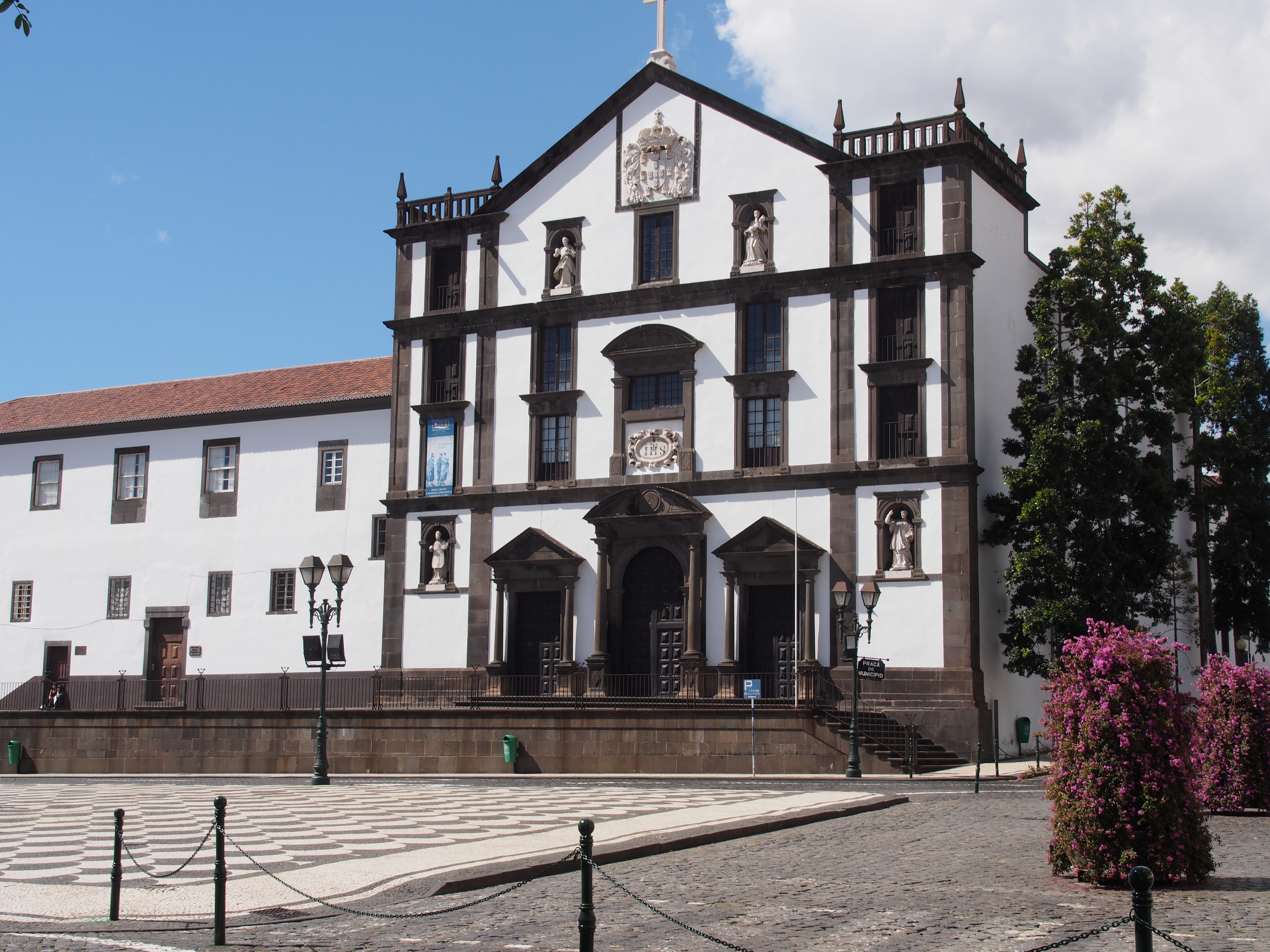
College church, Funchal

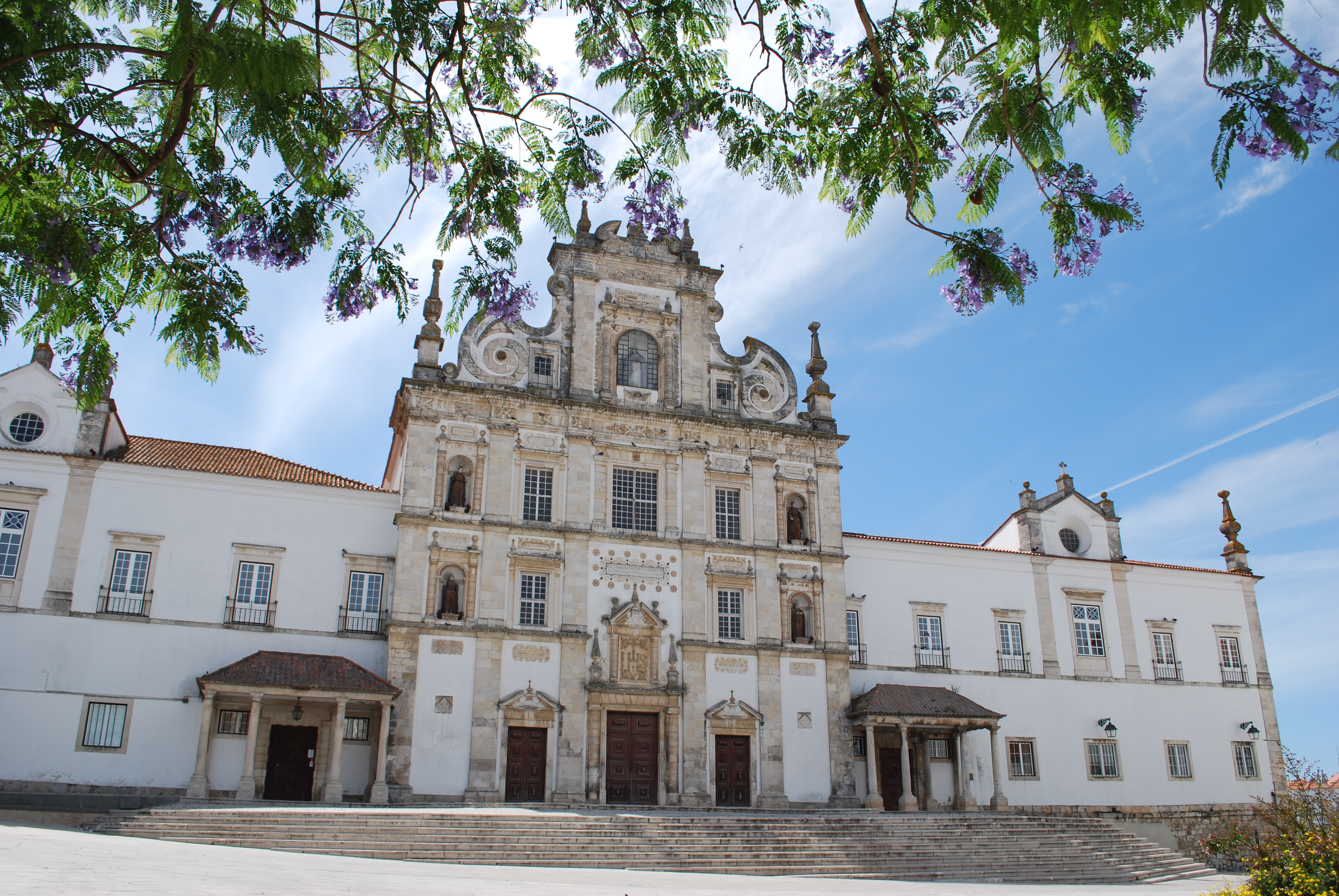
College church, Santarém

- College of Jesus in Coimbra (1542–1759), now departments of Earth Sciences and Life Sciences of University of Coimbra and New Cathedral of Coimbra
- College of Saint Anthony in Lisbon (1553–1759), now Hospital de São José
- Professed house in Lisbon (1553–1759 and 1829–1833), now the Santa Casa da Misericórdia, Museu de São Roque and Church of São Roque
- College of Arts in Coimbra (1555–1759), adjacent to the Jesuit college, now Colégio das Artes of University of Coimbra
- Jesuit college of the Holy Spirit in Évora (1559–1759 and 1829–1833), now part of University of Évora, Major Seminary and Church of the Holy Spirit
- Jesuit college in Bragança (1561–1759), now Adrian Moreira municipal cultural center, music and dance school and Old Cathedral
- Jesuit college in Ponta Delgada, Azores (1568–1759), now Public Library, Regional Archive and Church of the Jesuit College
- Jesuit college in Porto (1577–1759), now Major Seminary of Saint Lawrence and Igreja dos Grilos
- Jesuit college in Braga (1589–1759), now Seminário Conciliar de São Pedro e São Paulo, Pius XII Museum, Medina Museum and Church of Saint Paul
- Jesuit college in Funchal, Madeira (1599–1759), now rectorate of the University of Madeira and Church of Saint John the Evangelist
- Jesuit college in Angra do Heroísmo, Azores (1636–1759), now Palace of the Captains-General and Church of Our Lady of Carmen
- Jesuit college in Santarém (1647–1759), now Episcopal Palace, seminary and Cathedral of Our Lady of the Assumption
- Jesuit College of Campolide in Lisbon (1858–1910), now NOVA University Lisbon
- Colégio de São Fiel near Castelo Branco (1863–1910), buildings destroyed by fire in 2017
- Regional Centre of the Catholic University of Portugal in Braga (since 1947)
- St. John de Britto College in Lisbon (since 1947)
- Leigos para o Desenvolvimento in Lisbon (since 1986)

=== Romania ===
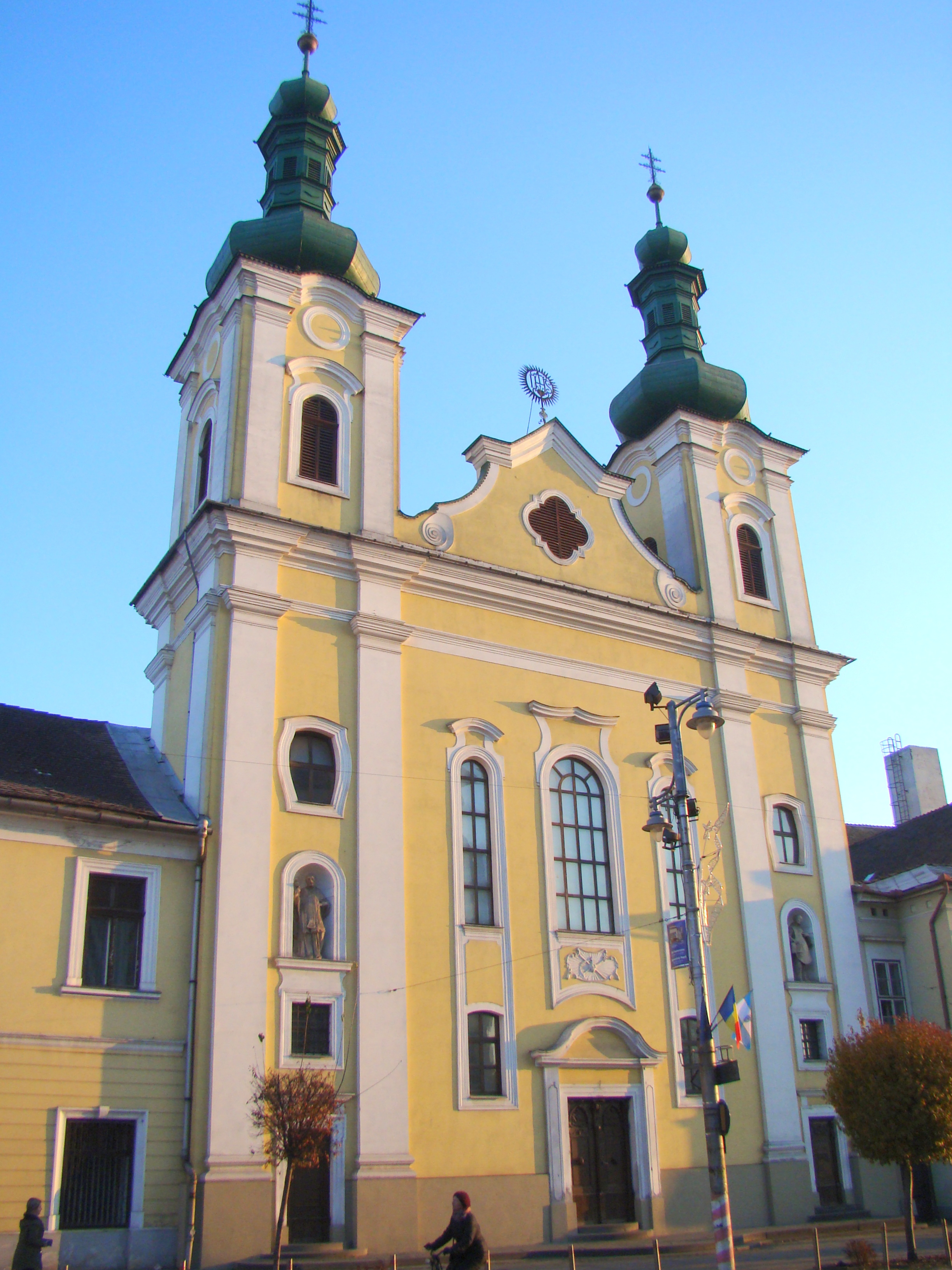
College church, Târgu Mureș

- Jesuit college in Oradea (1579–1606)
- Jesuit college in the Alba Carolina Citadel of Alba Iulia (1579–1588 and 1715–1776), now 1 Decembrie 1918 University
- Jesuit Academy of Kolozsvár in Cluj-Napoca (1581–1603 and 1698–1773), now Babeș-Bolyai University and Church of the Piarists; precursor to University of Szeged in Hungary
- Jesuit mission in Timișoara under Ottoman rule (1632–1653), later a mosque
- Jesuit college in Satu Mare (1634–1773), now Mihai Eminescu National College
- Jesuit college in Sibiu (1692–1773), now Jesuit Church; precursor to Gheorghe Lazăr National College
- Jesuit college in Târgu Mureș (1702–1773), now Church of Saint John the Baptist
- Jesuit college in Baia Mare (1717–1719), now Church of the Holy Trinity

=== Russia ===
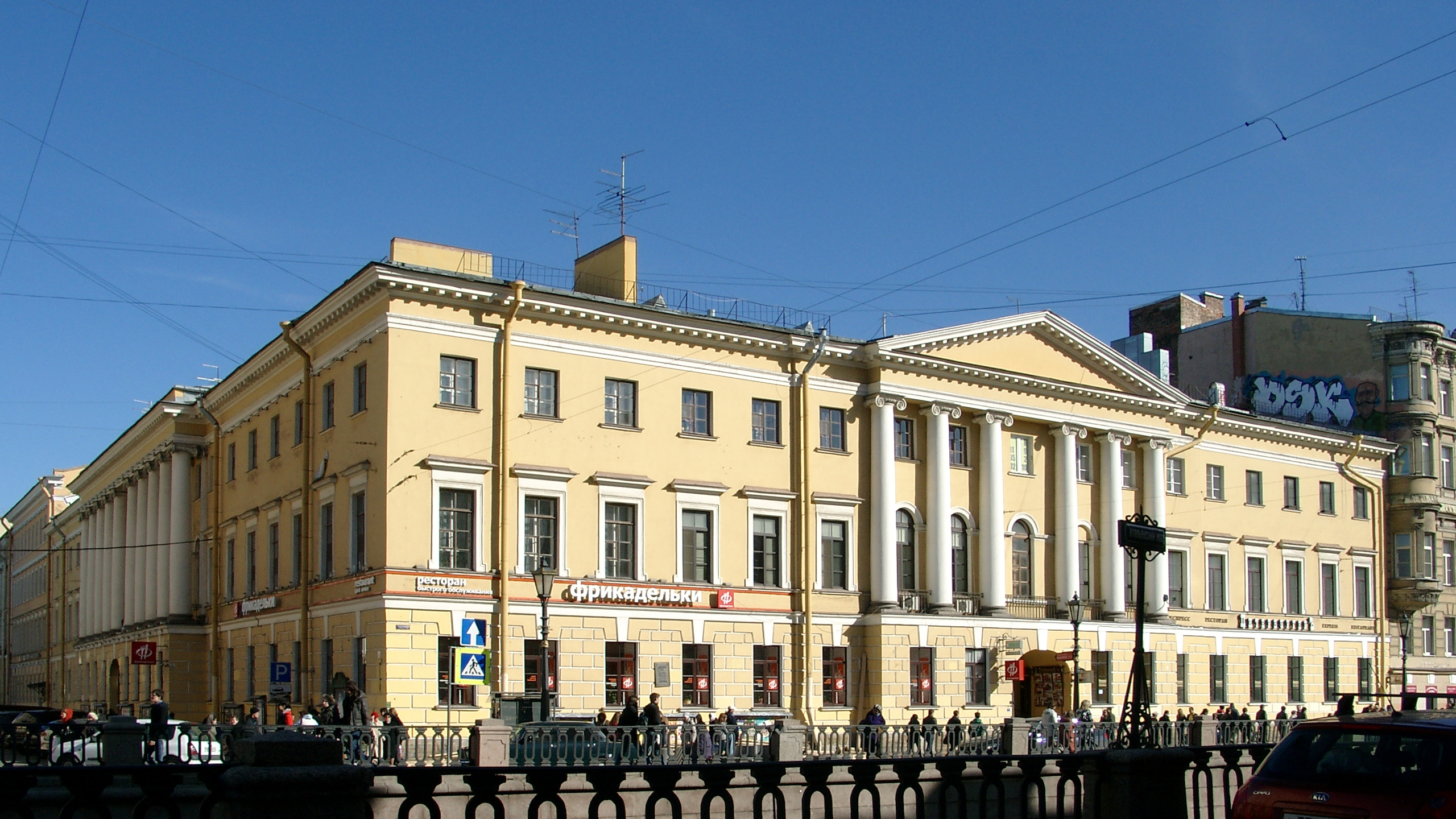
College in Saint Petersburg

- Jesuit college in Smolensk (mid-17th century)
- Jesuit school in Moscow (1687–1689 and 1698–1719)
- Church of Saint Catherine in Saint Petersburg (1800–1815)
- Jesuit college in Saint Petersburg (1801–1815), now Museum of Emotions
- Jesuit missions in Saratov (1803–1820), Astrakhan (1805–1820), Mozdok (1806–1820), Irkutsk (1811–1820) and Tomsk (1815–1820)
- Saint Thomas Institute in Moscow (since 1997)

=== Serbia ===
- Jesuit mission in Belgrade under Ottoman rule (1612–1632)
- Church of Saint George in Petrovaradin (1701–1773)

=== Slovakia ===
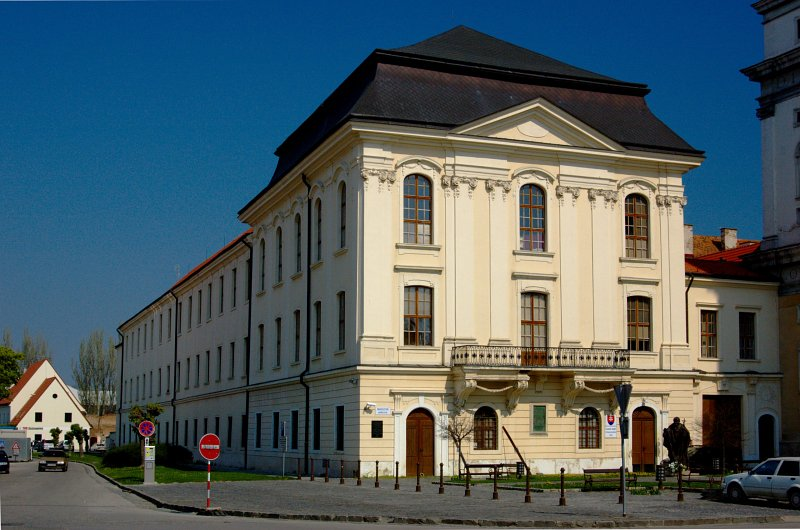
University in Trnava

- First Jesuit college in Trnava (1561–1567)
- Jesuit college in Šaľa (1586–1773)
- Jesuit college in Kláštor pod Znievom (1589–1773, with interruption 1599–1609)
- Jesuit college in Bratislava (1628–1773) on the north side of St Martin's Cathedral, now faculty of theology of Comenius University
- Jesuit university in Trnava (1635–1773), now University of Trnava and Cathedral of Saint John the Baptist; precursor to Eötvös Loránd University in Budapest
- Monastery of Skalka nad Váhom (1644–1773)
- Jesuit college in Banská Bystrica (1647–1773), now Cathedral of Saint Francis Xavier
- Jesuit college in Žilina, now Church of the Conversion of Saint Paul (1654–1773)
- Church of the Holy Trinity in Košice (1671–1773)
- Jesuit Church in Bratislava (1672–1773 and since 1989)
- Church of Saint Francis Xavier in Skalica (1693–1773)

=== Slovenia ===
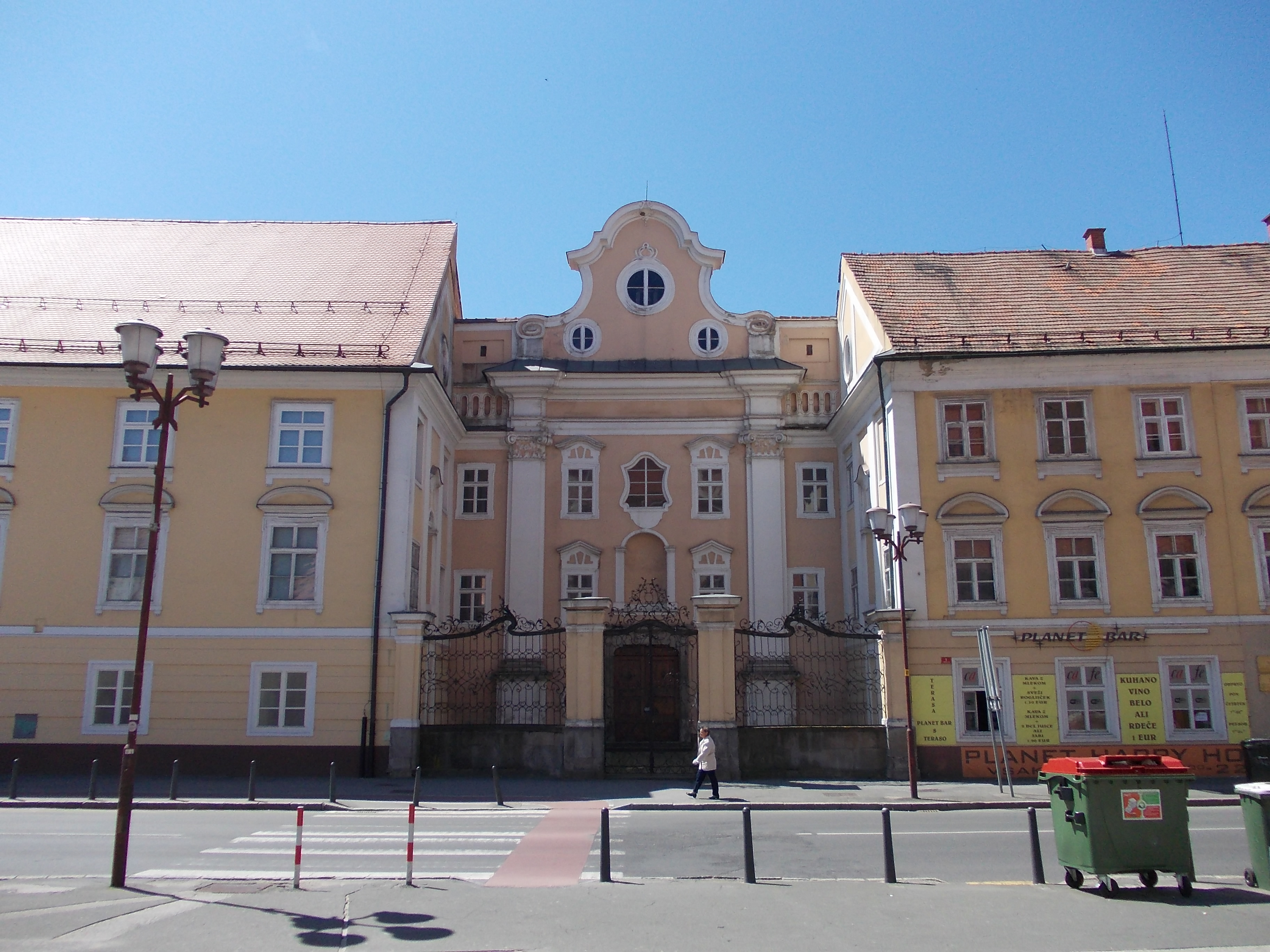
College church, Maribor

- Former Pleterje Charterhouse near Šentjernej (1591–1773)
- Former charterhouse in Jurklošter (1595–1773)
- Jesuit college in Ljubljana (1597–1773), now Special Education Centre Janez Levec and Parish Church of Saint James
- Ptuj Castle (1642–1656)
- Jesuit college in Maribor (1757–1773), now regional and Archdiocesan archives and Church of Saint Aloysius Gonzaga

=== Spain ===
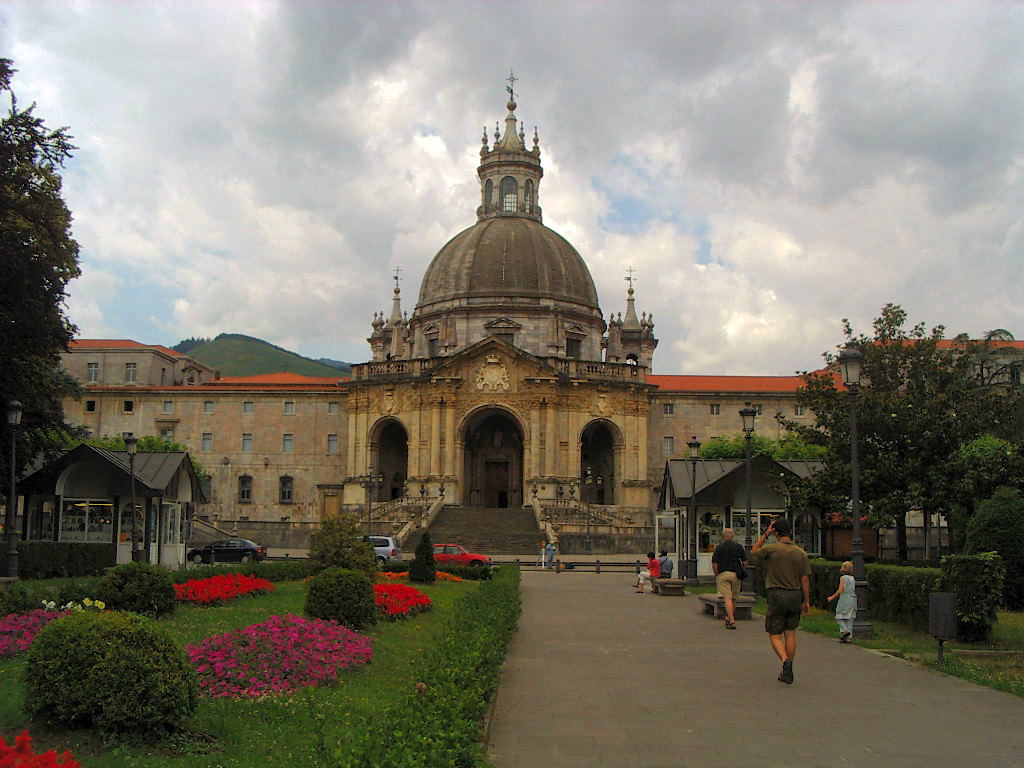
Sanctuary of Loyola

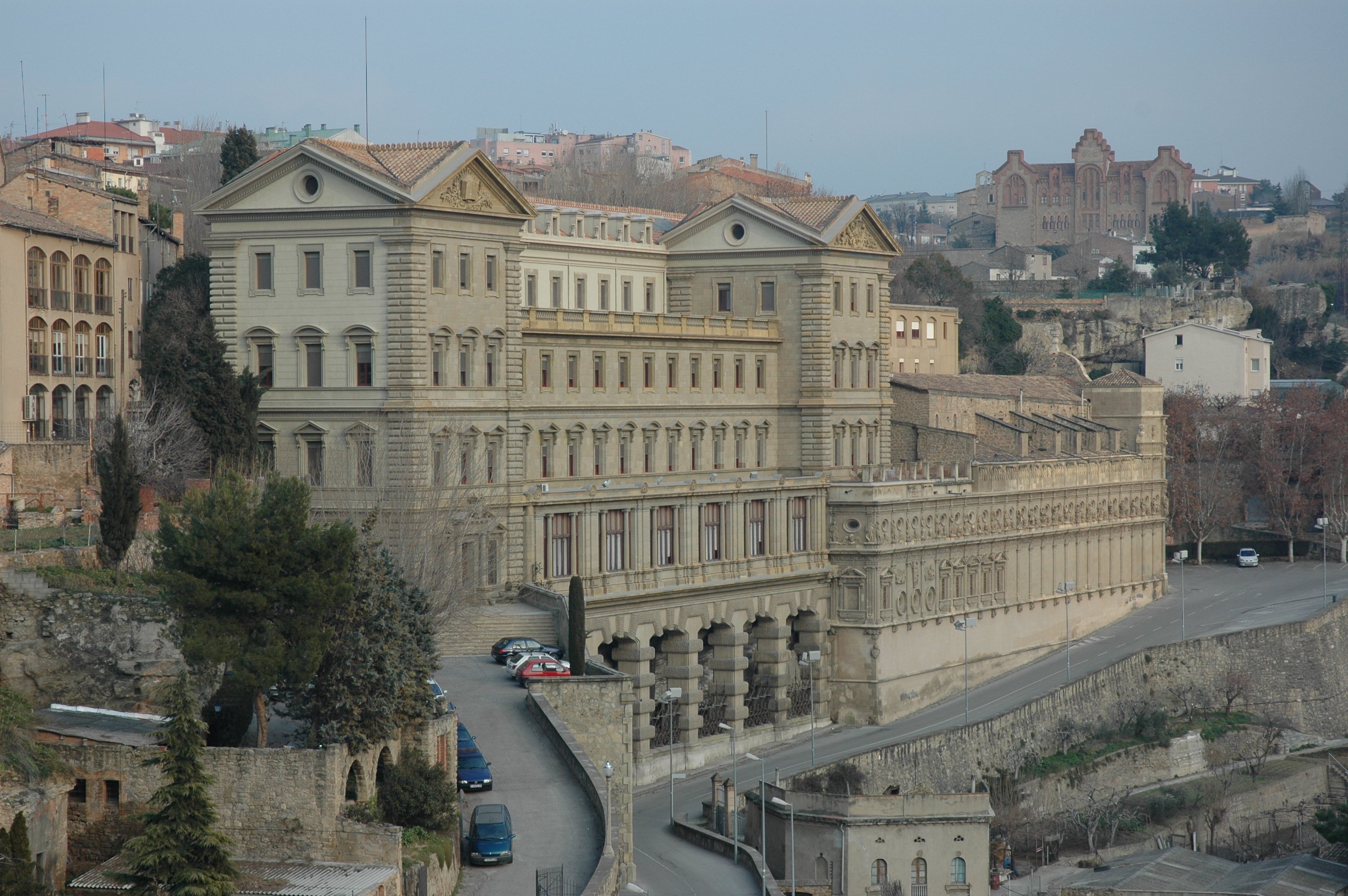
Cave of St Ignatius, Manresa

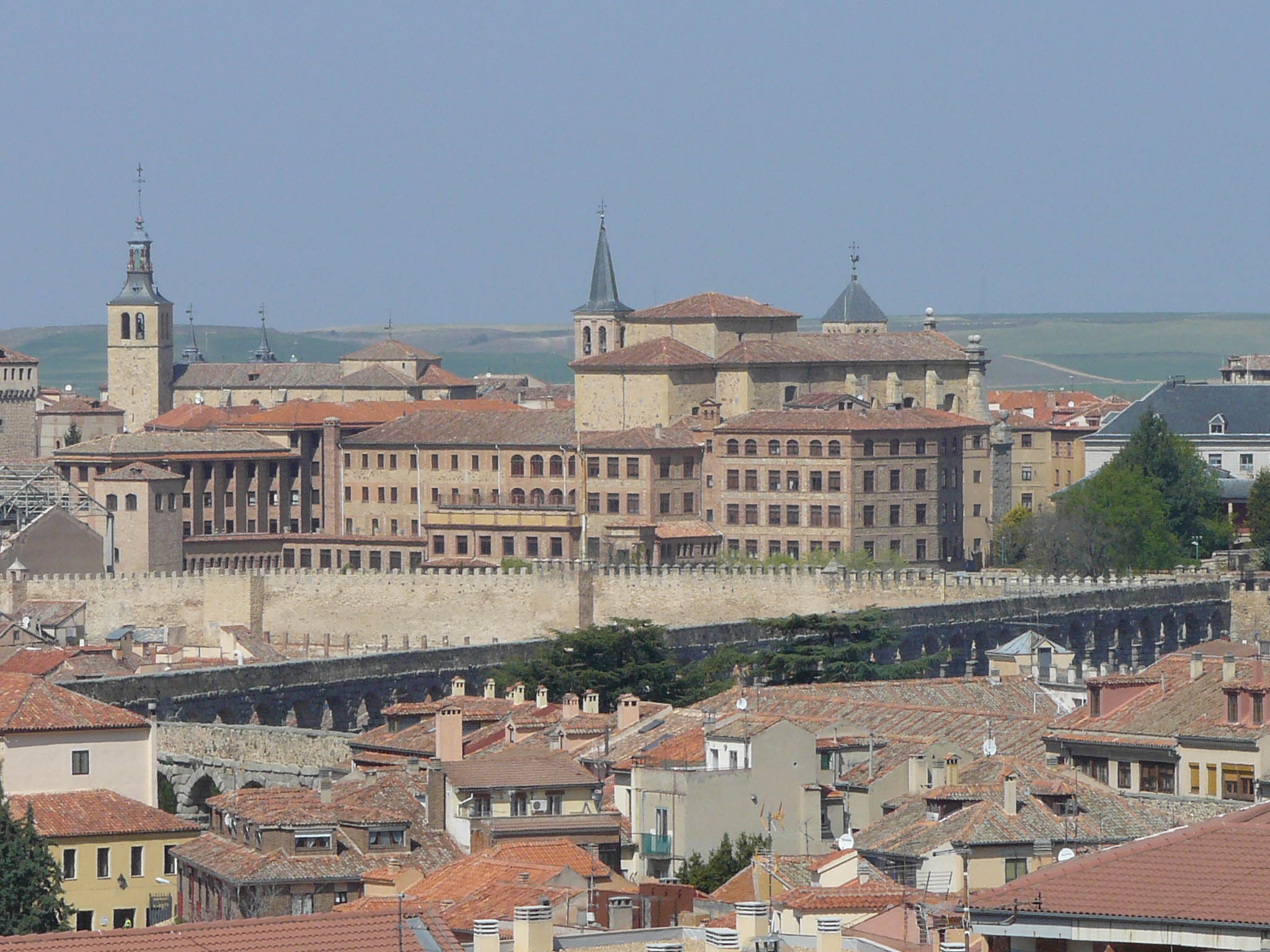
College in Segovia

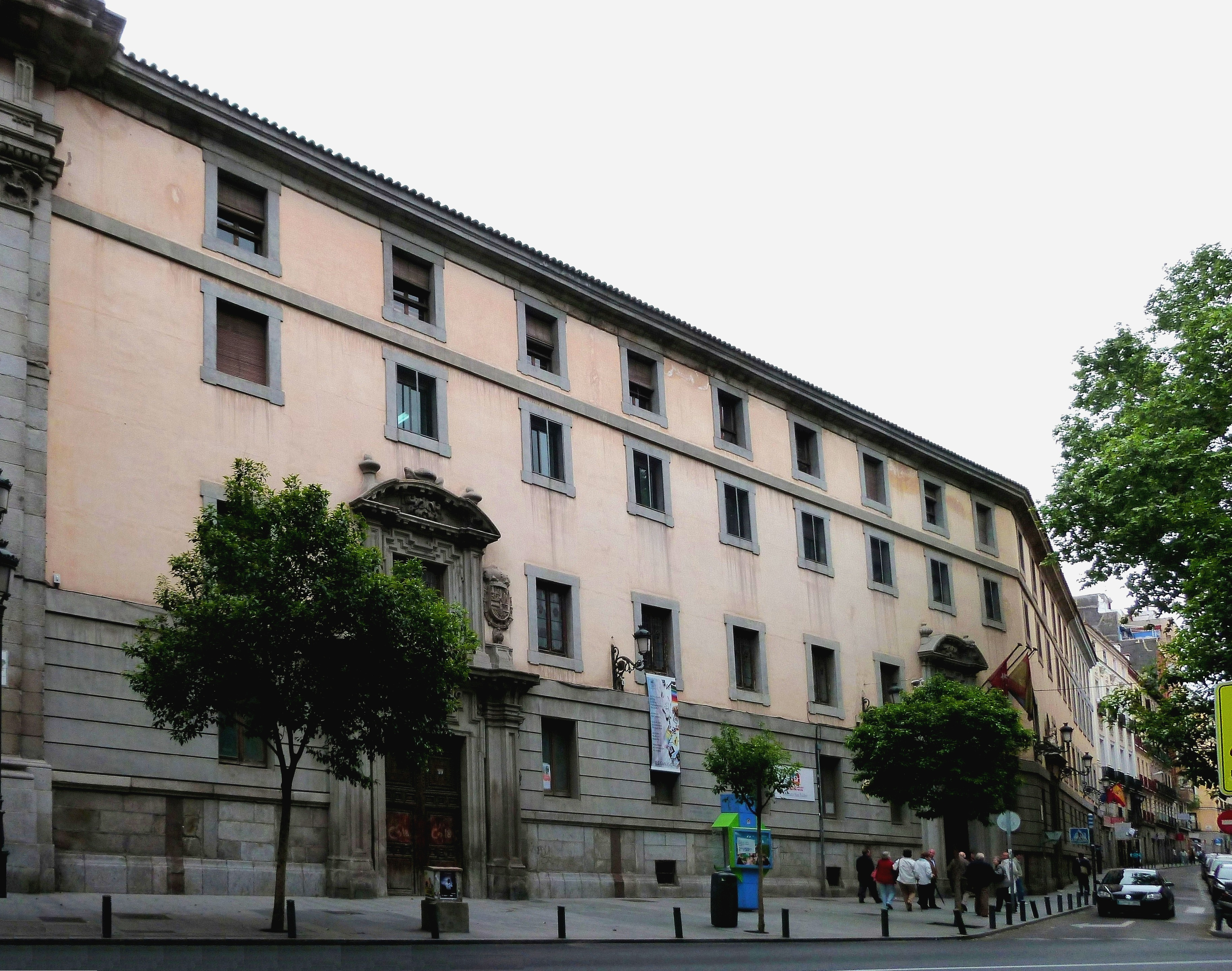
College in Madrid

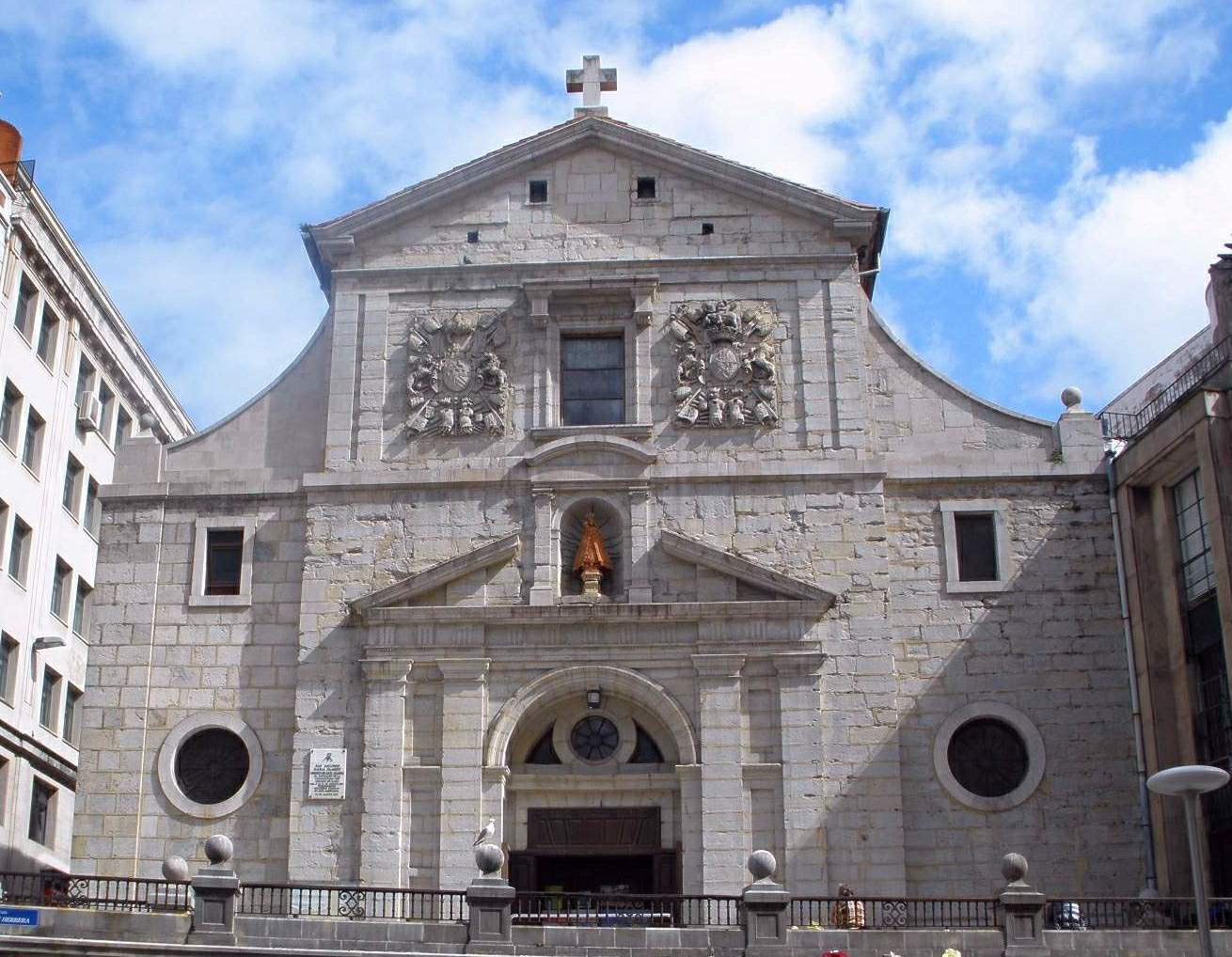
College church, Santander

English college, Valladolid

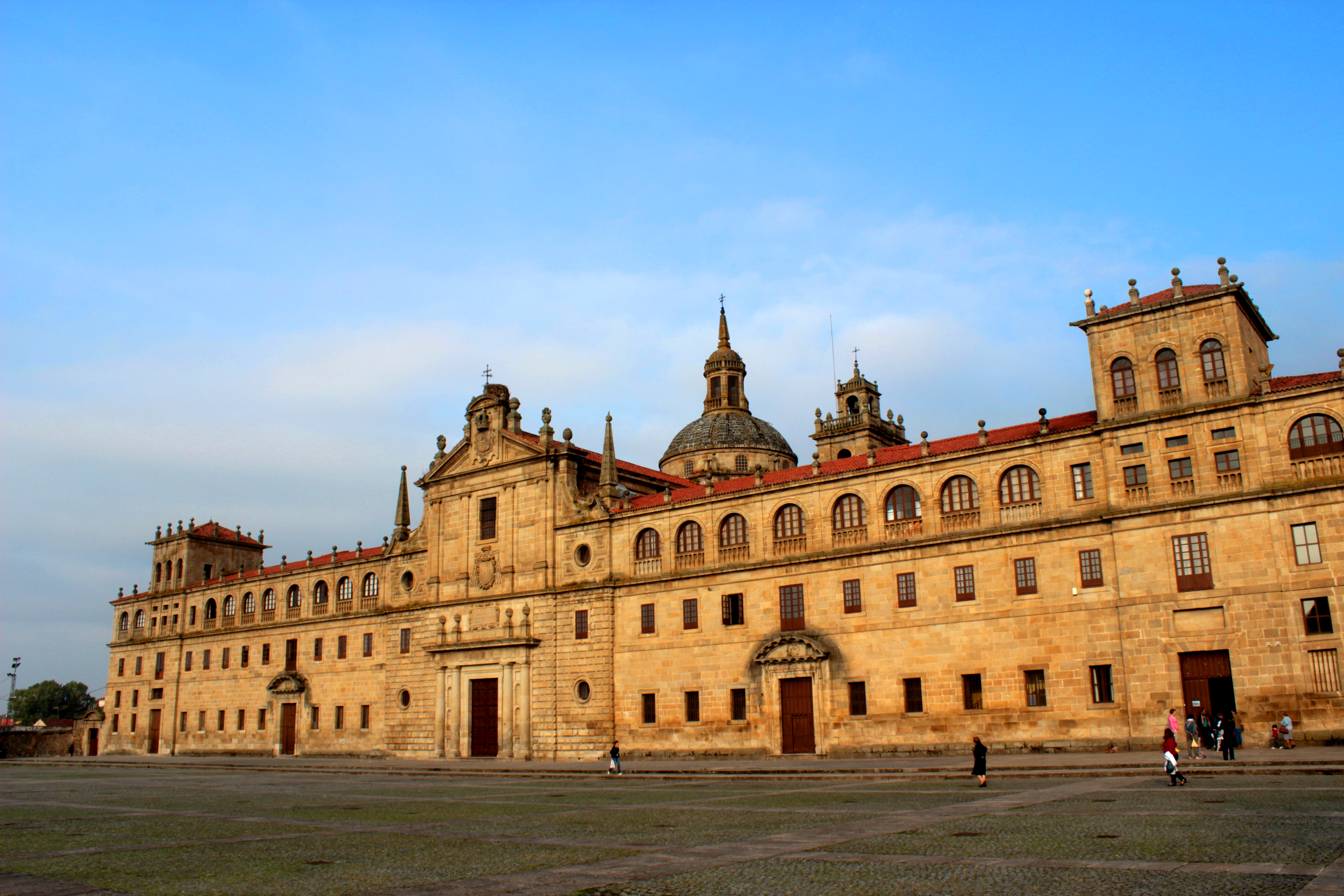
College in Monforte de Lemos

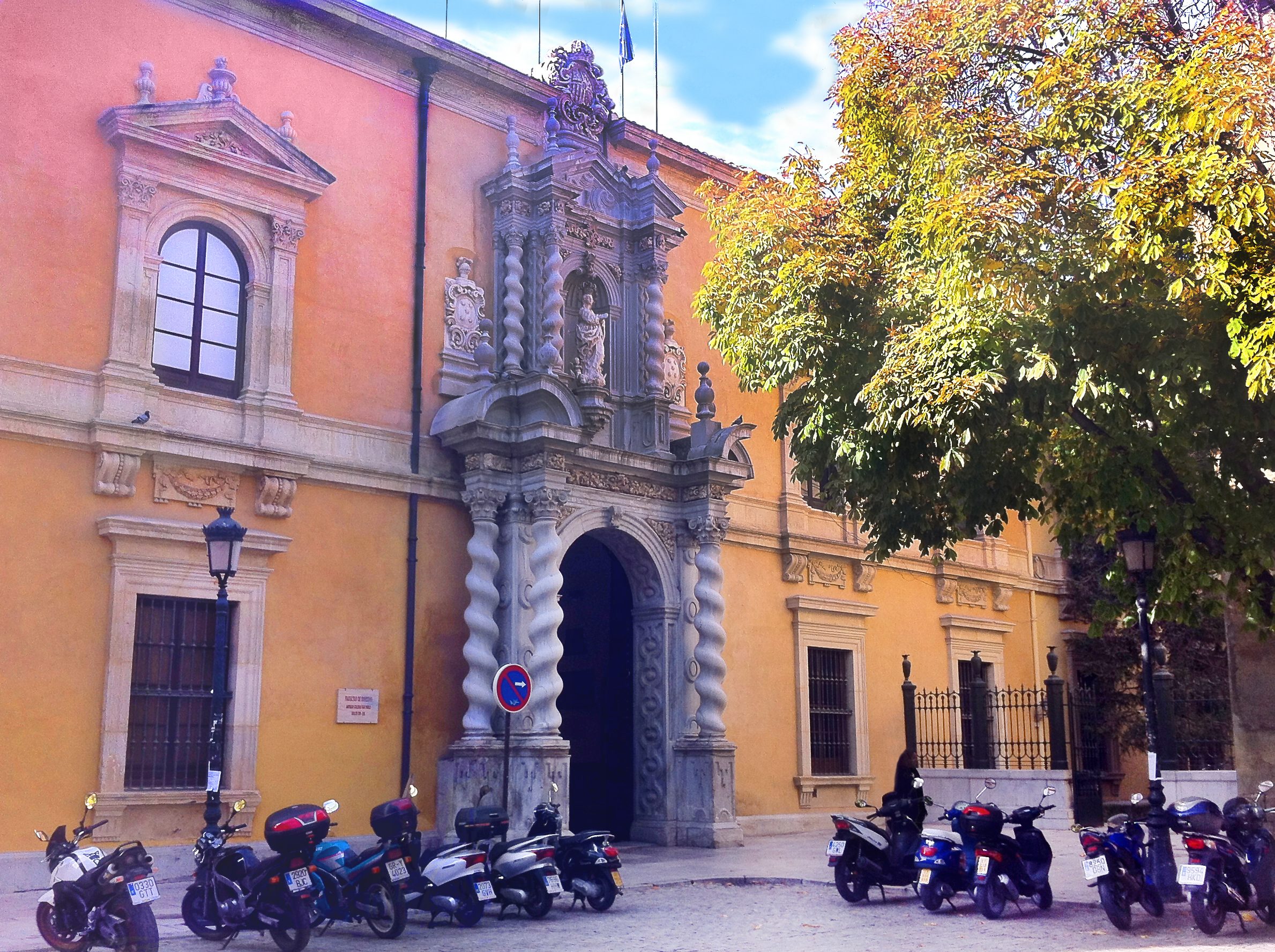
College in Granada

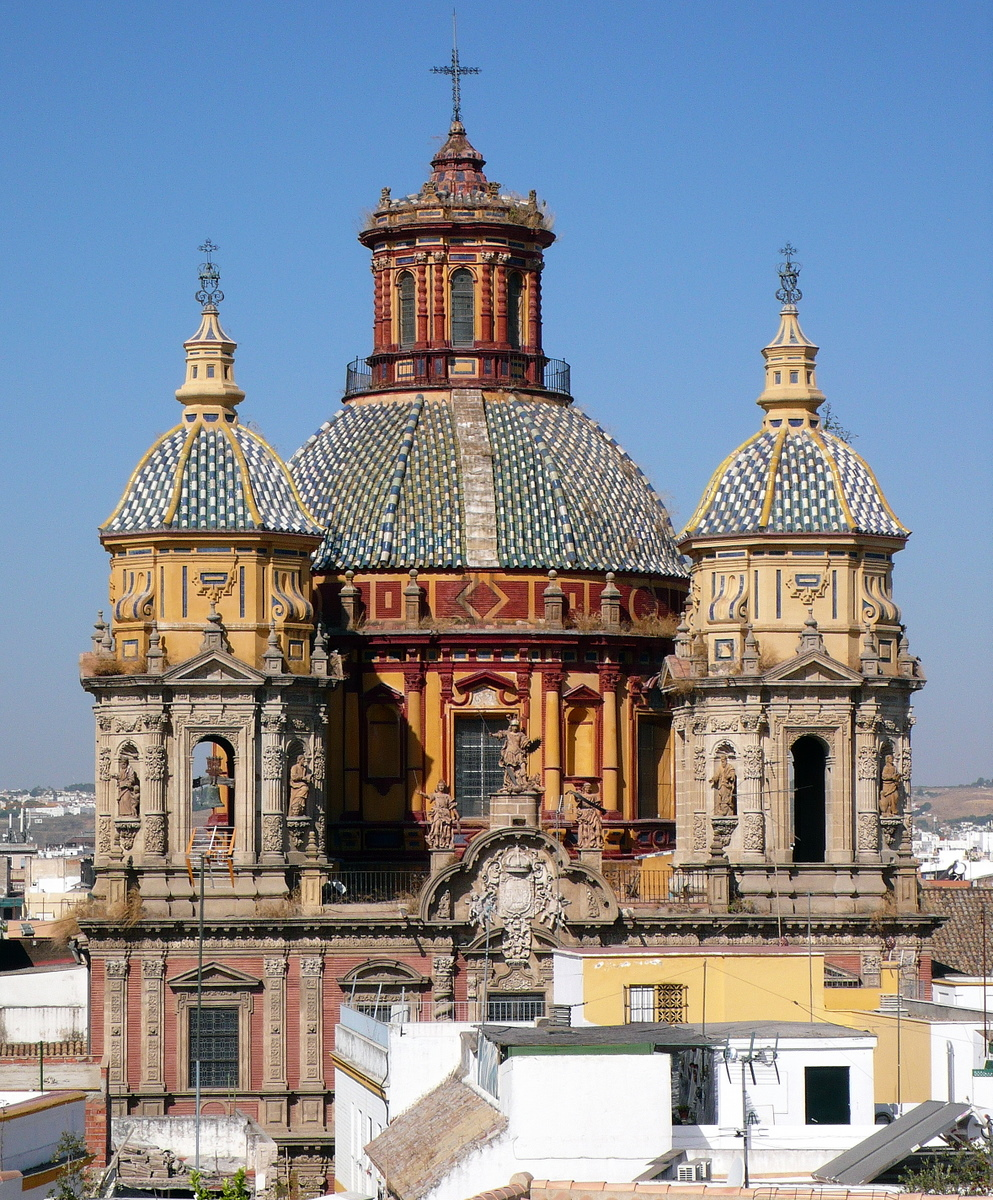
Novitiate in Seville

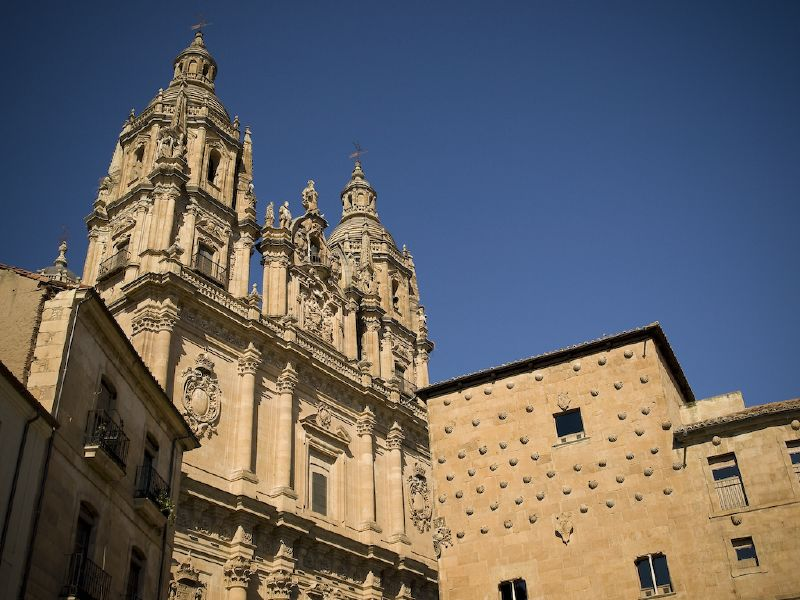
College church, Salamanca

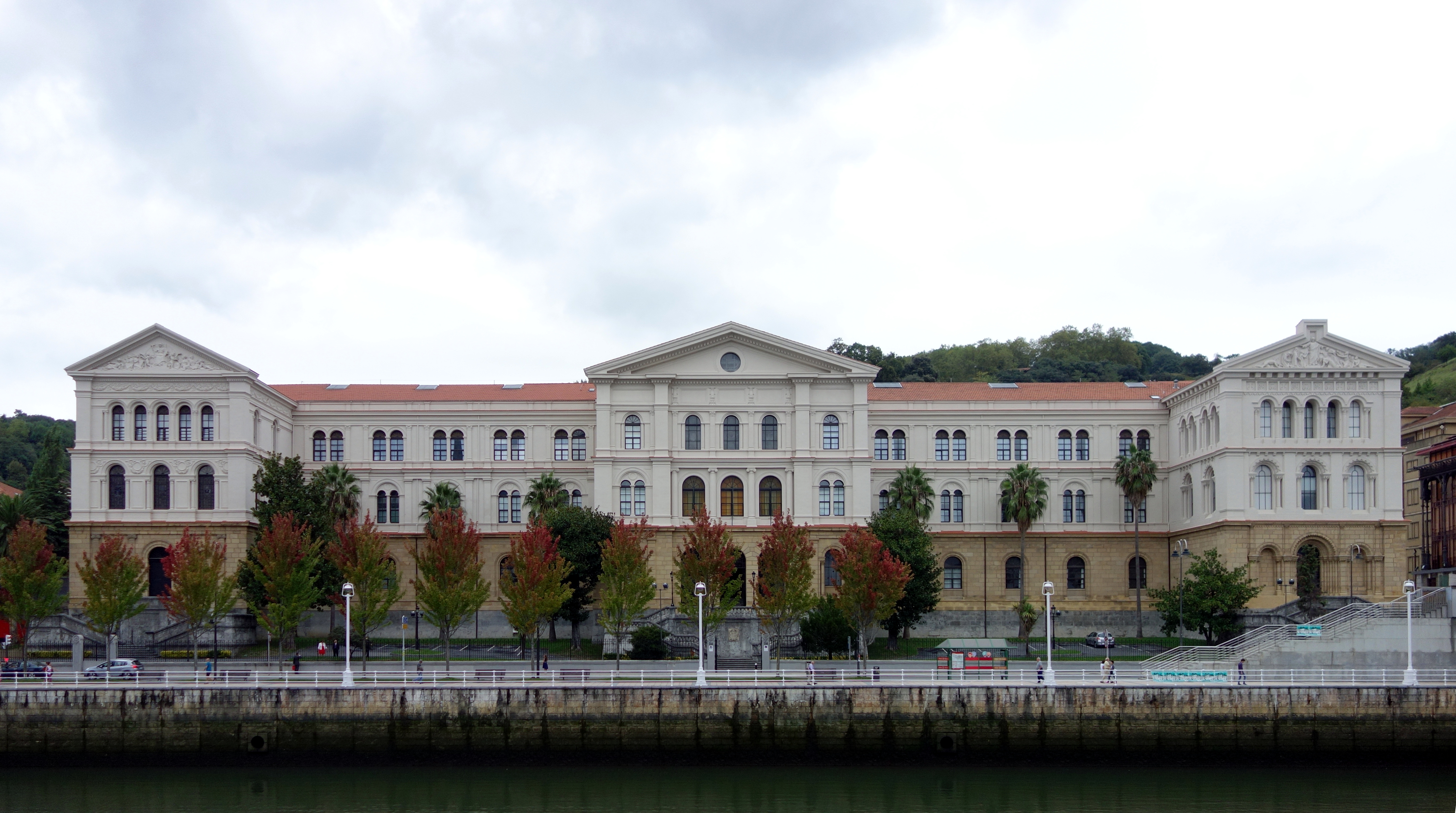
University of Deusto, Bilbao

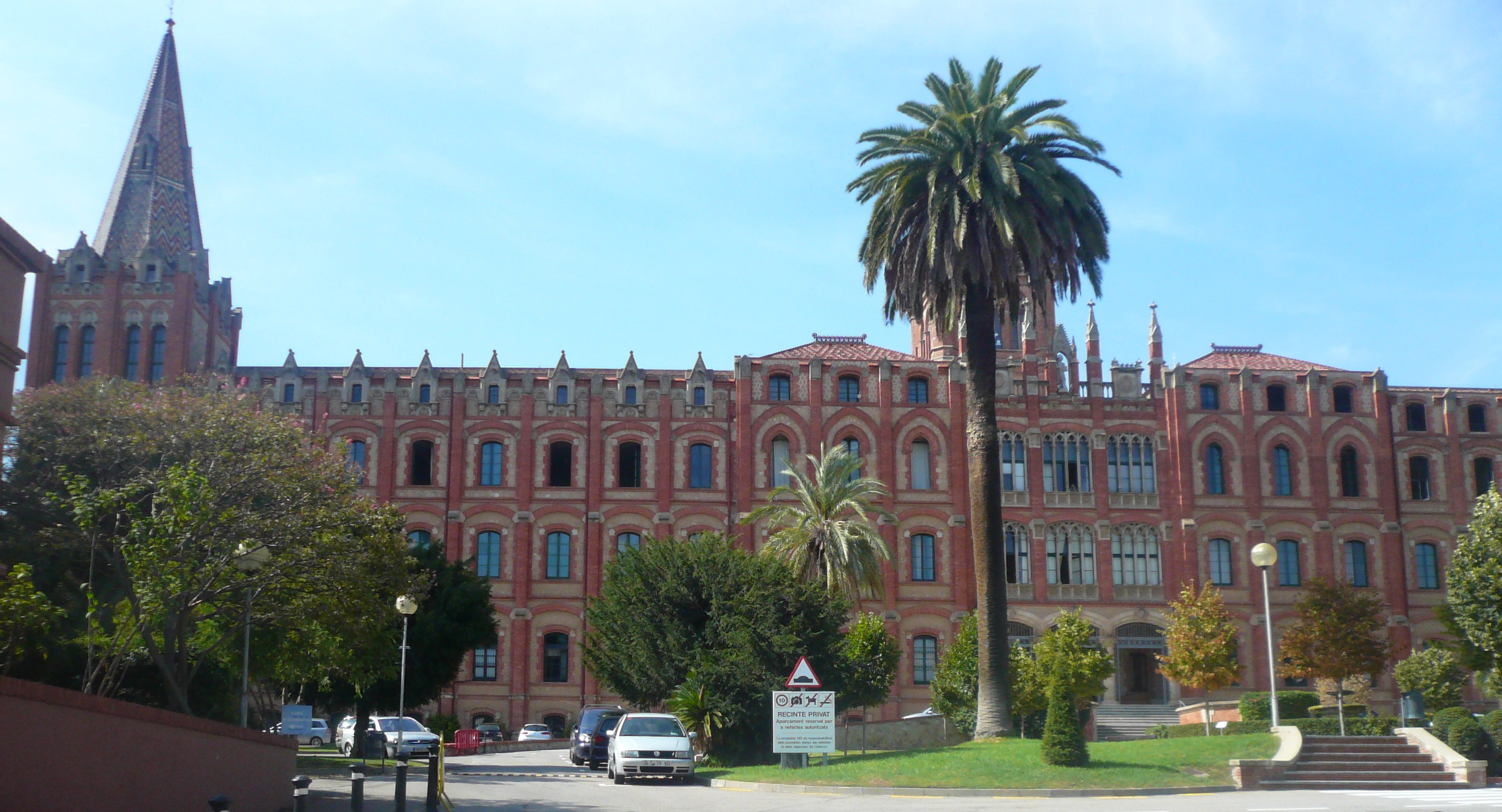
St Ignatius College, Barcelona

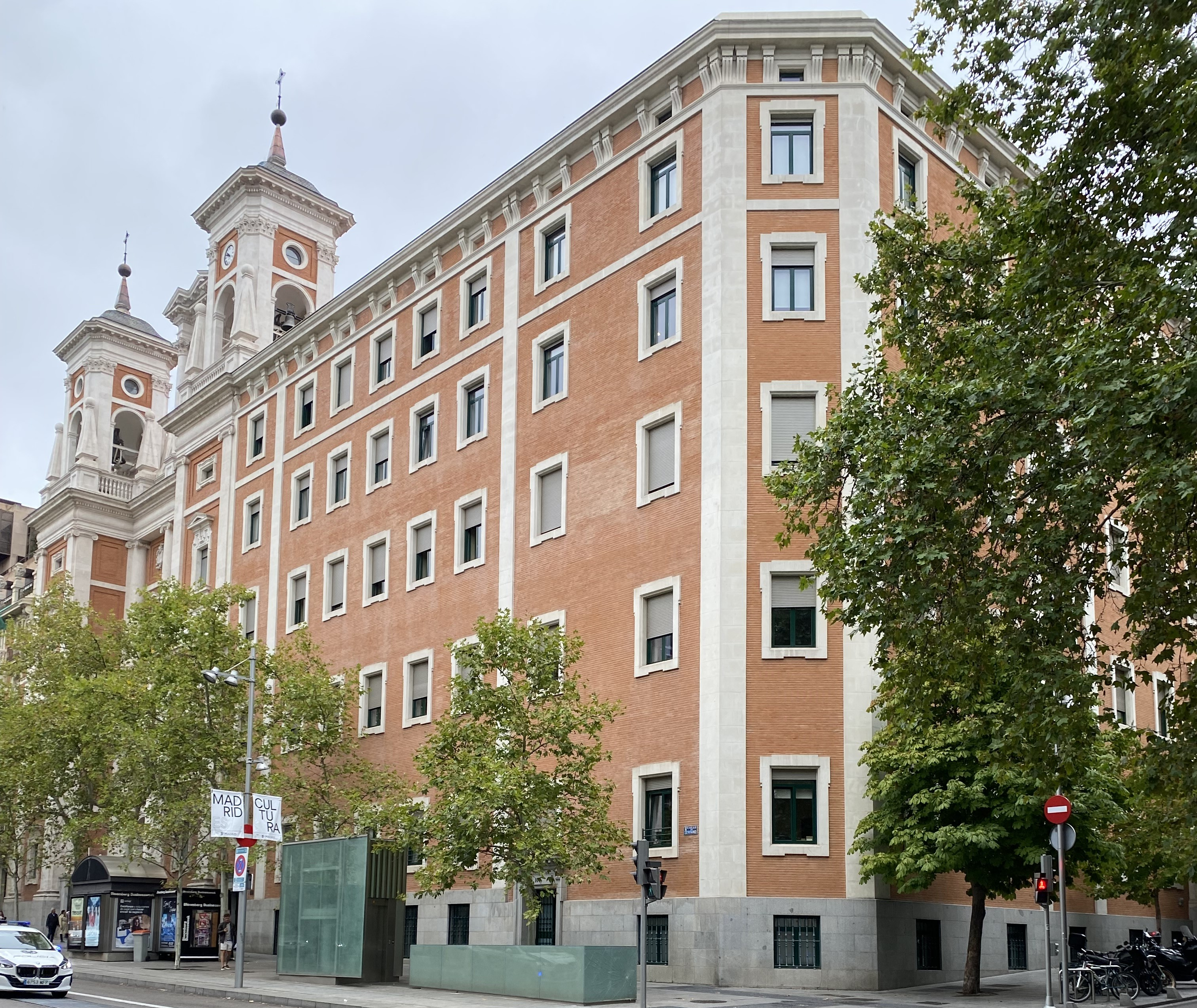
Jesuitas Maldonado complex in Madrid

- Sanctuary of Loyola in Azpeitia, Gipuzkoa (since 1682, with multiple interruptions between 1767 and 1885), birthplace of Ignatius of Loyola in 1491
- Castle of Xavier in Javier, Navarre (since c.1901), birthplace of Francis Xavier in 1506
- Cave of Saint Ignatius in Manresa, Catalonia (since 1603, presumably with interruptions), where Ignatius stayed in 1522–23
- Jesuit college in Alcalá de Henares (1545–1767), now Faculty of Law, and Church of Santa María
- Jesuit college of Saint Anthony, later (1609) of Saint Ignatius in Valladolid (1545–1767), now Church of Saints Michael and Julian
- Jesuit University in Gandia (1548–1767), now Real Colegio de las Escuelas Pías
- College of Saint Hermenegild in Sevilla (1554–1767), now Church of Saint Hermenegild
- Jesuit college in Córdoba (1555–1767), now Colegio La Inmaculada and Church of San Salvador y Santo Domingo de Silos
- College of Saint Stephen in Murcia (1555–1767), now the seat of the President of the Region of Murcia and Iglesia-Museo de San Esteban
- College of the Incarnation in Marchena (1556–1767), now Real Colegio de Santa Isabel
- Jesuit college in Zaragoza (1558–1767), now Seminary of Saint Charles Borromeo and Church of the Immaculate Conception
- Convent of Jesús del Monte in Loranca de Tajuña (1558–1767)
- Jesuit college in Segovia (1559–1767), now diocesan seminary and Church of the Company of Jesus
- Jesuit college in Palma de Mallorca (1561–1767, 1824–1837 and since 1919), now Our Lady of Mount Zion College
- College of Saint Paul in Valencia (1562–1767), now Instituto Lluís Vives including the former college chapel
- College of Saint Catherine in Trigueros near Huelva (1563–1767)
- Professed House in Seville (1565–1767), now Faculty of Arts of University of Seville and Church of the Annunciation
- Basílica de San Juan de Ávila in Montilla (1568–1767 and since 1944)
- Jesuit college in Toledo (1569–1767), now offices of the Ministry of Finance and Church of San Idelfonso, the latter again under Jesuit care since 1937
- Colegio Imperial de Madrid, after 1625 Reales Estudios de San Isidro in Madrid (1569–1767), now IES San Isidro and Colegiata de San Isidro
- Jesuit college in Málaga (1572–1767), now a school and Church of Santo Cristo de la Salud
- Jesuit college in Oviedo (1576–1767), now Church of Saint Isidore; other college buildings demolished in 1873, now Mercado de El Fontán
- Jesuit college in Arévalo (1579–1767), now Church of Saint Nicholas of Bari
- Jesuit novitiate in Villagarcía de Campos (1580–1767), now a museum and Collegiate Church of Saint Louis
- Jesuit college in Santander (c.1580–1767), now offices of the Justice Ministry and Church of the Annunciation
- Jesuit college in Palencia (1584–1767), now diocesan seat, major seminary and Church of the Company of Jesus
- Jesuit college for English students in Valladolid (1590–1767), now Royal English College of Saint Alban
- English College of St Gregory in Seville (1592–1767), now Escuela de Estudios Hispano-Americanos and Church of Saint Gregory
- Jesuit college in Monforte de Lemos near Lugo (1593–1767), now Colegio Nuestra Senora de la Antigua
- Irish College at Salamanca (1593–1762), now Colegio Mayor de Santiago el Zebedeo
- Jesuit college in Bergara (1593–1767), now office of National University of Distance Education and Colegio Aranzadi school
- College of Saint Paul in Granada (?–1767), now Faculty of Law and Church of Saints Justus and Pastor
- Jesuit college in Tudela (1600–1767), now Official Language School and office of National University of Distance Education
- Jesuit novitiate in Madrid (1602–1767), now part of Complutense University
- Jesuit college in Andújar, Andalusia (1606–1767), now municipal hospital
- New Jesuit novitiate in Seville (1609–1767), now Church of Saint Louis of France
- College of Saint Ambrosius in Valladolid (1610–1767), now Diocesan house and Sanctuary of the Gran Promesa
- Jesuit college of the Holy Spirit in Salamanca (1611–1767), now Pontifical University of Salamanca and Church of La Clerecía
- Jesuit residence on calle del Prado and church of Santa María del Prado in Madrid (1617–1627)
- College of Saint Theodemir in Carmona (1619–1767), now City Hall and Church of the Savior
- Professed house and church of Saint Francis Borgia, north of the Plaza Mayor in Madrid (1627–1767), demolished in 1837
- Jesuit college in Alicante (1629–1767), now Convent of the Blood of Christ
- Jesuit college in Graus (1651–1767, 1815–1820 and 1868–1873), now Espacio Pirineos
- Colegio de Cordellas in Barcelona (1662–1767), later rebuilt as Real Academia de Ciencias y Artes de Barcelona
- Church of San Lorenzo el Real in Burgos (1684–1767)
- Jesuit college in Cáceres (1692–1767), now Escuela Superior de Arte Dramático and Church of Saint Francis Xavier
- Seminario de Nobles in Madrid (1725–1767 and 1827–1830s), destroyed by fire in 1889
- The unfinished church of the Jesuits in Arcos de la Frontera, a building whose construction began in 1759 but remained unfinished after the expulsion of the Jesuits eight years later.
- Convento de San Marcos in León (1859–1868)
- Convento de Santo Domingo y Capilla del Rosario in Murcia (since 1871, with interruption in the 1930s)
- St. James the Apostle College in Vigo (since 1872, with interruption in the 1930s)
- College of the Savior in Zaragoza (since 1877, with interruption in the 1930s)
- Veruela Abbey, Province of Zaragoza (1877–1973, with interruption 1932–1939)
- Casa de l'Ardiaca in Barcelona (1878–1895)
- Our Lady of Remembrance College in Madrid (since 1880, with interruption in the 1930s)
- Monastery of San Salvador in Oña (1880–1967, with interruption 1932–1937)
- Col·legi Casp in Barcelona (since 1881, with interruption 1932–1939)
- College of Saint Joseph in Valladolid (since 1881, with interruption 1932–1936)
- St. Stanislaus Kostka College in Málaga (since 1882, with interruption in the 1930s)
- San Jose College in Durango (since 1885, with interruption in the 1930s)
- University of Deusto in Bilbao (since 1886, with interruption 1932–1940)
- Residence on calle Isabel la Católica and Church of the Sacred Heart and Saint Francis Borgia on calle de la Flor in Madrid (1887–1931), from 1911 professed house, destroyed by arson on 12 May 1931
- Colegio de la Inmaculada in Gijón (since 1890, with interruption during the Spanish Civil War)
- Francis Borgia College in the Ducal Palace of Gandia (since 1890, with interruption in the 1930s), birthplace of Francis Borgia
- Xavier College in Tudela (since 1891, with interruption 1932–1936)
- St. Ignatius College in Barcelona (since 1892, with interruption in the 1930s)
- College of San Jose in Villafranca de los Barros, Extremadura (since 1893, with interruption in the 1930s)
- Ebro Observatory in Roquetas (since 1904, with interruption in the 1930s)
- Chemical Institute of Sarrià, Barcelona (1905–1984, with interruption 1932–1939)
- San Jose Secondary Educational Center in Málaga (since 1906, with interruption in the 1930s)
- Royal Monastery of Santa María de Oia in Galicia (1910–1932)
- St. Ignatius College in Oviedo (since 1917, with interruption in the 1930s)
- St. Ignatius of Loyola College in Las Palmas, Gran Canaria (since 1917, with interruption in the 1930s)
- Our Lady of Begoña College in Bilbao (since 1921, with interruption in the 1930s)
- Fundación Balmesiana in Barcelona (since 1923)
- Vocational Training Centre Revillagigedo in Gijón (since 1929, with interruption in the 1930s)
- St. Ignatius College in San Sebastián (since 1929, with interruption in the 1930s)
- Cristo Rey Polytechnic Institute in Valladolid (since 1939)
- Kostka College in Barcelona (since 1939)
- Escuelas Profesionales de la Sagrada Familia (SAFA) schools in various cities (since 1940)
- Holy Family University Center in Úbeda (since 1941)
- Jesus the Worker polytechnic institute in Vitoria-Gasteiz (since 1942)
- Professed House of the calle de Serrano, known as Jesuitas Maldonado, and Church of Saint Francis Borgia in Madrid (since 1946), final resting place of Diego Laynez and Francis Borgia
- St. Ignatius College in Pamplona (since 1946)
- Immaculate Heart of Mary College, Portaceli in Seville (since 1950)
- St. Stanislaus Kostka College in Salamanca (since 1952)
- St. Ignatius of Loyola College in Alcalá de Henares (since 1953)
- College of the Immaculate in Alicante (since 1954)
- University of Deusto campus in San Sebastián (since 1956)
- St. Francis Xavier School in Burgos (since 1956)
- Nazareth College in Alicante (since 1957)
- Sacred Heart School in Logroño (since 1957)
- Cineclub Vida in Seville (since 1957)
- ESADE in Barcelona, consisting of ESADE Business School (since 1958) and ESADE Law School (since 1992)
- Sacred Heart Jesuit School in León (since 1959)
- Kostka College in Santander (since 1960)
- Xavier College in Santiago de Compostela (since 1961)
- Virgin of Guadalupe College in Badajoz (since 1962)
- Facultad de Ciencias Económicas y Empresariales ETEA in Córdoba (since 1963), now part of Loyola University Andalusia
- St. Mary of the Sea College in A Coruña (since 1964)
- University of Agricultural Engineering in Valladolid (since 1964)
- Colegio Mayor Loyola (Granada) (1966–2014)
- Saint Louis University Madrid Campus (since 1967)
- John XXIII School, Bellvitge in L'Hospitalet de Llobregat near Barcelona (since 1968)
- Comillas Pontifical University in Madrid (since 1969), following relocation from Comillas
- Colegio Mayor Loyola in Madrid (since 1969)
- Claver College, Raimat in Lleida (since 1970)
- Entreculturas in Madrid (since 1985)
- ALBOAN in Vitoria-Gasteiz (since 1996)
- Loyola University Andalusia in Seville (since 2010)

=== Sweden ===
- St. Eugenia's Church in Stockholm (since 1860), at the present location facing Kungsträdgården since 1982
- Newman Institute in Uppsala (since 2001)

=== Switzerland ===
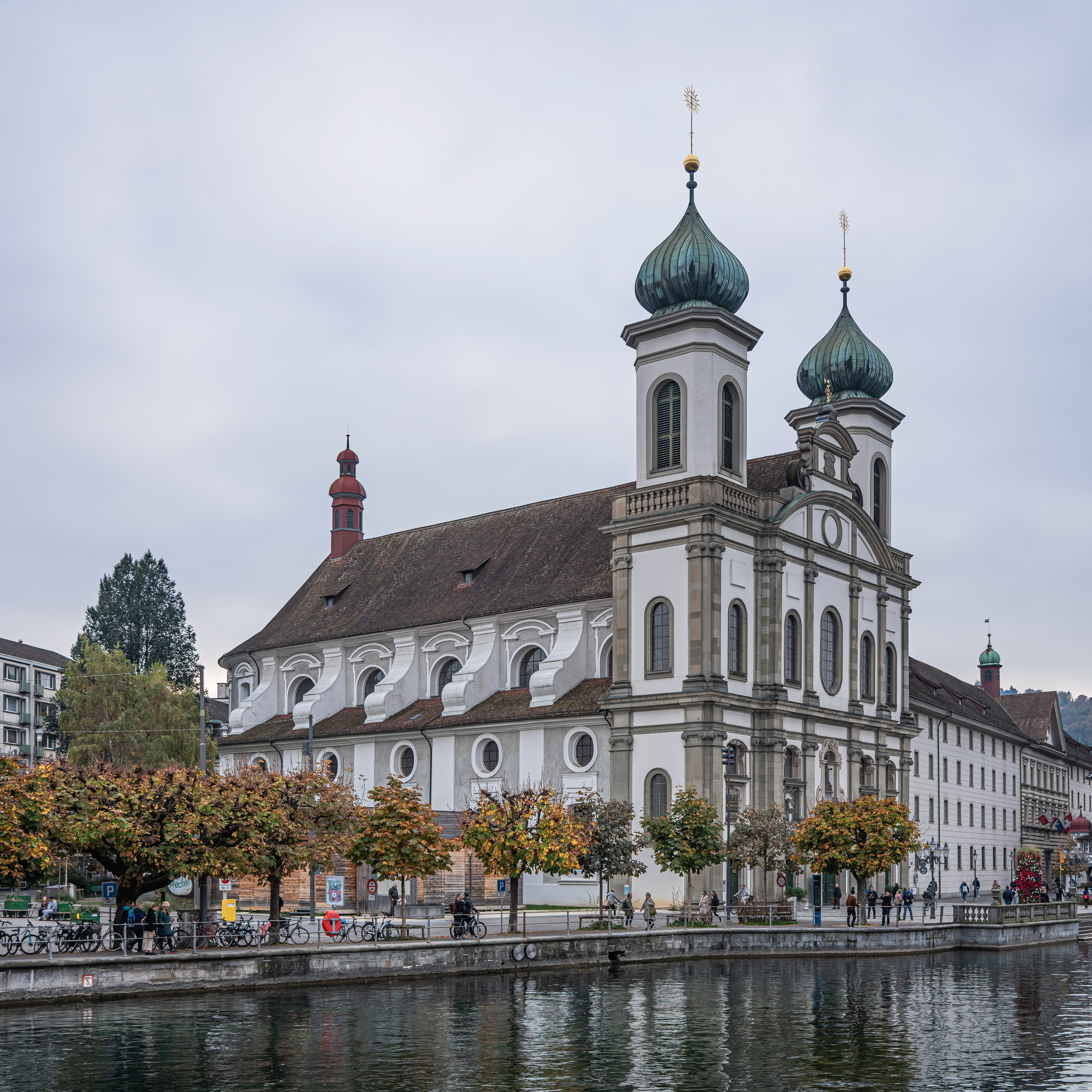
College in Lucerne

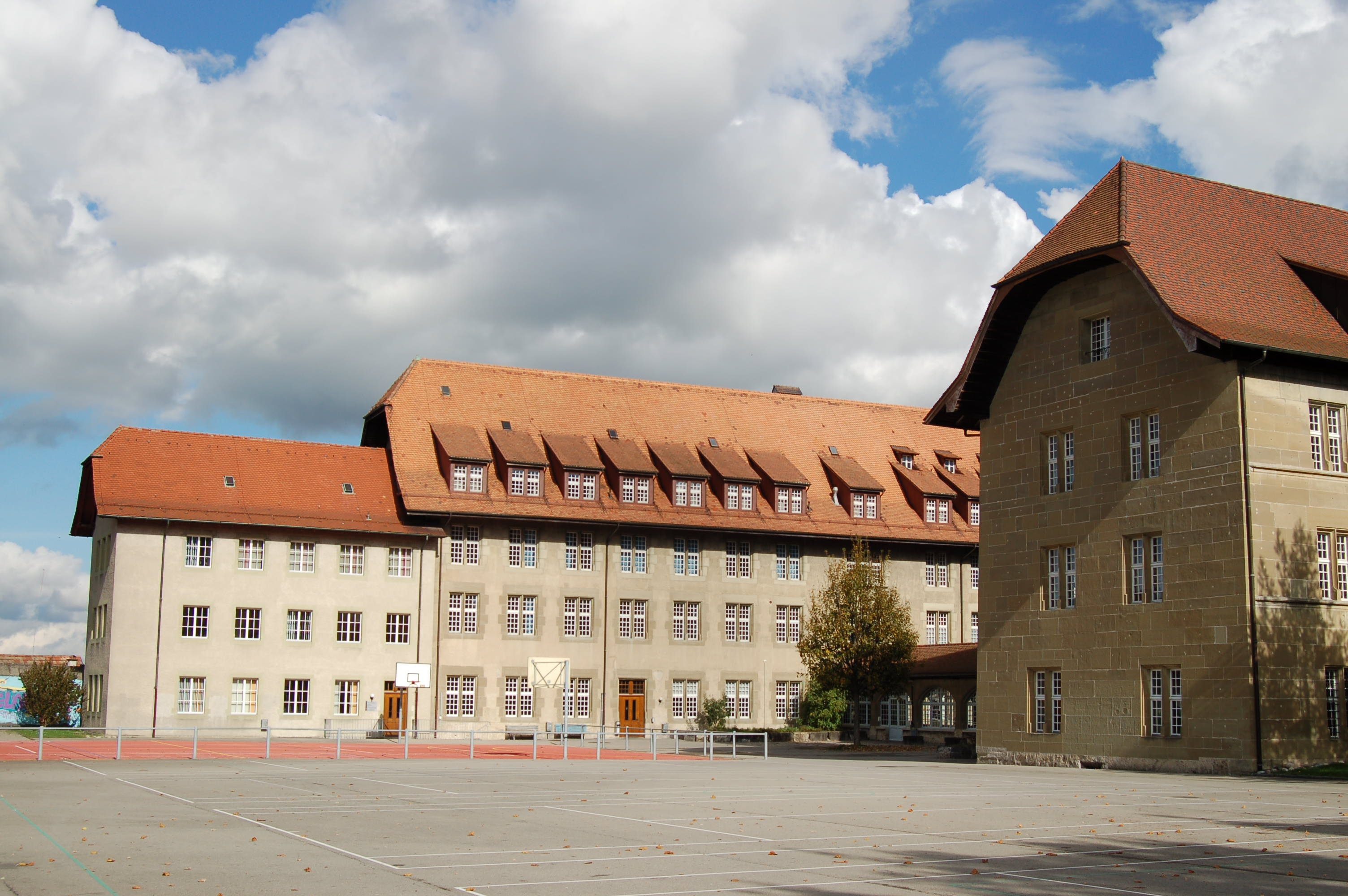
College in Fribourg

- Jesuit college in Lucerne (1574–1773 and 1844–1847), now seat of the Canton of Lucerne and Jesuit Church
- Jesuit college in Fribourg (1582–1773 and 1818–1847), now Collège Saint-Michel and Church of Saint Michael, burial place of Peter Canisius; precursor to University of Fribourg
- Jesuit college in Porrentruy (1591–1773), now Lycée cantonal de Porrentruy
- Jesuit college in Bellinzona (1646–1675)
- Jesuit college in Solothurn (1646–1773), now a school (Schulhaus Kollegium) and Church of the Jesuits; precursor to Kantonsschule Solothurn
- Jesuit college in Brig (1662–1773 and 1814–1847), now Kollegium Spiritus Sanctus Brig
- Jesuit college in Sion (1734–1773 and 1814–1847), now Church of the Jesuits
- Jesuit school in Estavayer-le-Lac (1827–1847)
- Jesuit school in Schwyz (1836–1847)
- Bad Schönbrunn Jesuit Center in Menzingen (since 1929)
- Jesuit center of Notre-Dame-de-la-Route in Villars-sur-Glâne near Fribourg (since 1959)

=== Ukraine ===
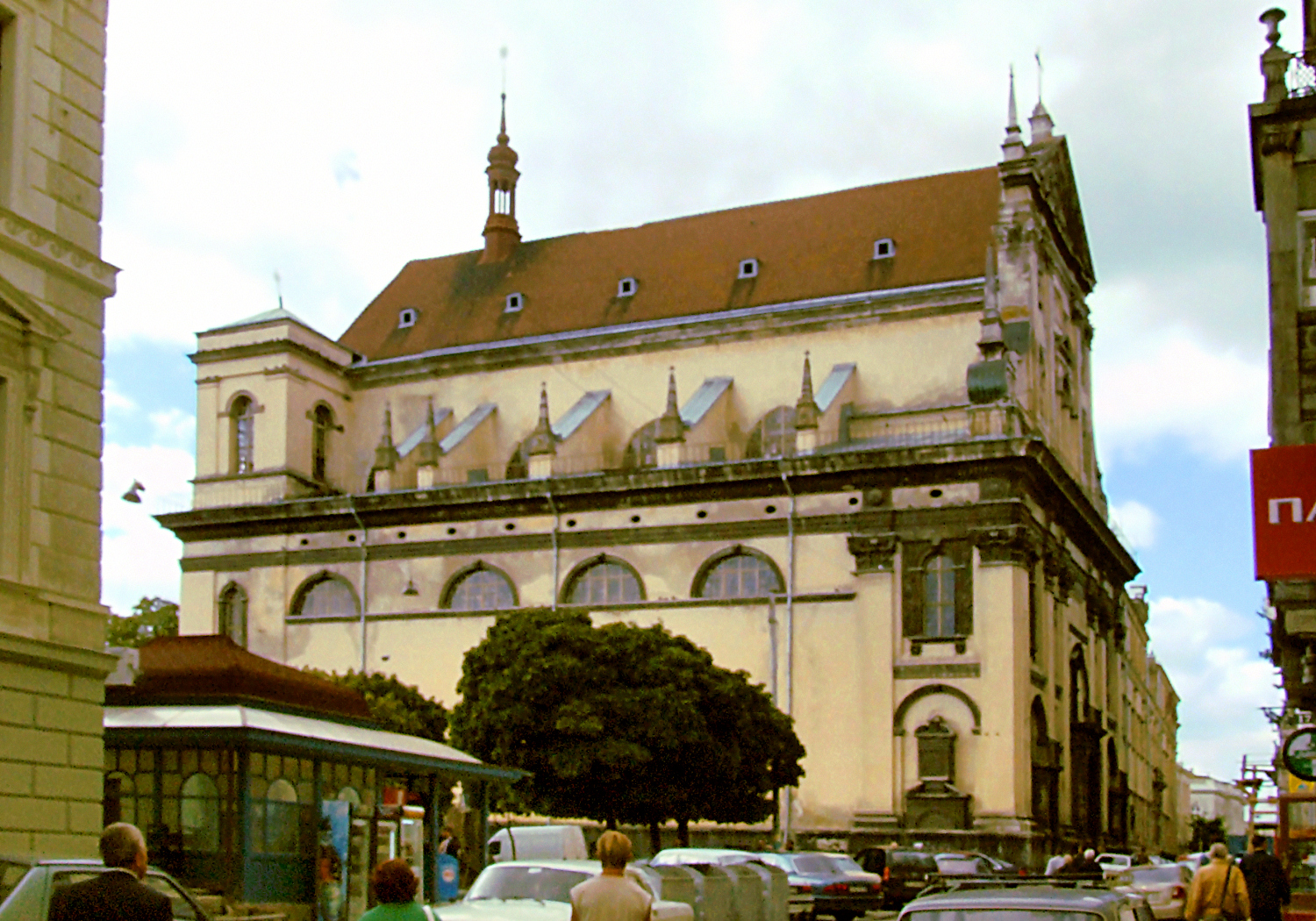
College church, Lviv

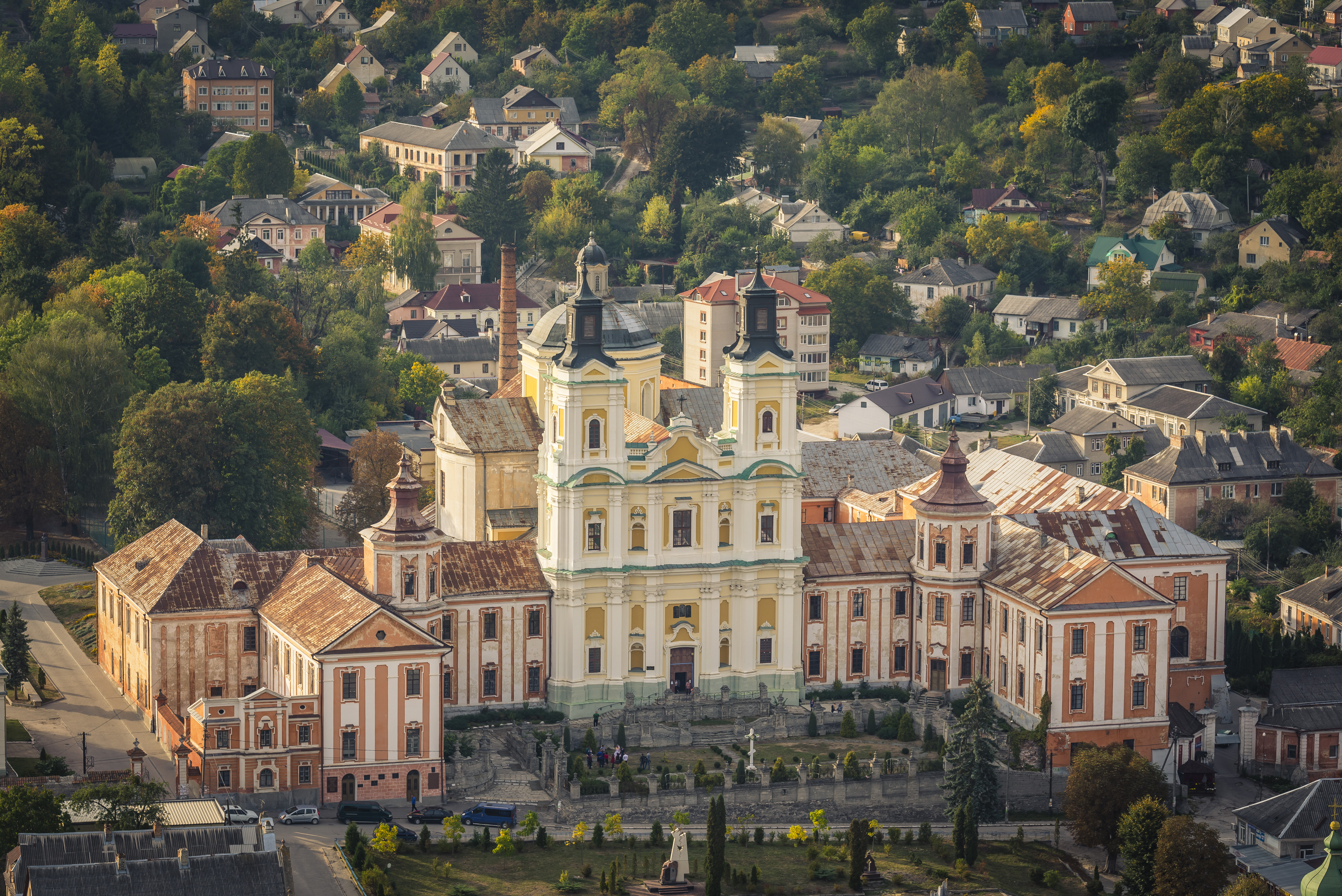
College at Kremenets

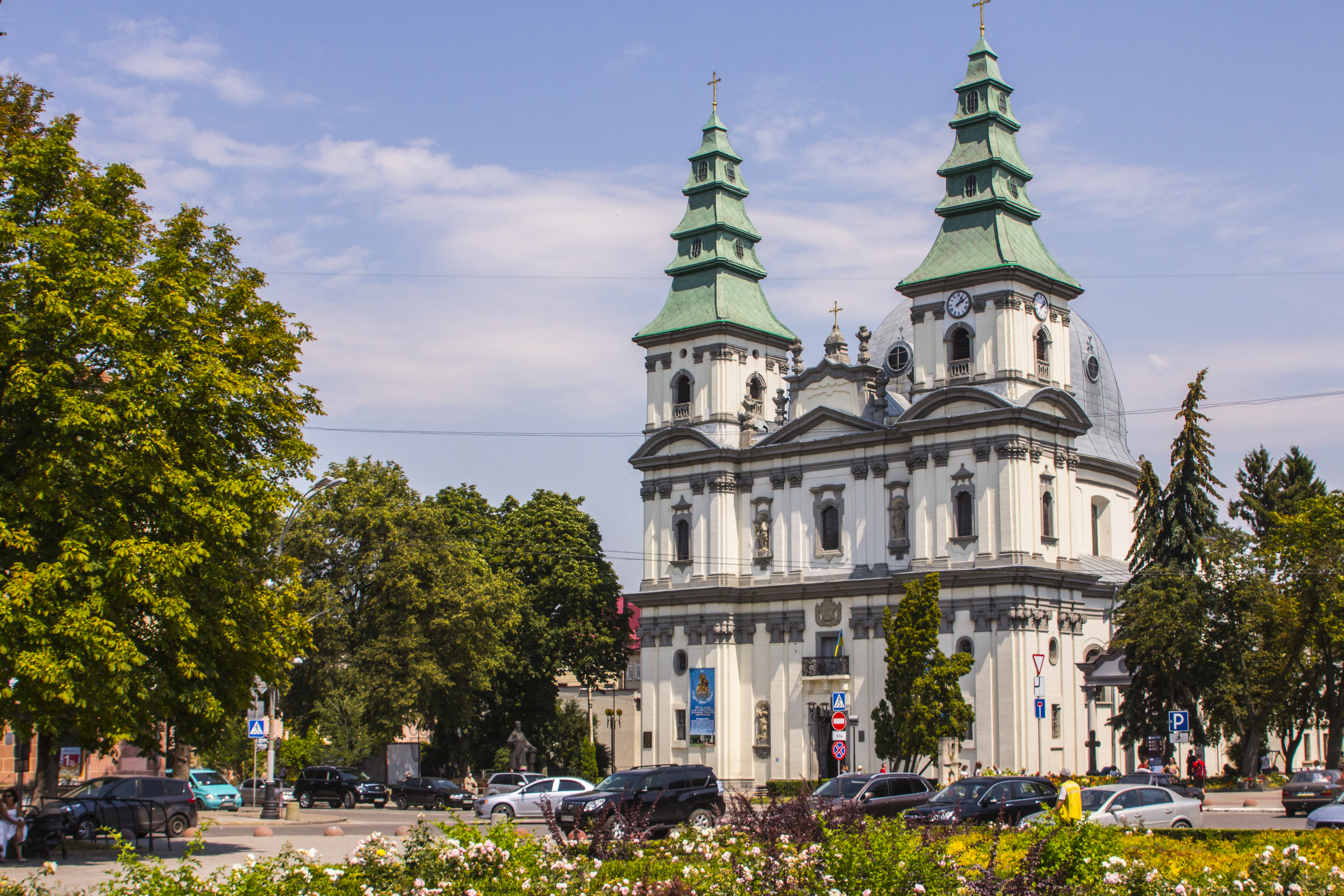
College church, Ternopil

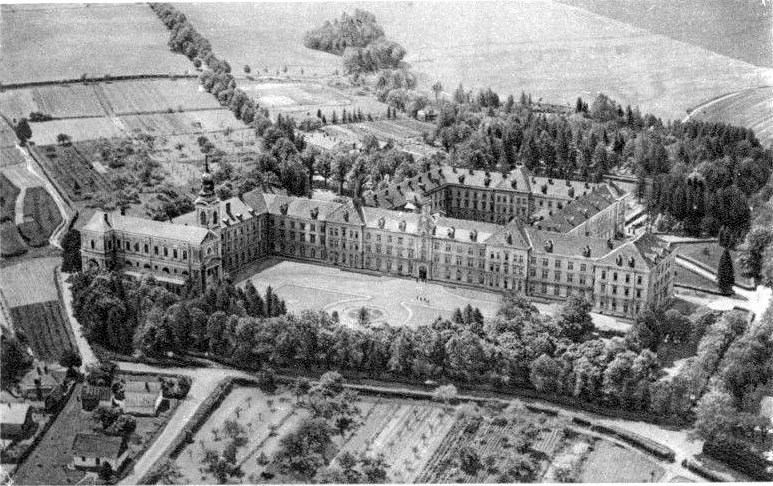
1930s aerial view of Chyrów College, (Poland), now Khyriv

- Jesuit college in Lutsk (1606–1773), now National University of Food Technologies and Catholic Cathedral of Saints Peter and Paul
- Jesuit college in Lviv (1608–1773, 1820–1848 and 1852–1946), now School No. 62 and Greek Catholic Church of Saints Peter and Paul; precursor to the University of Lviv
- Jesuit college in Kamianets-Podilskyi (1611–1773, with interruption 1672–1699), now Faculty of History of Kamyanets-Podilsky Ivan Ohienko National University; the college church of Saint Stanislaus was demolished in 1833
- Jesuit college in Bar (c.1614–1773), later a Carmelite monastery
- Jesuit college in Ostroh (1624–1773); church and other buildings destroyed by fire in the 19th century
- Jesuit residence in Vinnytsia (1642–1773), in a complex known as "Vinnytsia walls", now a state archive, lyceum and folklore museum
- Jesuit college in Ovruch (1670s–1773), church rebuilt in 2001 as Orthodox Cathedral of the Transfiguration
- Jesuit college in Sambir (c.1700–1773), now Church of Saint Stanislaus
- Jesuit college in Zhytomyr (1724–1773), now in ruins known as the cells of the Jesuits
- Jesuit college in Ivano-Frankivsk (1728–1773), later State Gymnasium of Stanyslaviv, now Faculty of Anatomy of Ivano-Frankivsk National Medical University and Greek Catholic Cathedral of the Resurrection
- Jesuit residence in Volodymyr-Volynskyi (1718–1773), now Orthodox Cathedral of the Nativity
- Jesuit college in Kremenets (1750–1773), now Taras Shevchenko Regional Academy and Orthodox Church of the Transfiguration
- Jesuit mission in Odessa (Odesa) (1804–1820)
- Jesuit college in Ternopil (1820–1848 and 1852–1886), now Greek Catholic Cathedral of the Immaculate Conception
- Jesuit school in Khyriv (1886–1939), since 1996 chapel reconsecrated as Greek Catholic Church of Saint Nicholas. Estate now under redevelopment
- Church of the Sacred Heart of Jesus in Chernivtsi (1891–1941)
- Church of Saint Stanislaus Kostka in Ivano-Frankivsk (1893–1939), now Orthodox Cathedral of the Holy Trinity
- Church of Saint Ignatius in Kolomyia (1895–1946), now Greek Catholic
- Church of the Jesuits in Ternopil (1899–1945); some architectonic elements kept in post-World War II commercial building
- Jesuit monastery in Hnizdychiv (1931–1939), now a Redemptorist monastery
- Eastern Catholic Jesuit seminary at the former Bernardine monastery in Dubno (1931–1939)

=== United Kingdom ===
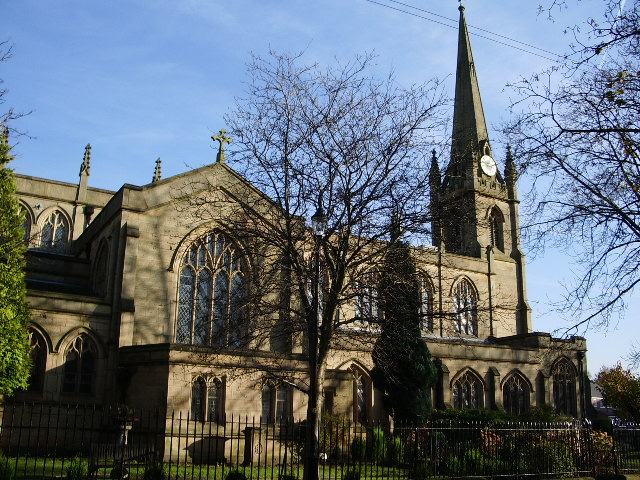
St Ignatius, Preston

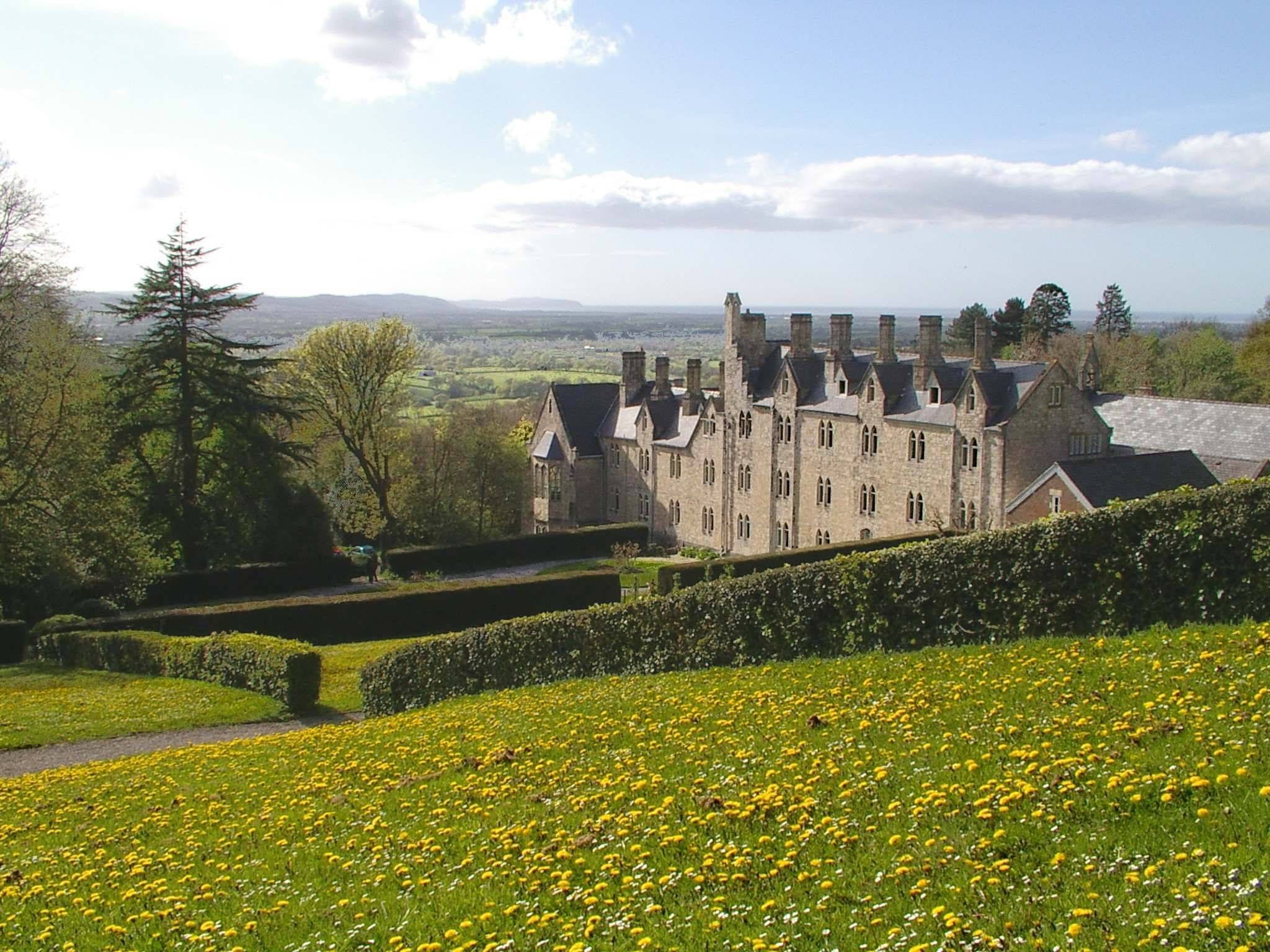
St Beuno's Centre in Tremeirchion, Wales

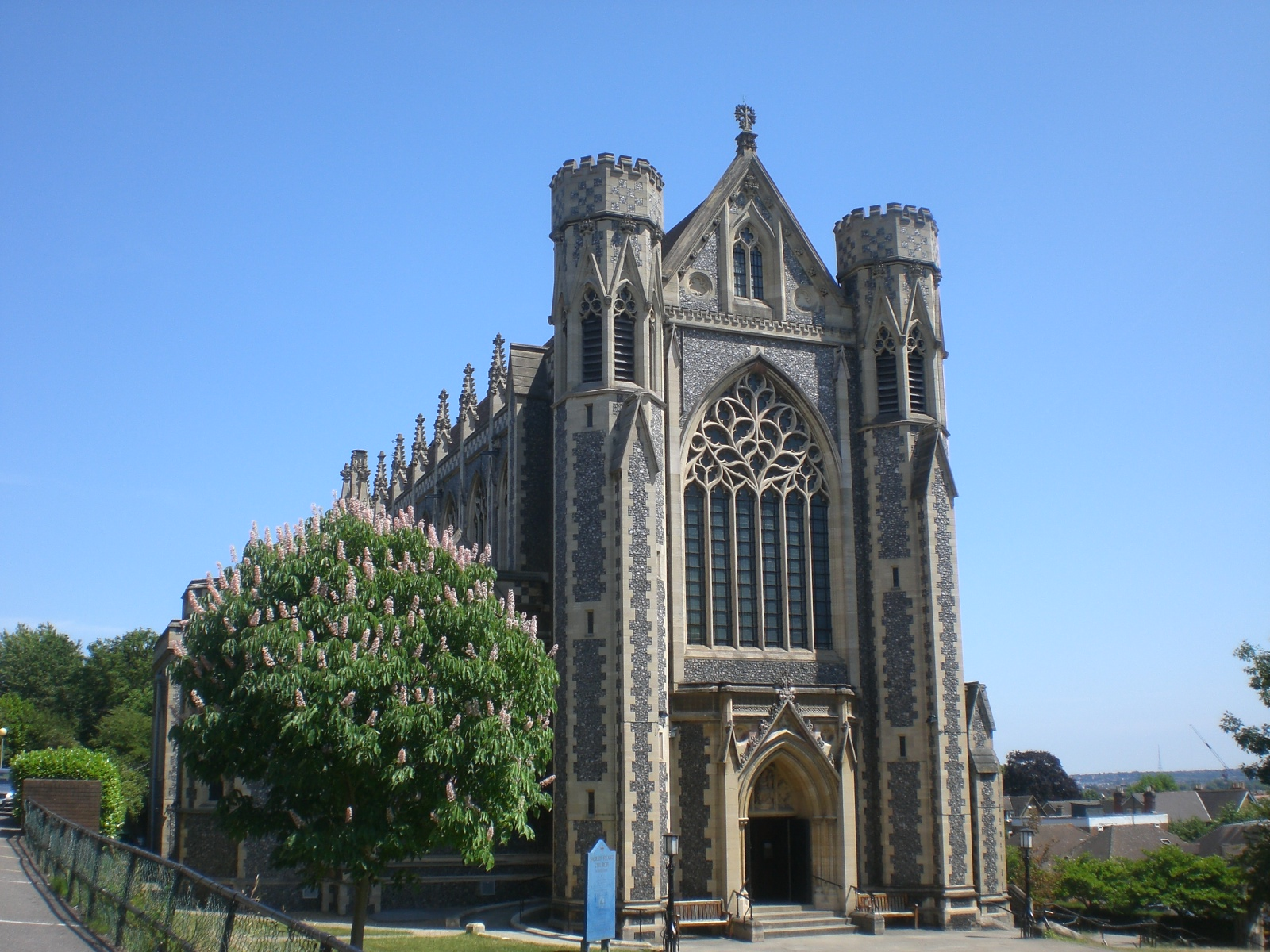
Sacred Heart, Wimbledon

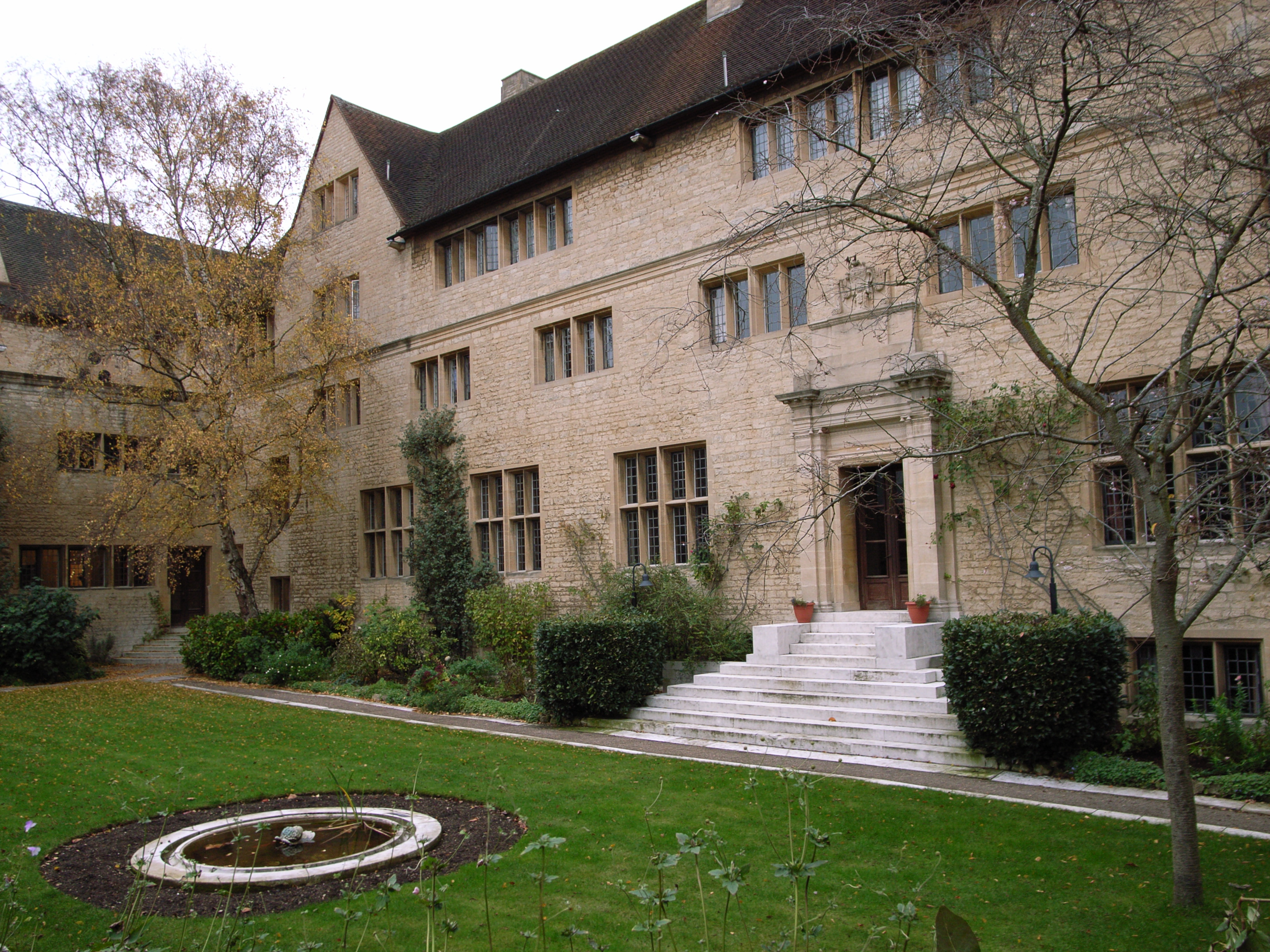
Campion Hall, Oxford

==== England ====
- Jesuit college at Savoy Palace, London (1687–1688)
- Jesuit college in Fenchurch Street, London (1687–1688)
- St Joseph's School, Hurst Green, Lancashire (since 1688)
- St Mary's Chapel, Friargate, Preston (1763–1990)
- Our Lady Help of Christians Church, Portico, Merseyside (1790–1900s)
- St Mary on the Quay, Bristol (1790–1996)
- St Wilfrid's Church in Preston, Lancashire (since 1792)
- Stonyhurst College in Lancashire (since 1794)
- St Michael and St John Church, Clitheroe (1799–2008)
- Hodder Place, Stonyhurst (1803–1970)
- St Mary's Church, Clayton-le-Moors (1810–1873)
- St John's Church, Wigan (1819–1933)
- St Austin's Church, Wakefield (1827–1931)
- St George's Church, Worcester (1829–1990)
- Saint Ignatius Church in Preston, Lancashire (1833–2001), now Syro-Malabar Cathedral of St Alphonsa
- St Francis Xavier Church, Hereford (1837–1858)
- St Edmund's Church, Bury St Edmunds (1837–1900s)
- St Stephen's Church, Skipton (1842–1914)
- St Francis Xavier's College in Liverpool (1842–1974)
- St Francis Xavier Church in Liverpool (1842–2023)
- Mount St Mary's College in Spinkhill, Derbyshire (since 1842)
- Church of the Immaculate Conception, Farm Street in London (since 1843)
- Church of the Immaculate Conception, Spinkhill, Derbyshire (1844–2000s)
- Church of St Walburge, Preston (1847–1900s)
- St Mary's Church, Great Yarmouth (1850–1962)
- Annunciation Church, Chesterfield (1854–1900s)
- St Joseph's Roman Catholic Church, Leigh, Greater Manchester (1855–1900s)
- Our Lady Immaculate and St Joseph Church, Prescot, Merseyside (1856–1932)
- Sacred Heart Church, Blackpool (1857–2004)
- Holy Cross Church, St Helens (1860–1933)
- Parkstead House in London (1861–1962)
- Beaumont College, Old Windsor, (1861–1967)
- Preston Catholic College, (1863–1978)
- Our Lady Star of the Sea Church, Lowestoft (1867–1882)
- St Joseph and St Francis Xavier Church, (1868–1962)
- Sacred Heart Church, Accrington (1869–1958)
- Sacred Heart Church, Bournemouth (1870–1969)
- Church of the Holy Name of Jesus in Manchester (1871–1985, 2013–)
- Ditton Hall Jesuit community in Ditton, Cheshire (1872–1895), now St Michael's Church
- Oxford Oratory in Oxford (1875–1990)
- St Ignatius Church, South Ossett, Wakefield, (1877–1910)
- Sacred Heart Church in Wimbledon, London (1877–2012)
  - Wimbledon College, established next to the church in 1892
  - Donhead Preparatory School, created nearby in 1933
  - St Winefride Church, South Wimbledon, a chapel of Sacred Heart Church (1905–1962)
  - Christ the King Church, Wimbledon Park (founded 1913, construction completed 1926)
  - Jesuit Missions UK, present on the same street
- St Joseph Church, Roehampton (1881–1948)
- Corpus Christi Church, Brixton, London (1887–2005)
- St John's Beaumont School in Old Windsor (1888–2025)
- Jesuit presbytery in London (since 1888), now London Jesuit Centre
- St Ignatius Church, Stamford Hill in London (since 1894)
- St Ignatius' College in Enfield, London (since 1894)
- Corpus Christi Church, Boscombe near Bournemouth (since 1895)
- Campion Hall in Oxford (since 1896)
- St Michael's College, Leeds (1905–2008)
- Sacred Heart Church, Leeds (1905–1947)
- Campion House in Osterley, West London (1911–2004)
- Holy Trinity Church, Chipping Norton (1922–1969)
- Oakwood House retreat centre, Romiley, Stockport, moved to Rainhill Hall in 1923
- Rainhill Hall or Loyola Hall retreat centre in Rainhill, Merseyside (1923–2014)
- Church of St Mary, Lowe House, St Helens (1924–1981)
- Heythrop Park in Oxfordshire (1926–1970)
- Our Lady of Lourdes Church, Leeds (1930–1947)
- Corby Hall retreat centre, Sunderland (1933–1973)
- St Aidan's Catholic Academy, Sunderland (1935–1948)
- St Peter's Catholic School, Bournemouth (1936–1947)
- Barlborough Hall School, Spinkhill (since 1939)
- Loyola Preparatory School, Buckhurst Hill, Essex (1944–2001)
- St Mary's Hall, Stonyhurst (since 1946)
- Harlaxton Manor, novitiate, Lincolnshire (1948–1965)
- Southwell House, Fitzjohn's Avenue, Hampstead, London (1950–2009)
- St Aloysius' College Junior School, Glasgow (since 1954)
- The Campion School (1962–1965)
- Heythrop College, University of London in London (1971–2018)
- Jesuit Refugee Service, Wapping, London (since 1980s)
- St Anselm's Church, Southall in London (since 2001)
- Oxford University Catholic Chaplaincy (since 2007)
- Heythrop Library, at the London Jesuit Centre (since 2019)

==== Scotland ====
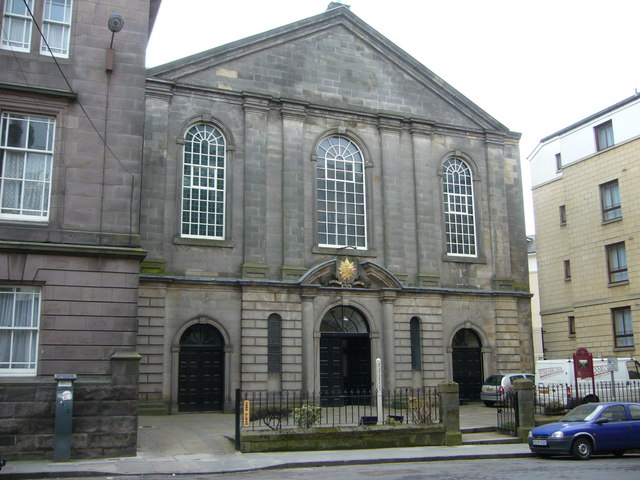
Sacred Heart, Edinburgh

- Jesuit college at Holyrood Palace in Edinburgh (1687–1688)
- St David's Church, Dalkeith (1854–1944)
- St Aloysius' College and St Aloysius Church in Glasgow (since 1859)
- Catholic Church of the Sacred Heart of Jesus in Edinburgh (since 1860)
- Craighead House, Blantyre, South Lanarkshire (early 1900s to 2000)
- Woodhall House, Edinburgh (1959–1970)
- Acre House, Glasgow (1965–1977)

==== Wales ====
- Welsh Jesuit College of St Francis Xavier at Cwm, Llanrothal (1622–1678)
- St Winefride's Church, Holywell (1832–1900s)
- St Beuno's Ignatian Spirituality Centre in Tremeirchion (since 1847)
- Our Lady of the Assumption Church, Rhyl (1863–1900s)
- Our Lady of Ransom and the Holy Souls Church, Llandrindod Wells (opened 1907)

==== Jersey ====
- Maison Saint Louis college in Saint Saviour near Saint Helier (1880–1954), now a hotel
- Naval training school in Saint Saviour (1894-c.1920), now Highlands College

== Americas ==
=== Argentina ===
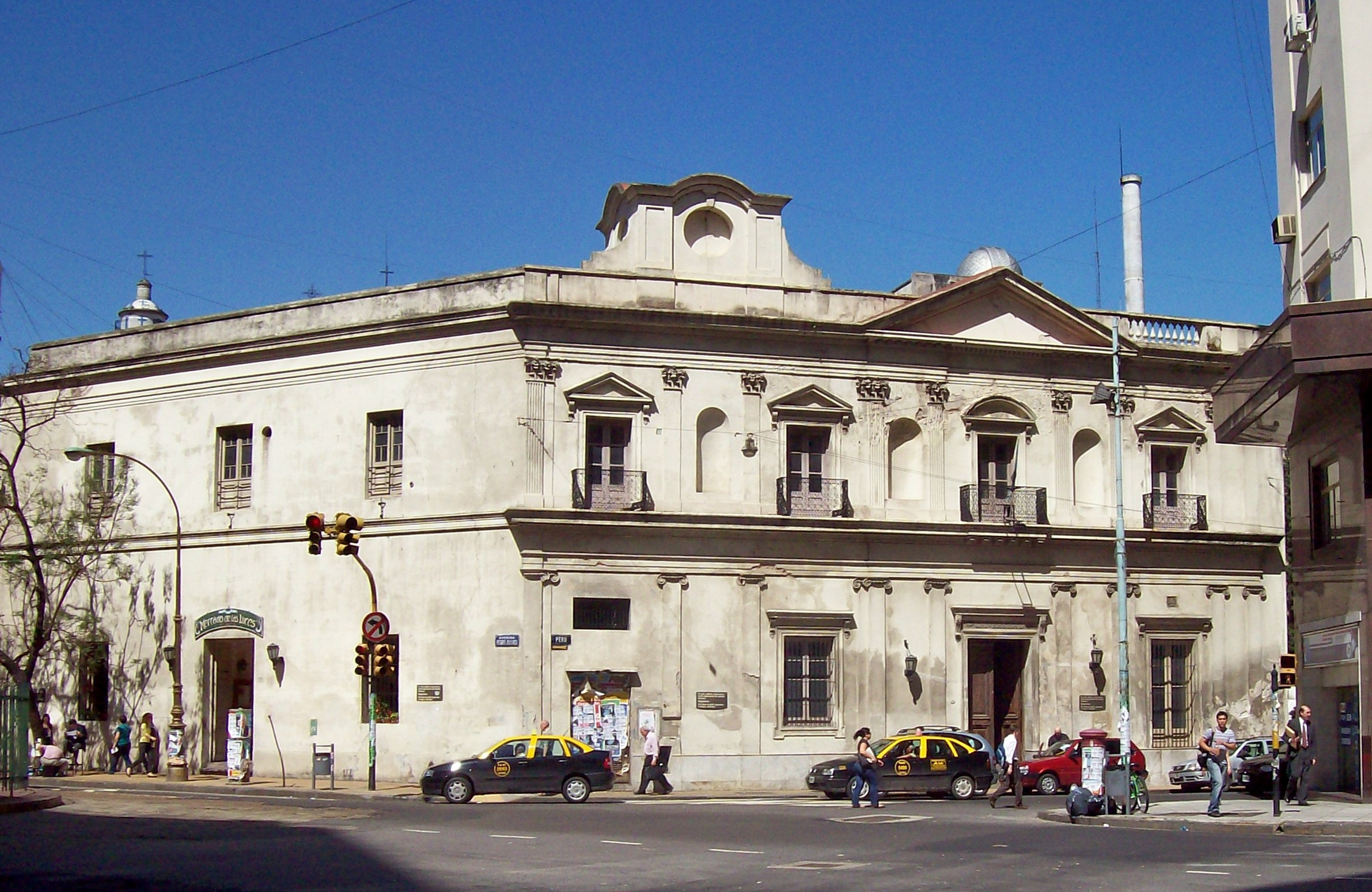
College in Buenos Aires

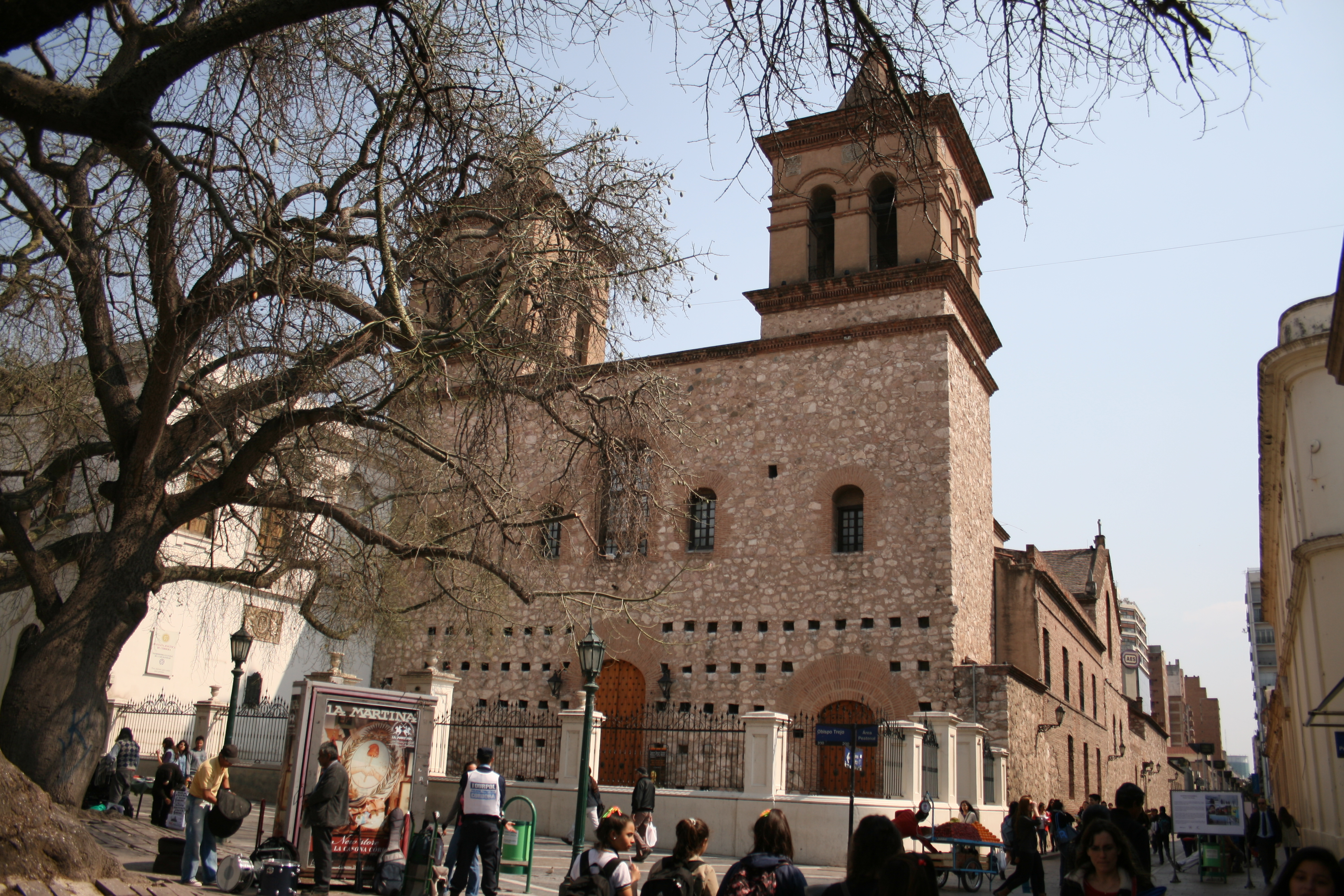
College church, Córdoba

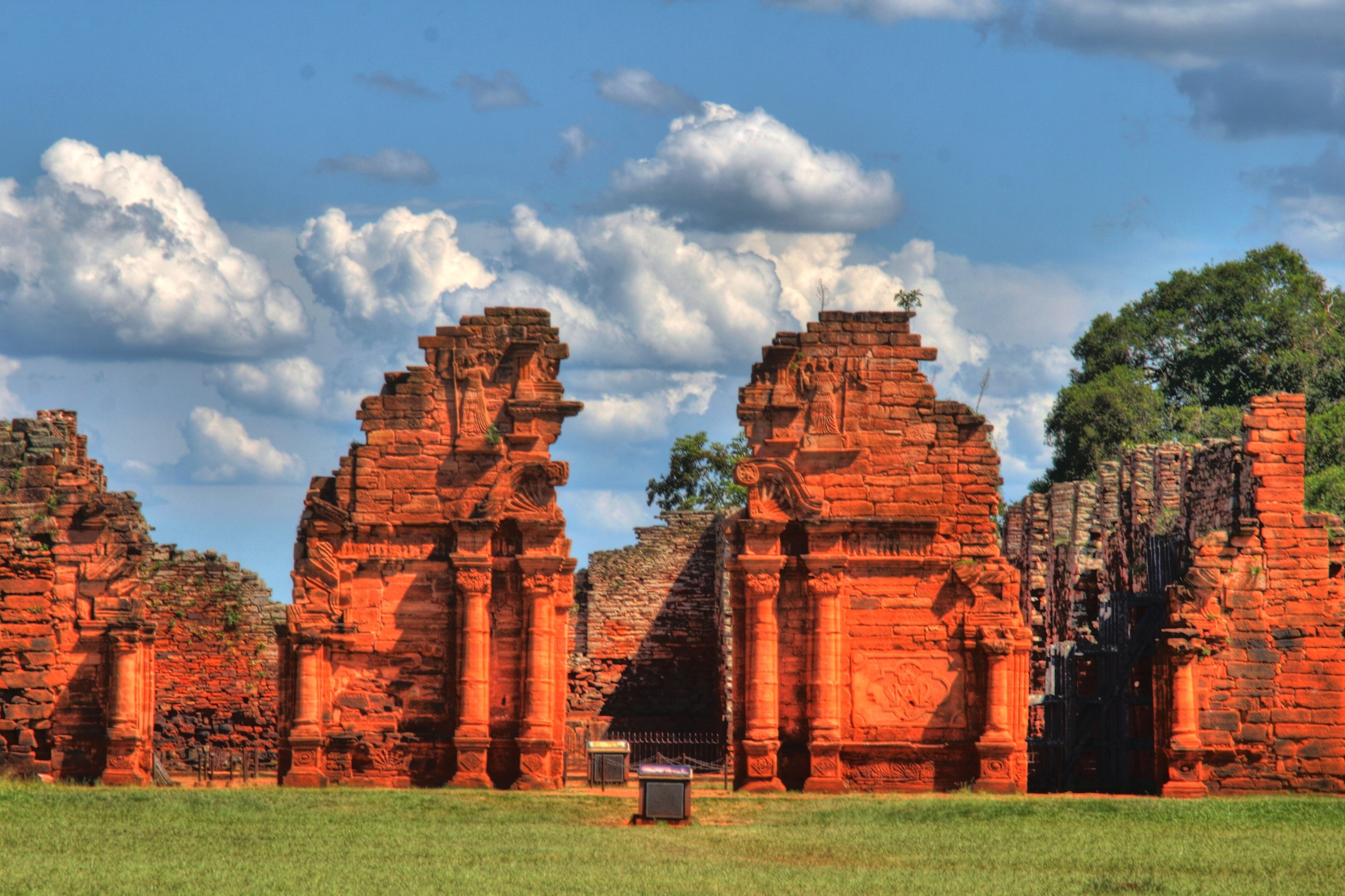
Mission of San Ignacio Miní

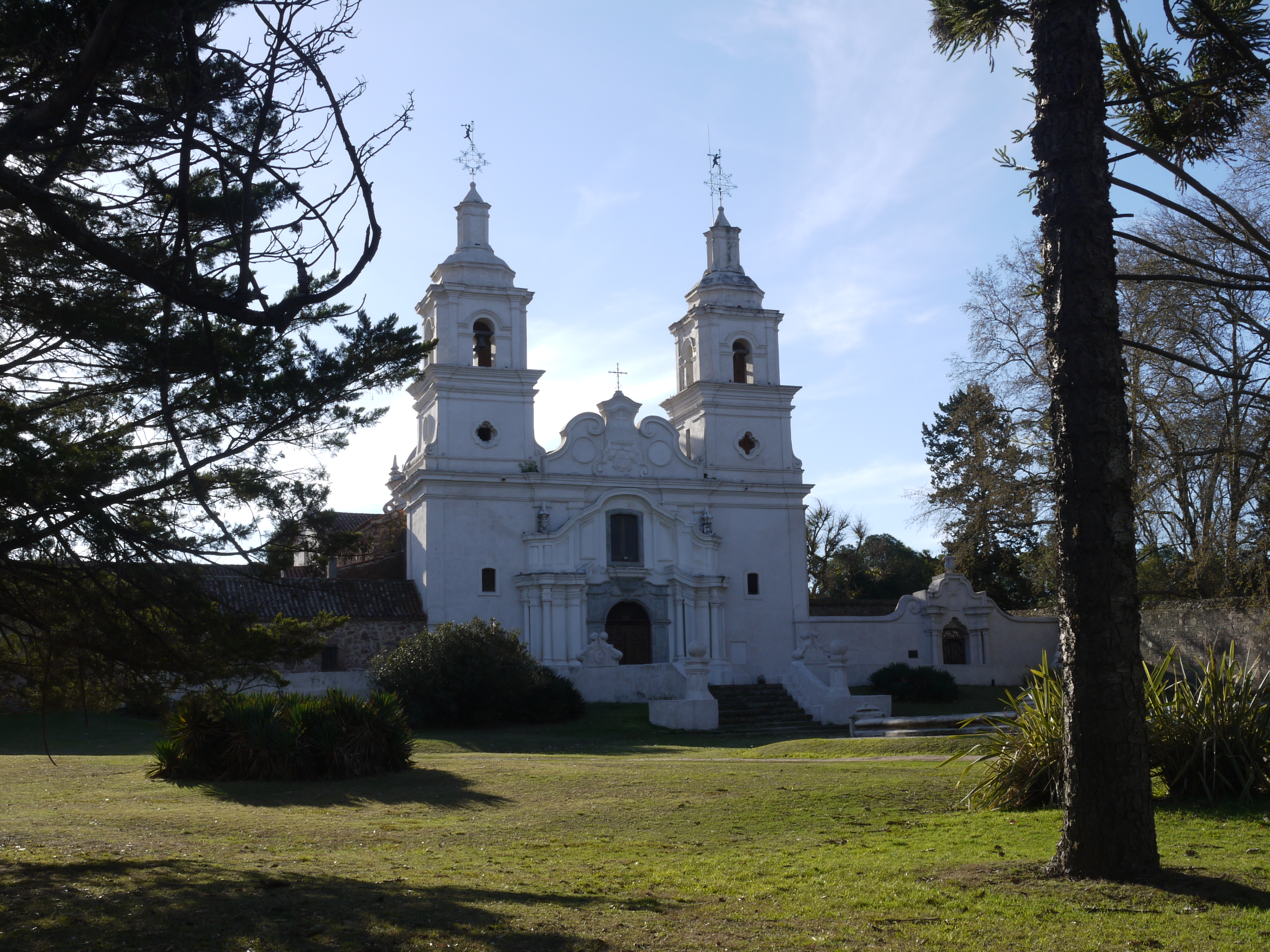
Estancia Santa Catalina

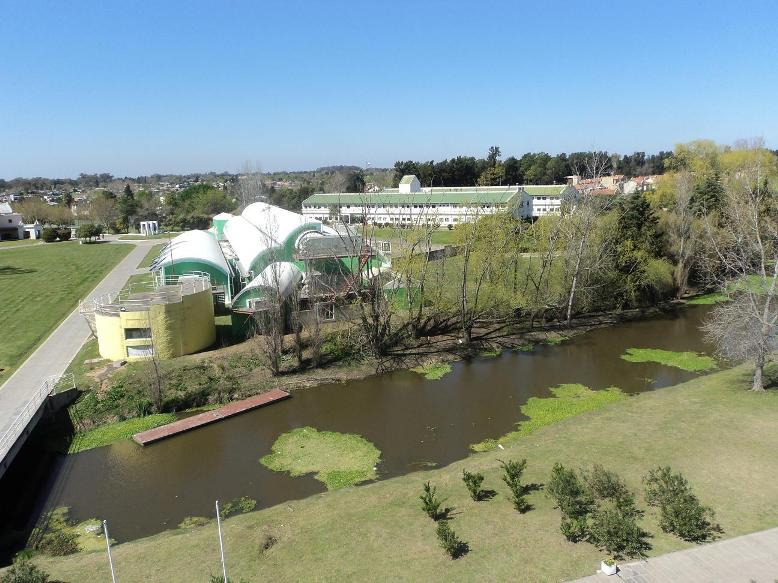
Universidad del Salvador, Buenos Aires

- Jesuit College on the "Illuminated Block" (Manzana de las Luces) in Buenos Aires (1608–1767), now Colegio Nacional de Buenos Aires, Faculty of Law of University of Buenos Aires, and Church of Saint Ignatius
- Collegium Maximum on the "Jesuit Block" (Manzana Jesuitica) in Córdoba (1610–1767), now National University of Córdoba, Colegio Nacional de Monserrat, and Lourdes Chapel
- 17th-century Jesuit reductions in Misiones Province:
  - Mission of Nuestra Señora de Loreto (1610–1767)
  - Mission of Nuestra Señora de la Inmaculada Concepción del Ibitiracuá (1619–1767)
  - Mission of Corpus Christi (1622–1767, with interruptions)
  - Mission of Santa María la Mayor (1626–1767)
  - Mission of Nuestra Señora de la Candelaria (1627–1665)
  - Mission of San Francisco Javier (1629–1767)
  - Mission of Nuestra Señora de la Asunción de Acaraguá y Mbororé (1630–1767)
  - Mission of San Carlos Borromeo (1631–1767)
  - Mission of los Santos Apóstoles San Pedro y San Pablo (1632–1767, with interruptions)
  - Mission of Santo Tomé Apóstol (1632–1767, with interruptions)
  - Mission of Nuestra Señora de Santa Ana (1633–1767)
  - Mission of San José de Itacuá (1633–1767, with interruptions)
  - Mission of los Santos Mártires del Japón (1639–1767, with interruptions)
  - Mission of San Ignacio Miní (1696–1767)
- Jesuit estancias around Córdoba:
  - Estancia Jesuítica Caroya (1616–1767)
  - Estancia Jesús María (1618–1767)
  - Estancia Jesuítica Santa Catalina (1622–1767)
  - Estancia Alta Gracia (1643–1767)
  - Estancia Jesuítica Santa Catalina (1683–1767)
  - Estancia Jesuítica La Candelaria (1683–1767)
  - Estancia del Rosario de Santa Gertrudis (1720–1767)
  - Estancia Jesuítica San Ignacio (1726–1767)
- Reducción de Yapeyú in Yapeyú, Corrientes (1627–1767)
- Mission of Nahuel Huapi in Patagonia (1670–1767, with interruptions)
- Misiones jesuitas del Sur in Southern Buenos Aires Province (1740–1753)
- San Fernando del Río Negro at Resistencia, Chaco (1750–1767)
- Colegio del Salvador in Buenos Aires (since 1868)
- Facultades de Filosofía y Teología de San Miguel near Buenos Aires (since 1918); initially in Santa Fe, moved to San Miguel in 1923
  - Centro Loyola (since 1931)
- Colegio Máximo de San José in Buenos Aires (since 1931)
- Catholic University in Córdoba (since 1956)
- Biblioteca del Colegio Máximo de San Miguel in Córdoba (since 2017)
- Universidad del Salvador in Buenos Aires (since 1958)

=== Belize ===
- St. Peter Claver Catholic parish in Punta Gorda (since 1862)
- St. John's College in Belize City (since 1887)
- St. Martin de Porres Church in Belize City (since 1968)

=== Bolivia ===
College in Sucre

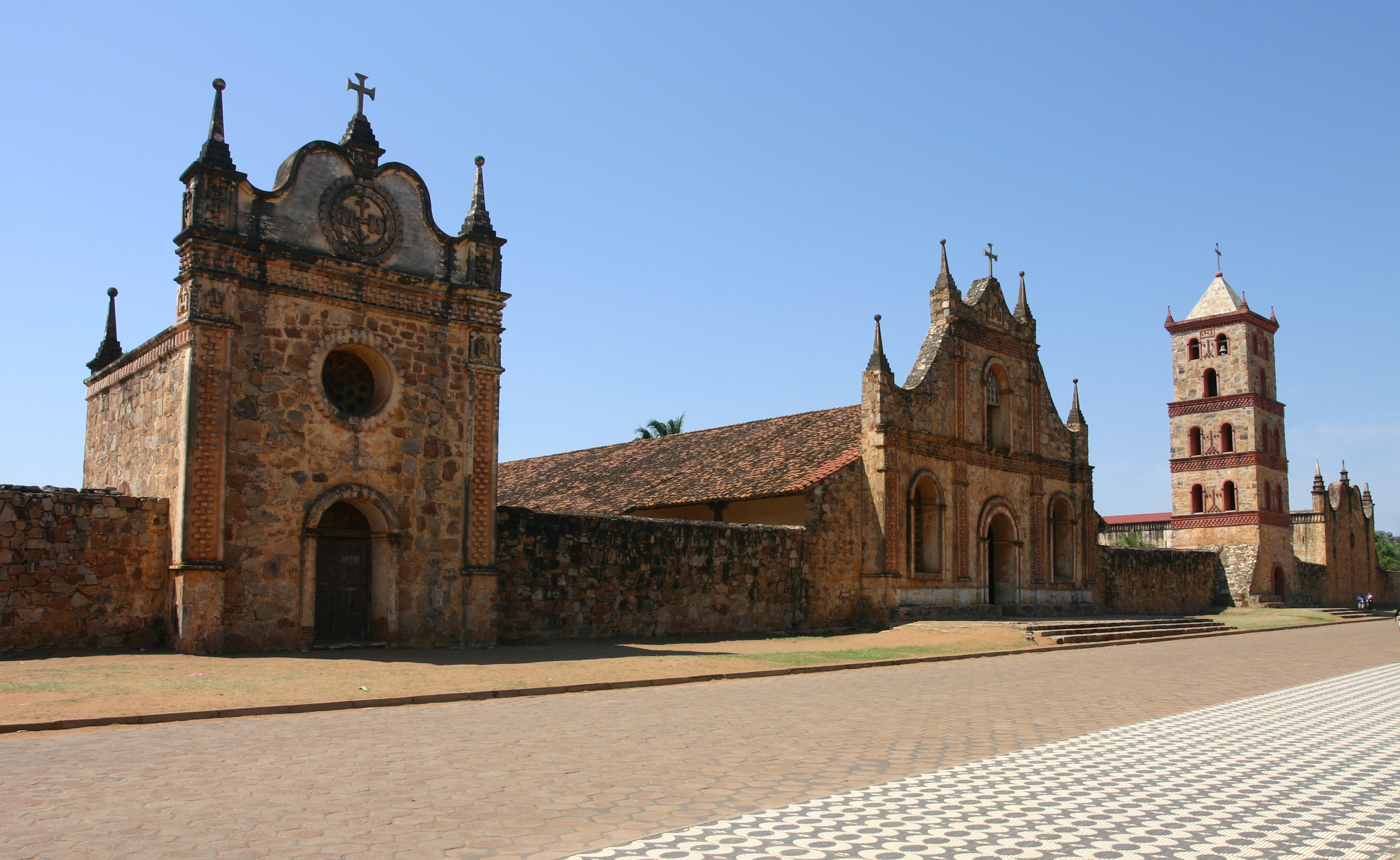
San José de Chiquitos

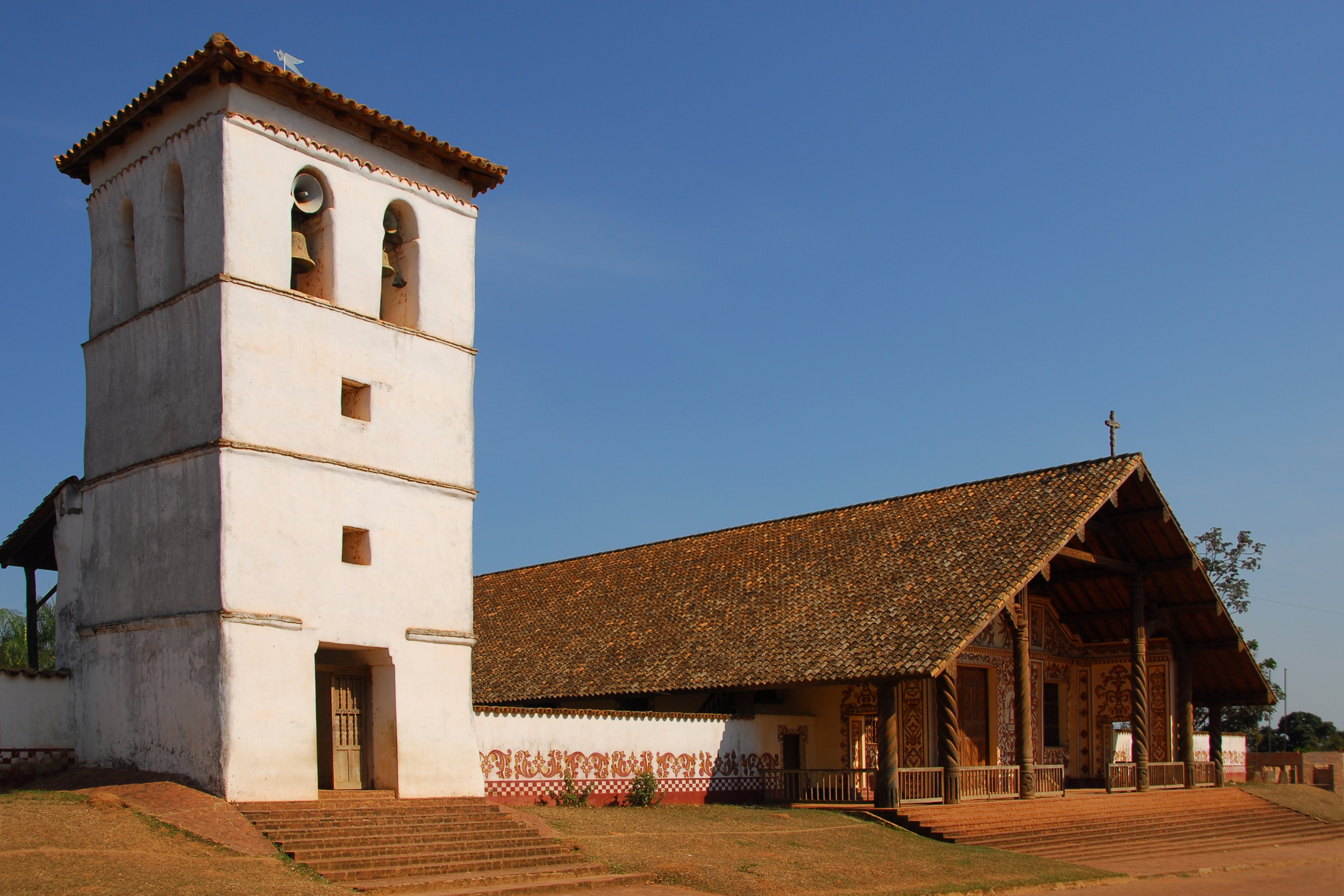
San Miguel de Velasco

- Jesuit college in Potosí (1577–1767), now 1 April School and Torre de la Compañía
- Jesuit college in La Plata, now Sucre (1621–1767), now University of Saint Francis Xavier, Church of Saint Michael and Casa de la Libertad
- Jesuit Missions of Chiquitos in Santa Cruz Department (dates refer to the establishment on the present location; see also the list of missions):
  - Mission of San José de Chiquitos (1698–1767)
  - Mission of San Javier (1708–1767)
  - Mission of San Rafael de Velasco (1719–1767)
  - Mission of San Miguel de Velasco (1721–1767)
  - Mission of the Immaculate Conception in Concepción (1722–1767)
  - Mission of Santa Ana de Velasco (1755–1767)
  - Mission of San Ignacio de Velasco
  - Mission of San Ignacio de Zamucos (1724–1745)
  - Mission of Santo Corazón
  - Mission of Santiago de Chiquitos
  - Mission of San Juan Bautista
- Jesuit Missions of Moxos in Beni Department
  - Jesuit college in Trinidad (1686–1767), now Apostolic Vicariate of El Beni and Cathedral of the Holy Trinity
  - Loreto Mission
  - San Ignacio de Moxos Mission
  - San Javier Mission
  - Santos Reyes Mission
  - Exaltación Mission
  - San Joaquín Mission
  - Santa Ana del Yacuma Mission
  - Santa Magdalena
  - Jesuit mission of San Borja (1693–1767)
- Jesuit college in Tarija (1690–1767), now Colegio Nacional San Luis and Cathedral of Saint Bernard
- Colegio San Calixto in La Paz (since 1882)
- Colegio del Sagrado Corazón, Sucre (since 1912)
- Radio Fides in La Paz (since 1939)
- Colegio San Ignacio, La Paz (since 1963)
- Loyola Cultural Action Foundation in Sucre (since 1966)
- Center for Research and Promotion of Farmers in La Paz (since 1970)
- John XXIII College, Cochabamba (since 1971)
- Centre for Research and Popular Service in Oruro, Bolivia (since 1984)
- Luis Espinal Higher Institute of Philosophy and Humanities in Cochabamba (since 2003)

=== Brazil ===
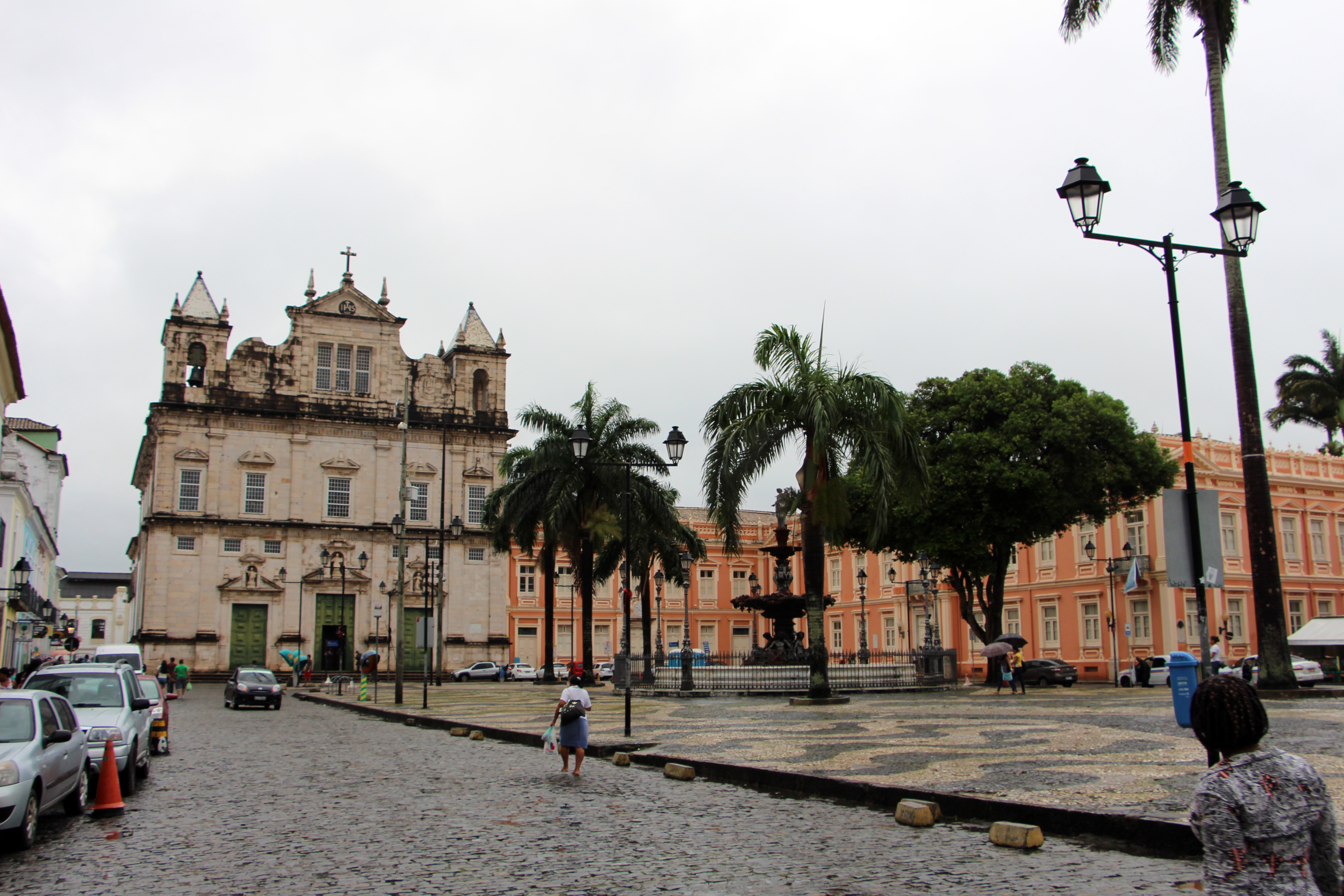
College in Salvador, Bahia

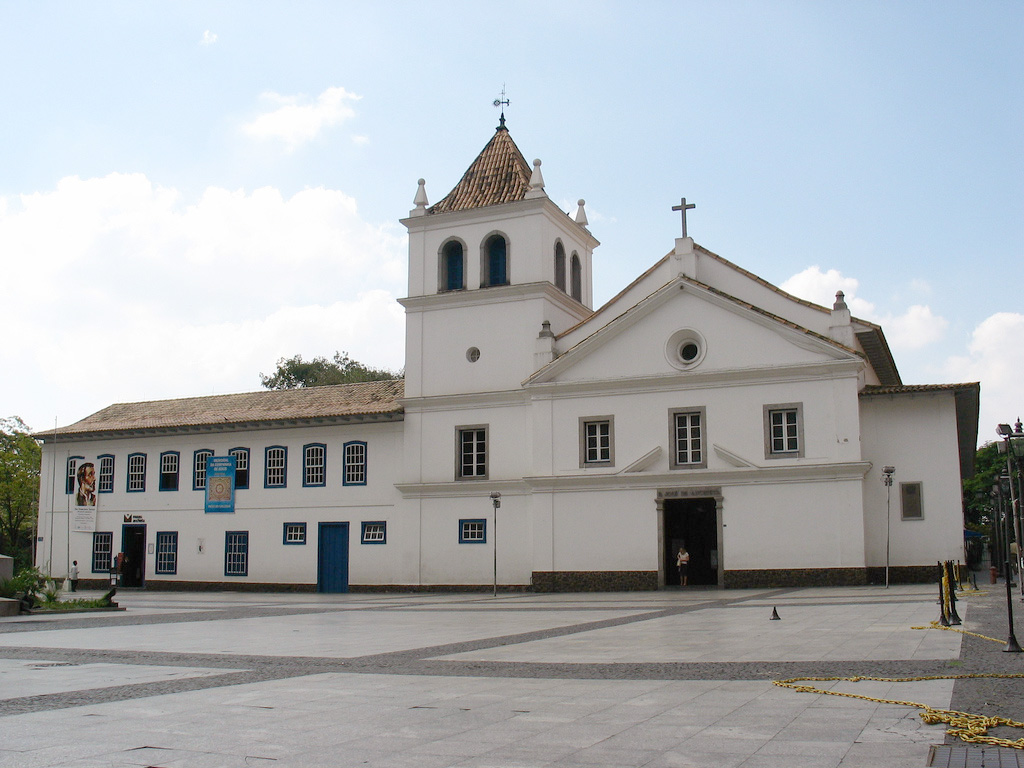
College in São Paulo

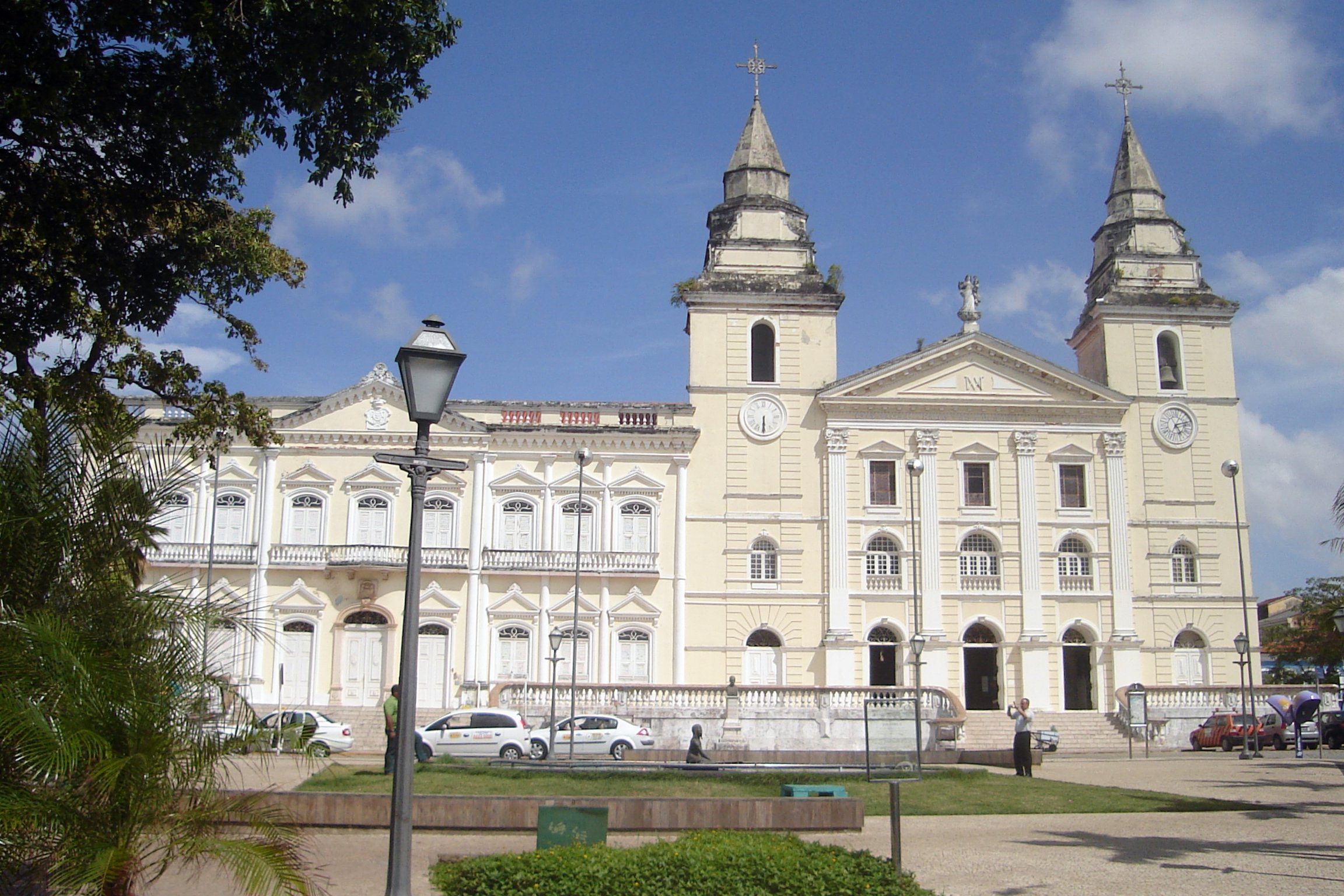
College in São Luís, Maranhão

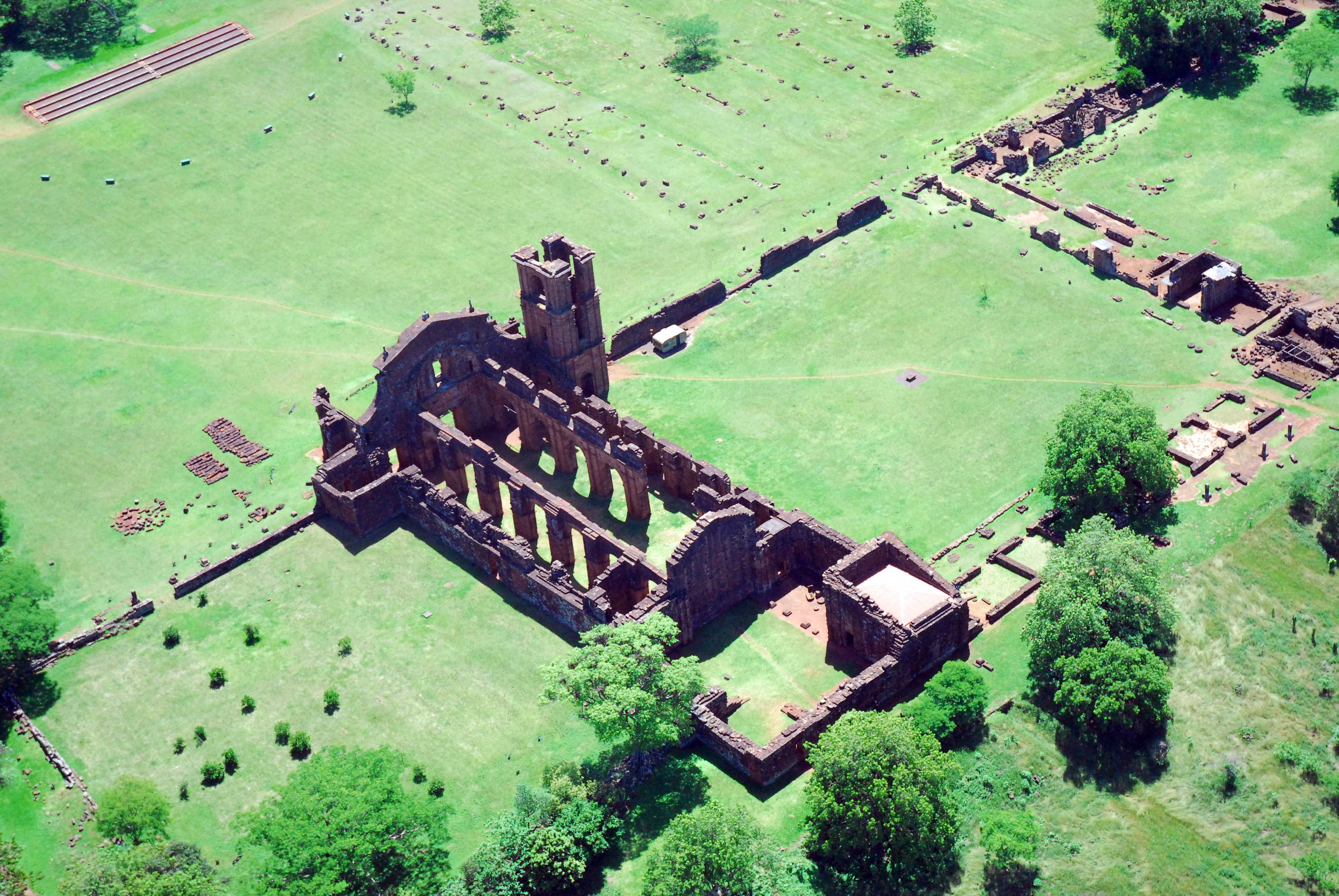
Mission of São Miguel

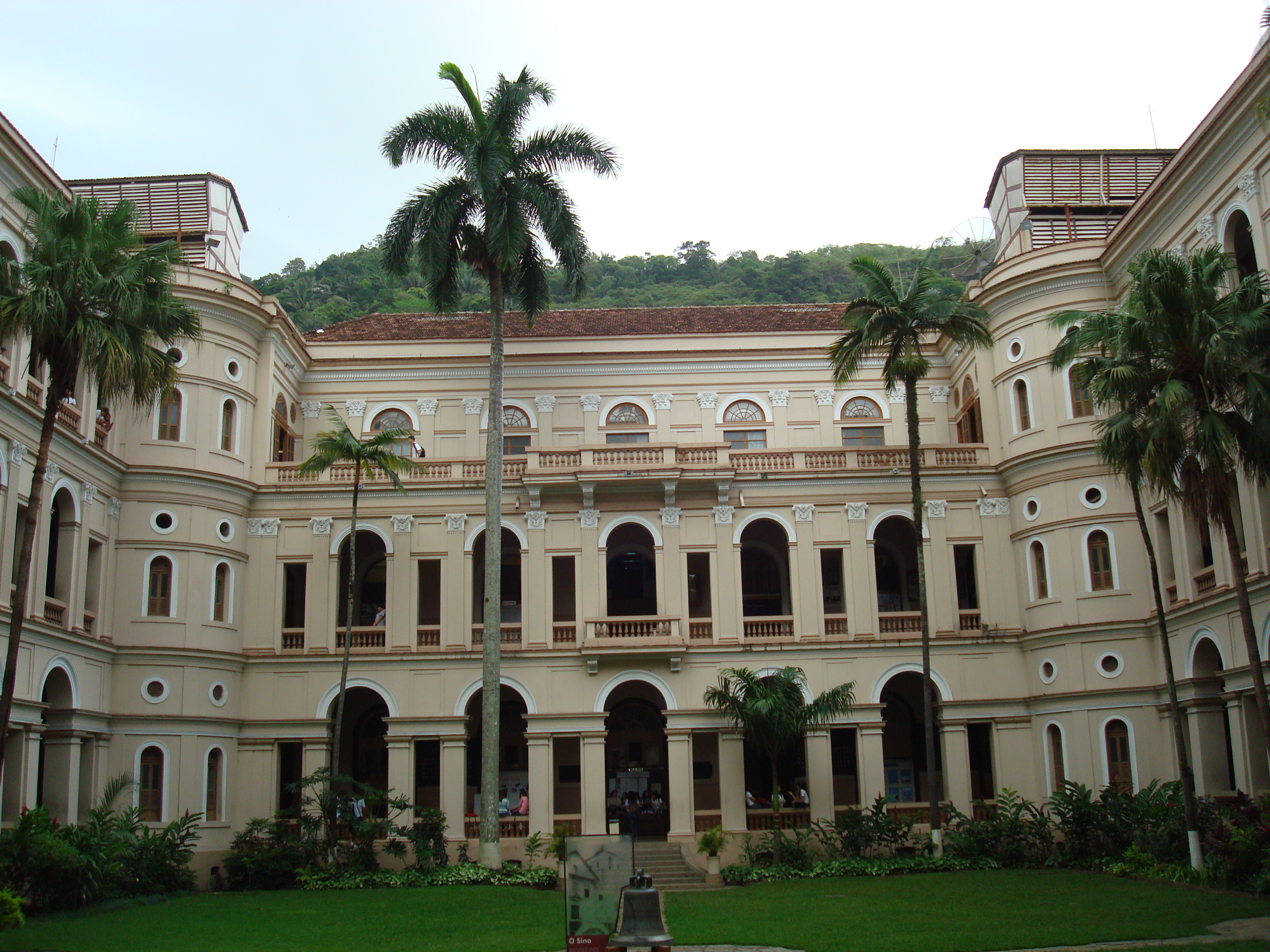
Saint Ignatius College, Rio de Janeiro

- Jesuit college in Vitória, Espírito Santo (1551–1759), now Anchieta Palace
- Jesuit college facing Terreiro de Jesus in Salvador, Bahia (1553–1759), its former chapel now the Cathedral Basilica of Salvador and the Faculty of Medicine of Bahia built on the remains of the school
- Pátio do Colégio in São Paulo dos Campos de Piratininga, São Paulo (1554–1640, 1653–1759 and since 1953), now Anchieta Museum and Basilica of Joseph of Anchieta
- Chapel of Saint Michael Archangel in São Miguel Arcanjo, São Paulo (1560–1759)
- Jesuit college in Olinda, Pernambuco (1565–1759), now Church of Our Lady of Grace
- Jesuit college on Castle Hill in Rio de Janeiro (1567–1759); the entire hill, including the college's remains, was leveled in the 1920s
- Sanctuary of Saint Joseph of Anchieta in Anchieta, Espírito Santo (1579–1759 and since 1928)
- Jesuit village of Aldeia de Carapicuíba in Carapicuíba (1580–1759)
- Tejupeba House and the Chapel of the Colégio Sugar Plantation, a Jesuit slave-holding plantation (ca. 1601)
- Reduction of Nuestra Señora de Loreto del Pirapó in Northern Paraná (1610–1631)
- Jesuit college in São Luís, Maranhão (1622–1759), nolouis w Corregedor-Geral da Justiça do Maranhão and Catedral de São Luís
- Church of Our Lady of the Assumption in Viçosa do Ceará (1665–1759)
- Misiones Orientales in Rio Grande do Sul, developed from the late 17th century until the Guaraní War (see also: sculpture of the Brazilian Oriental Missions)
  - Mission of São Miguel (1687–1754)
  - Mission of São Nicolau (1687–1754)
  - Mission of São Lourenço Mártir (1690–1754)
- Former Jesuit House of Prayer, Salvador (circa 1696)
  - Mission of São João Batista (1697–1754)
- Church of the Mother of God, Vigia (1734)
- St. Louis College in São Paulo (since 1867)
- Anchieta College in Nova Friburgo (since 1886)
- Anchieta College in Porto Alegre (since 1890)
- St. Ignatius College in Rio de Janeiro (since 1903)
- Saint Catherine College in Florianópolis (since 1905)
- Antonio Vieira College in Salvador, Bahia (since 1911)
- Diocesan College in Teresina (since 1925)
- St. Francis Xavier College in São Paulo (since 1926)
- Pontifical Catholic University in Rio de Janeiro (since 1941)
- Centro Universitário da FEI in São Bernardo do Campo near São Paulo (since 1941)
- Catholic University of Pernambuco in Recife (since 1943)
- Loyola College in Belo Horizonte (since 1943)
- St. Ignatius College in Fortaleza (since 1955)
- Jesuit College in Juiz de Fora, Minas Gerais (since 1956)
- College of Our Lady Mediatrix in Curitiba (since 1957)
- FMC Electronic Technical School in Santa Rita do Sapucaí, Minas Gerais (since 1963)
- St. Alphonsus Rodriguez School in Teresina (since 1963)
- Center for Studies and Social Action in Salvador, Bahia (since 1967)
- Unisinos University in São Leopoldo (since 1969)
- Jesuit School of Philosophy and Theology in Belo Horizonte (since 1982), initially founded in Nova Friburgo in 1941
- Padre Arrupe School in Teresina (since 2003)

=== Canada ===
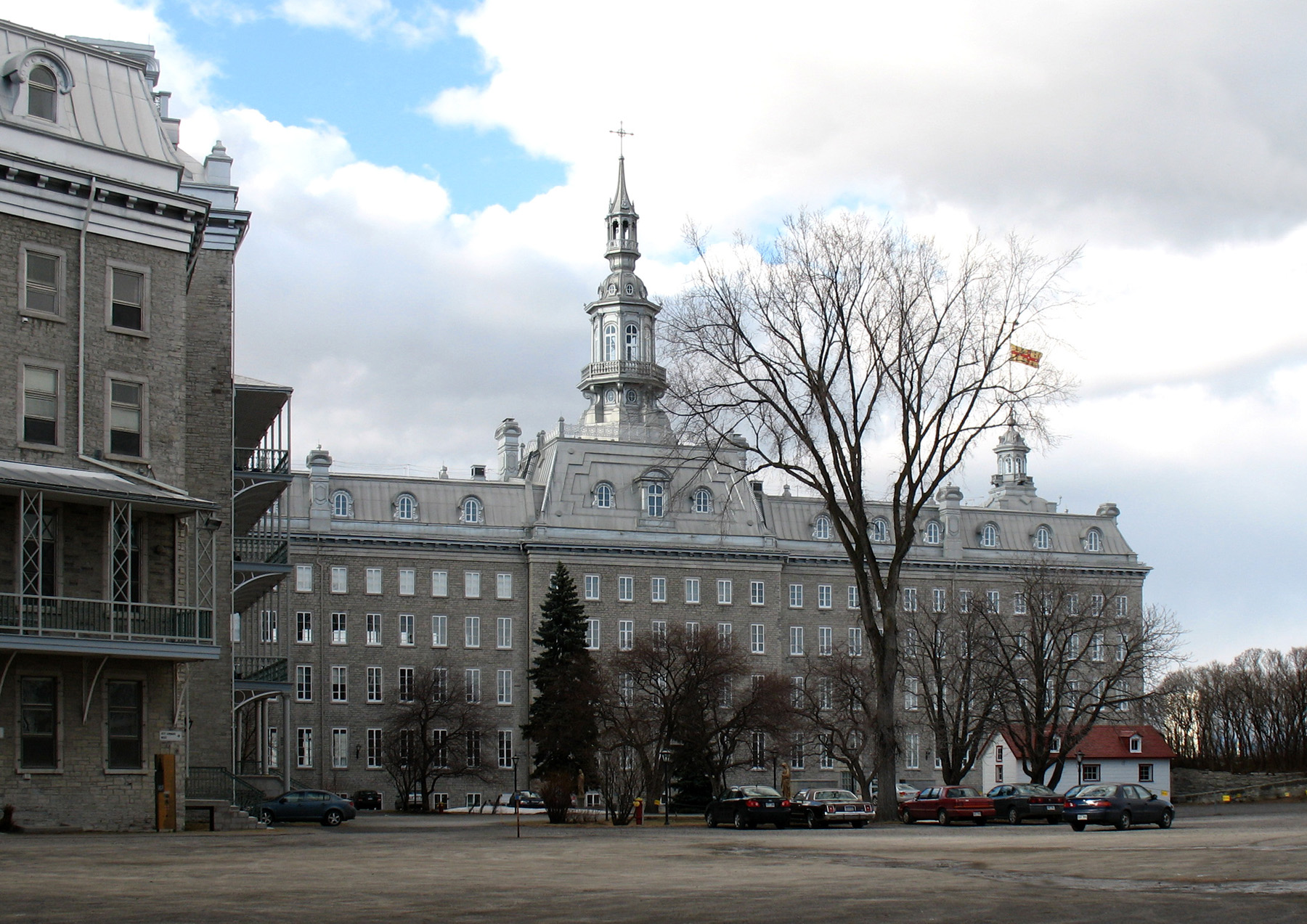
Grand séminaire, Quebec City

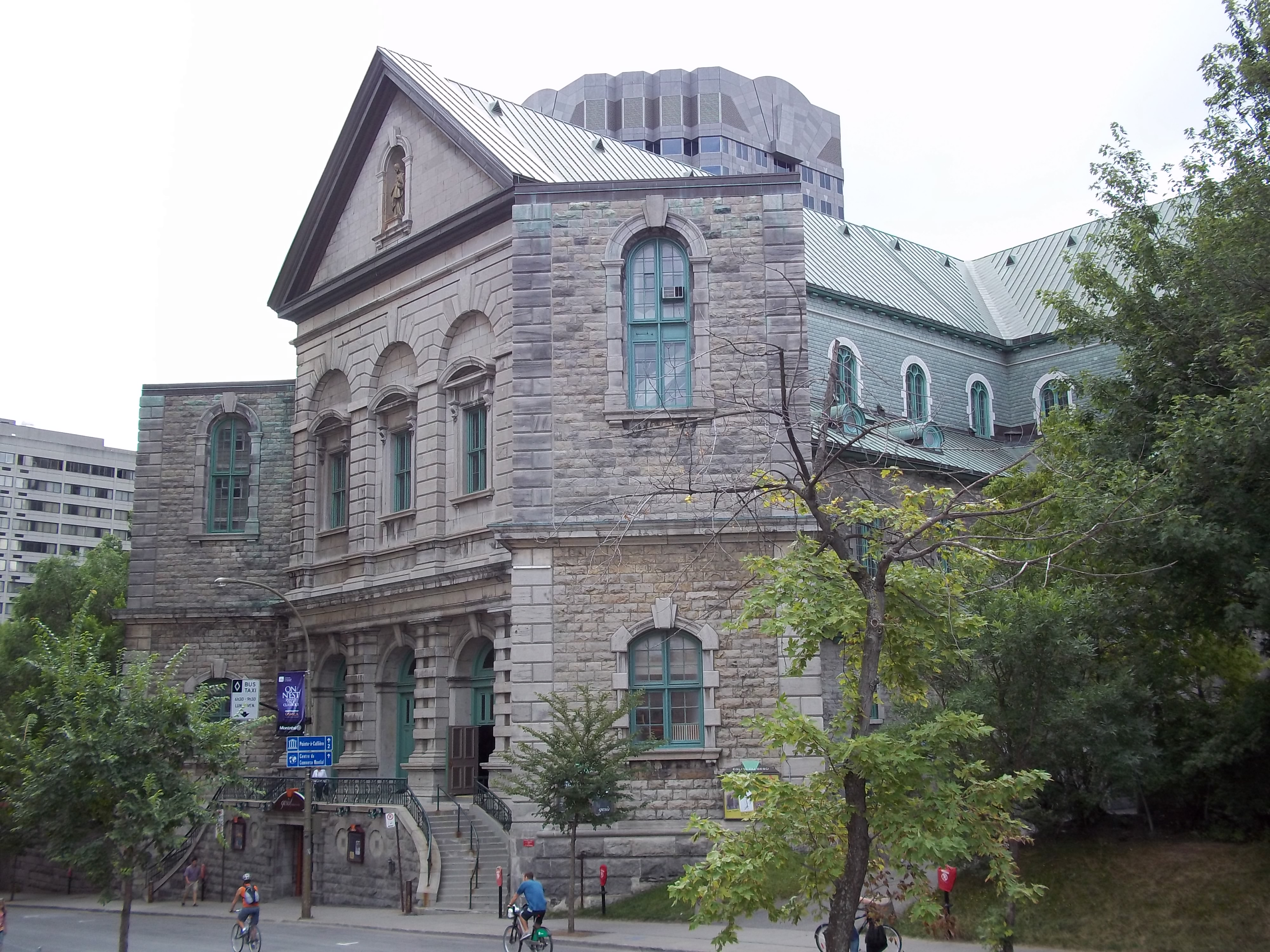
Church of the Gesù, Montreal

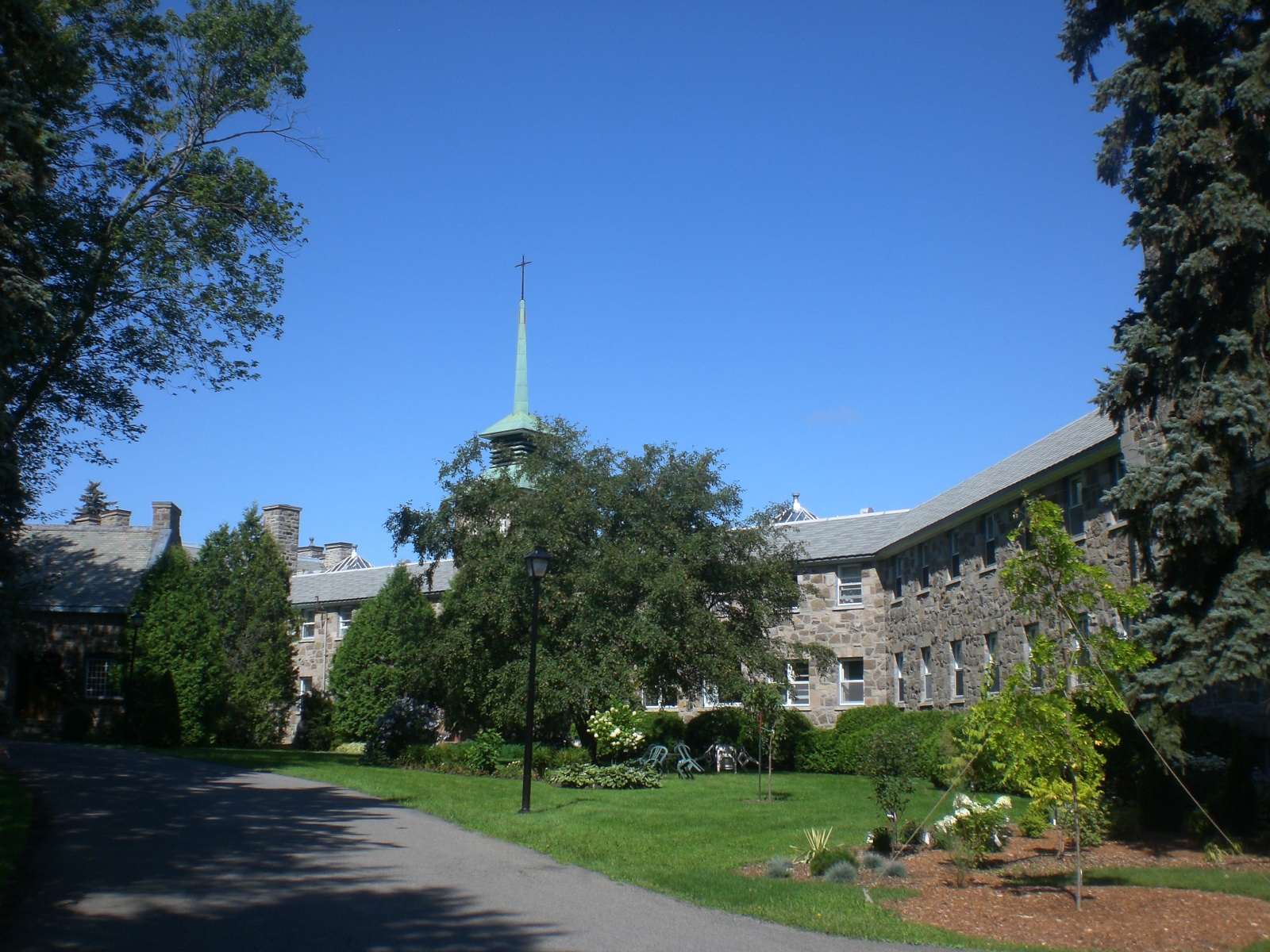
Villa Saint-Martin, Montreal

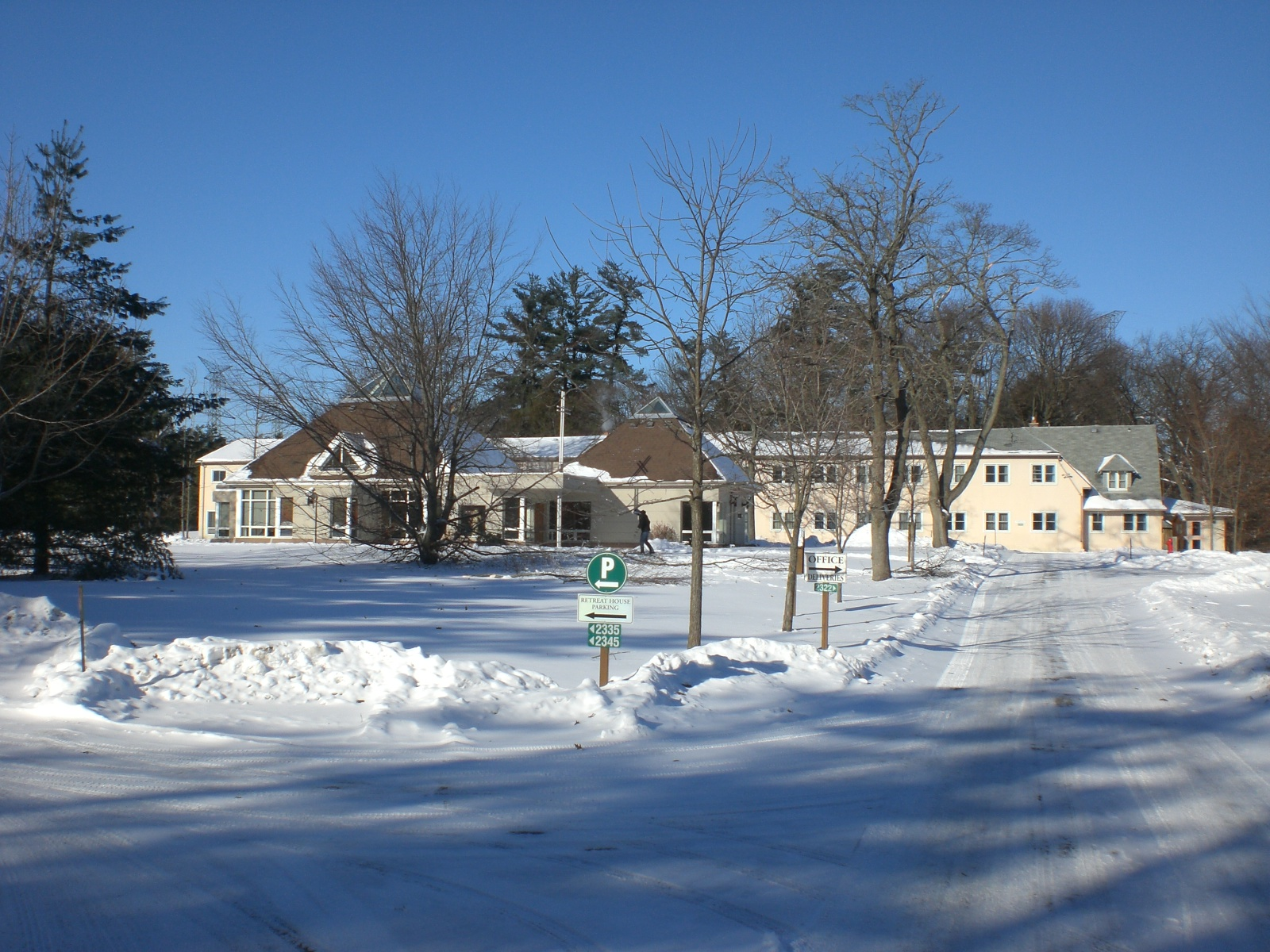
Manresa Centre, Pickering

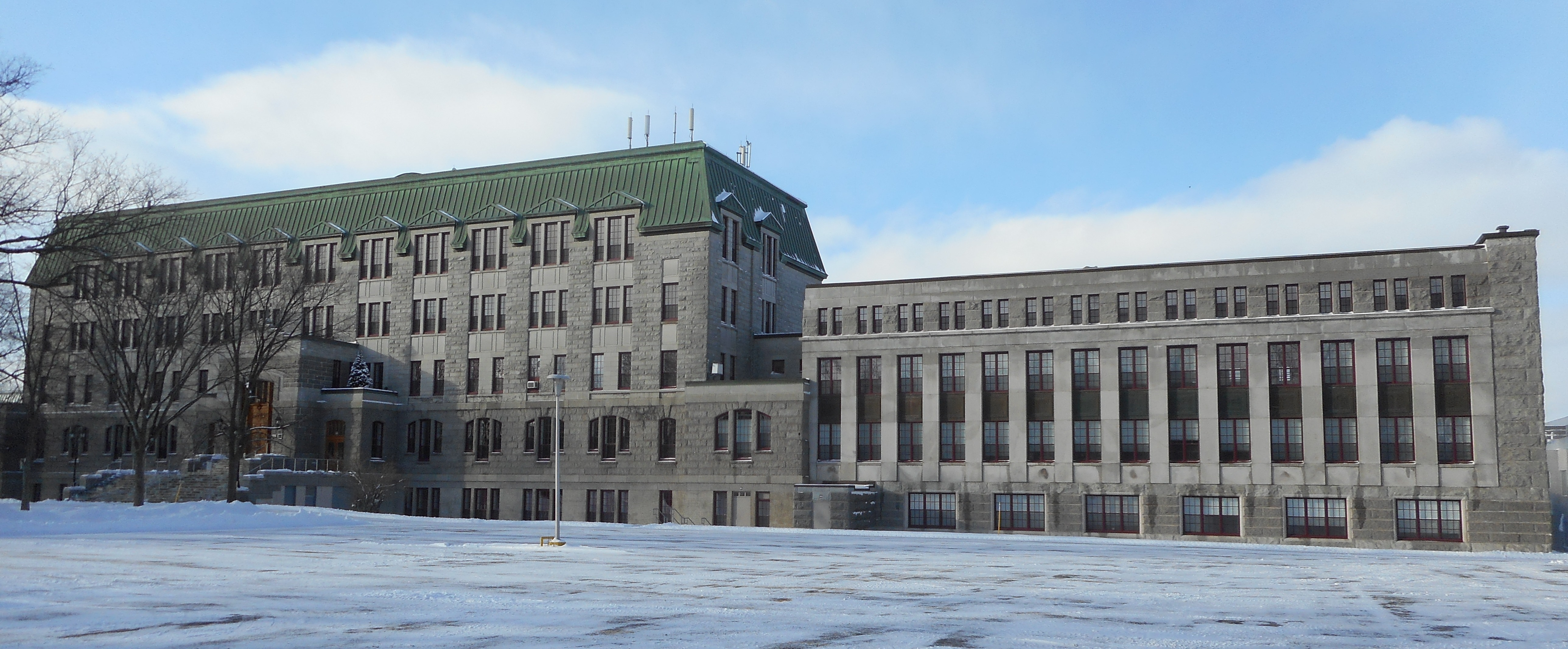
St Charles Garnier College, Quebec City

- Jesuit college in Quebec City (1635–1800)
  - The college buildings were demolished in 1878. It is now the site of the City Hall of Quebec City
  - Séminaire de Québec, created in 1637 as a boarding house for college's students
- Sainte-Marie among the Hurons mission near Midland, Ontario (1639–1649)
- Jesuit mission at Old Sandwich Town (1747-late 18th century)
- Jesuit Chapel in Quebec City (since 1818)
- Holy Cross Church, Wiikwemkoong in Northern Ontario (1844–1954)
- Mission jésuite Saint-Eugène auprès des indiens Kootenai near Cranbrook, British Columbia (1845–20th century)
- Jesuit mission in Walpole Island (1844–1850)
- Collège Sainte-Marie in Montreal (1848–1969)
  - The college was merged in 1969 to form Université du Québec à Montréal. Its buildings were demolished in 1975
  - The Church of the Gesù (Montreal), built 1864–1865, was preserved and renovated in 1983
- Saint Sylvesters Church in Red Rock Indian Band, Ontario (since 1852)
- St. Andrew's Church in Thunder Bay, Ontario (1872–1997)
- Villa Manresa, now Manresa Spirituality Centre in Quebec City (since 1891)
- Loyola College, originally the English-speaking program of Collège Sainte-Marie in Montréal, later merged into Concordia University (1896–1974)
- St. Ignatius Church in Winnipeg (since 1908), and St. Ignatius School since 1911
- Villa Saint Martin in Montreal (since 1910), since 1953 in the current building
- Ignatius Jesuit Centre in Guelph, Ontario (since 1913); Loyola House moved there from Glen Abbey in 1964
- Campion College in Regina, Saskatchewan (since 1917)
- Manresa Jesuit Spiritual Renewal Centre in Pickering, Ontario (since 1924)
- St. Charles Garnier College in Quebec City (since 1930)
- Regis College in Toronto (since 1930)
- St. Paul's College in Winnipeg (since 1933)
- Camp Ekon in Ontario (since 1937)
- Saint Mary's University in Halifax, Nova Scotia (1940–1970)
- Glen Abbey retreat and training center in Oakville, Ontario (1953–1963), now Glen Abbey Golf Course
- Gonzaga High School in St. John's, Newfoundland and Labrador (since 1962), and St. Pius X Church built in the 1970s
- Villa Loyola in Greater Sudbury, Ontario (since 1962)
- Brebeuf College School in Toronto (since 1963)
- Loyola High School in Montreal (since 1964), earlier part of Loyola College, and St. Ignatius of Loyola Church built in 1966
- Our Lady of Lourdes Church in Toronto (since 1969)
- Anishinabe Spiritual Centre in Espanola, Ontario (since 1972)
- Jesuit Forum for Social Faith and Justice in Toronto (since 1979)
- Centre justice et foi in Montreal (since 1983)
- Saint Bonaventure's College in St. John's (since 1999)
- Holy Rosary Church in Guelph (since 2001)
- St. Patrick's Church in Halifax (since 2005)
- St. Mark's Church in Vancouver (since 2007)

=== Chile ===
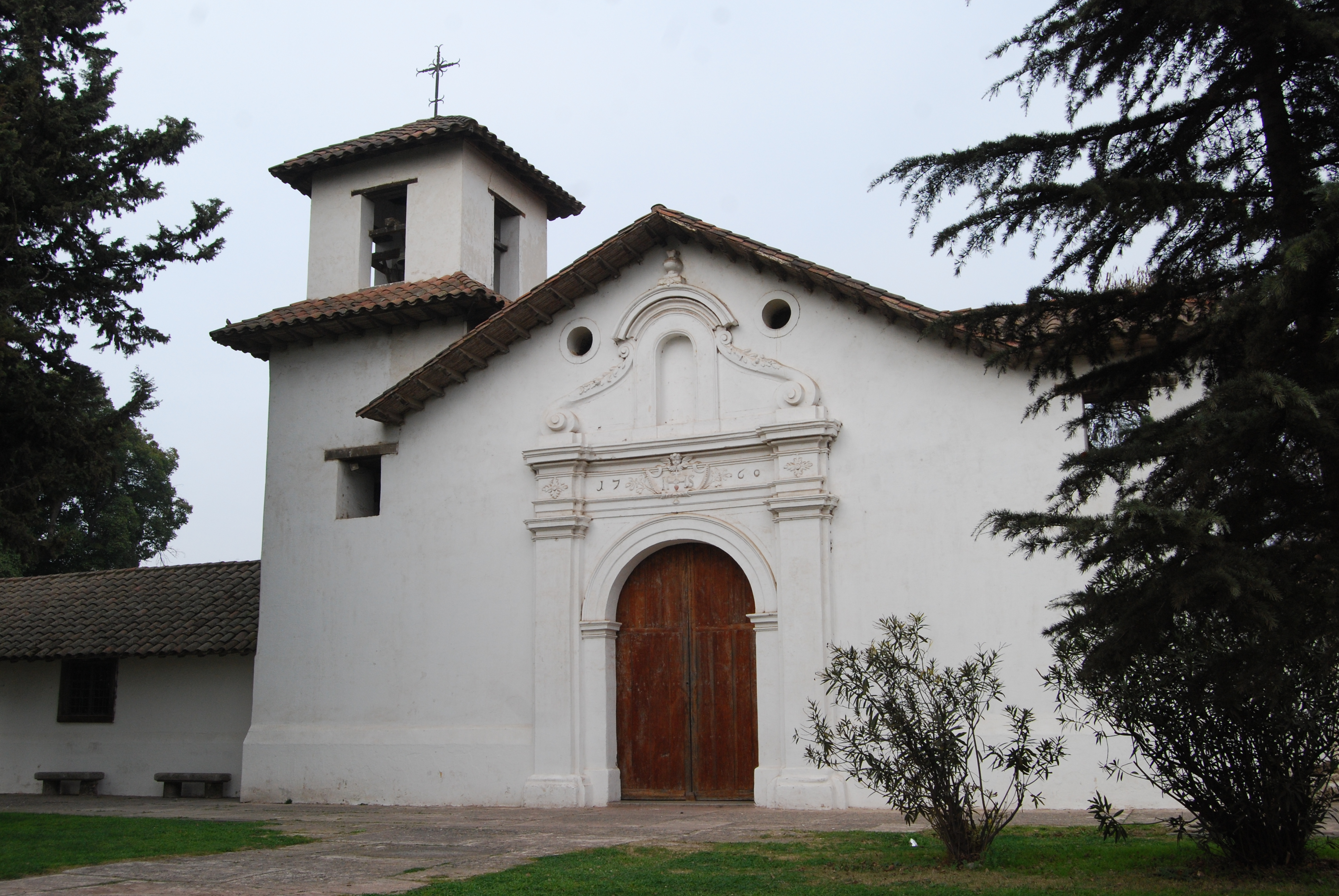
Church in Calera de Tango

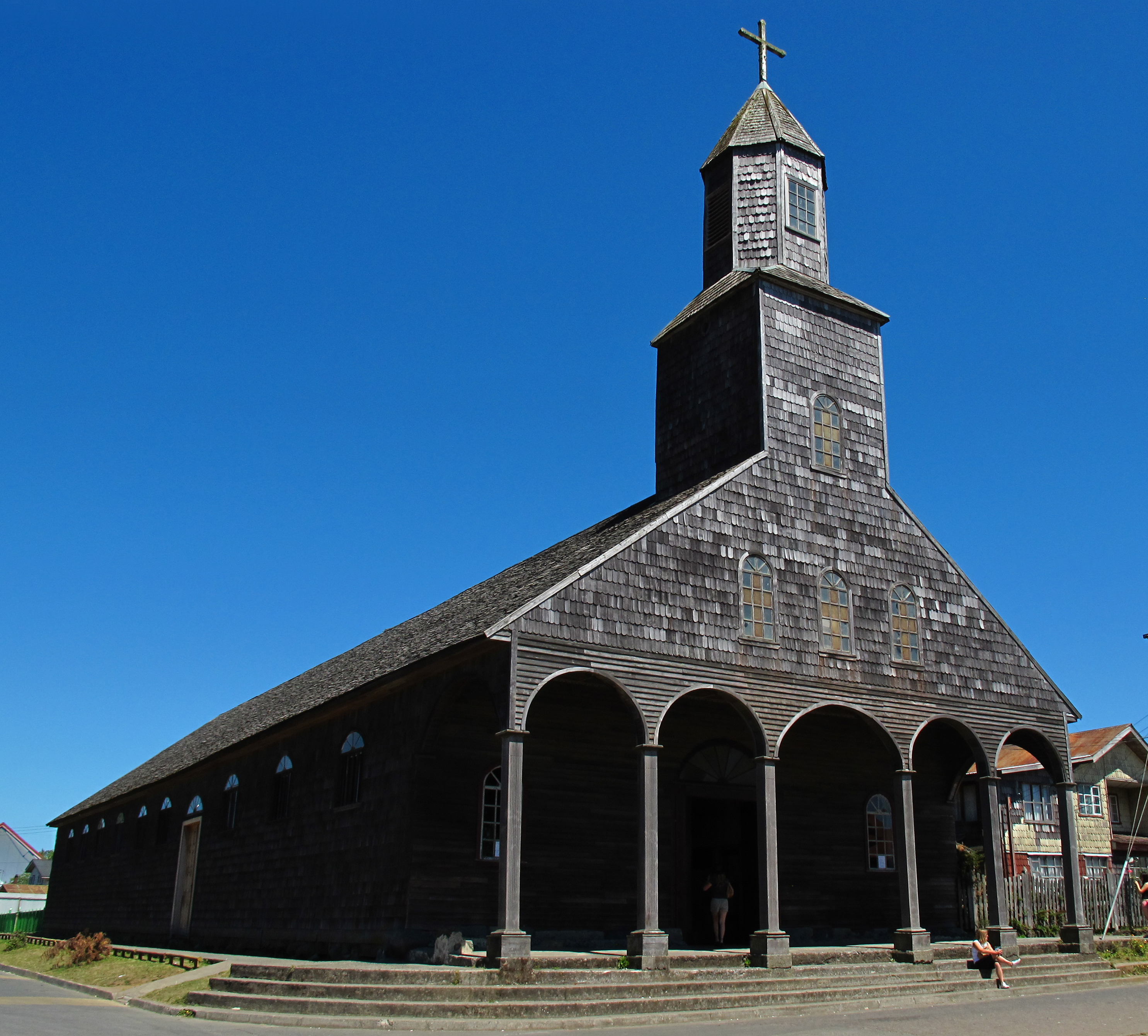
Church in Achao, Chiloé

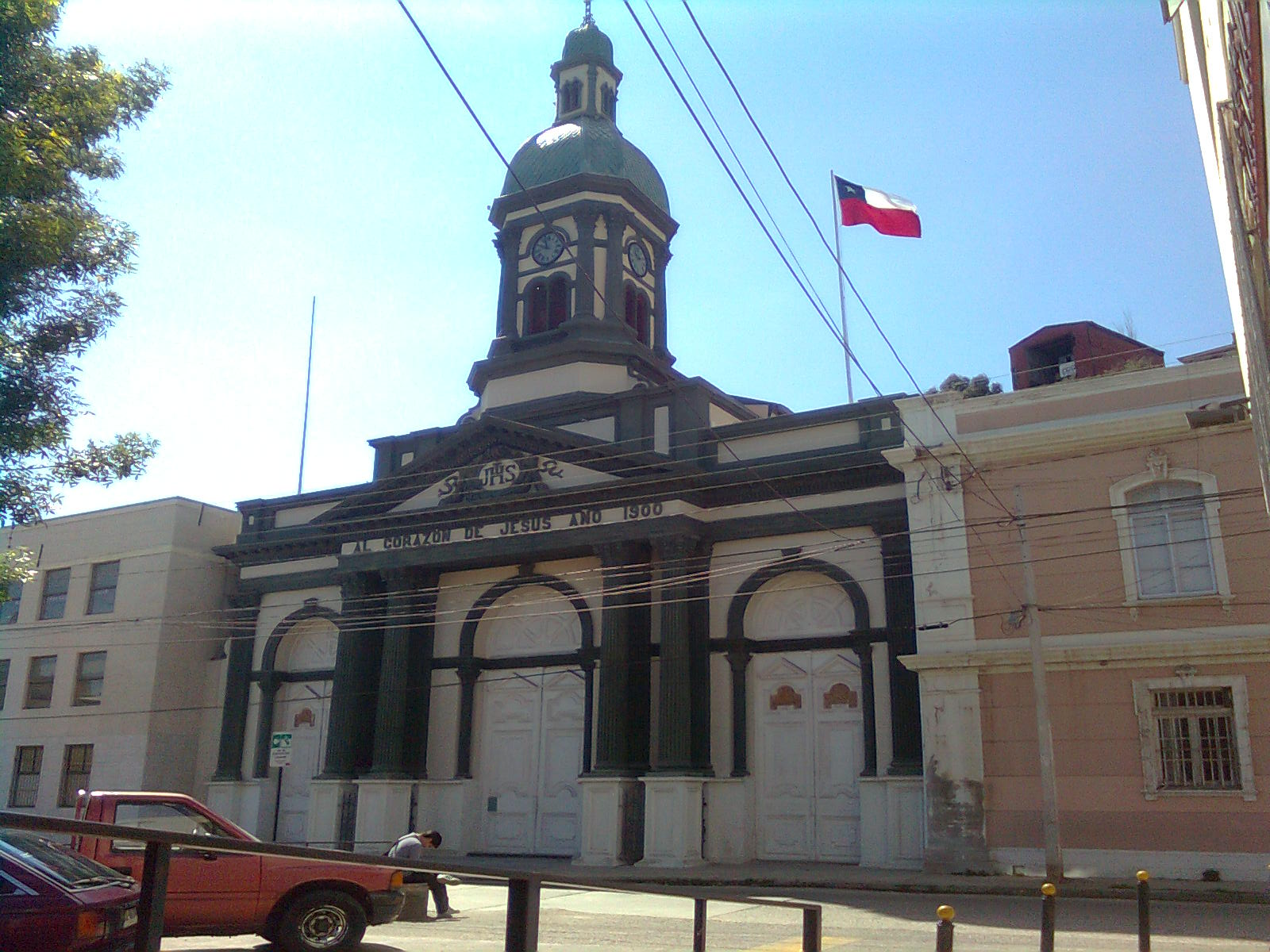
Church in Valparaíso

- Jesuit college in Santiago (1593–1767), on location which is now the gardens of the Former National Congress Building; the Church of the Jesuits was destroyed by fire in 1863
- Church of Quinchao in the Chiloé Archipelago (1605–1767)
- Jesuit college in Valparaíso (1659–1767), demolished in 1879
- Hacienda Calera de Tango in Calera de Tango (1685–1767)
- Church of Santa María de Loreto, Achao in the Chiloé Archipelago (1754–1767)
- Church of the Jesuits in Graneros (1758–1767)
- Mission of Río Bueno in Río Bueno (1767)
- Church of the Jesuits in Valparaíso (since 1852)
- St. Ignatius College in Santiago (since 1854)
- Iglesia de San Ignacio (Santiago de Chile) in Santiago (since 1867)
- St. Francis Xavier College in Puerto Montt (since 1859)
- Church of the Jesuit Fathers in Puerto Montt (since 1871)
- St. Ignatius El Bosque in Santiago (since 1935)
- St. Aloysius College in Antofagasta (since 1936)
- Hogar de Cristo in Santiago (since 1944)
- University of Valparaíso in Valparaíso (1951–1963)
- St. Matthew College in Osorno (since 1959)
- Infocap in Santiago (since 1984)
- Alberto Hurtado University in Santiago (since 1997)
- Misión Jesuita Mapuche

=== Colombia ===
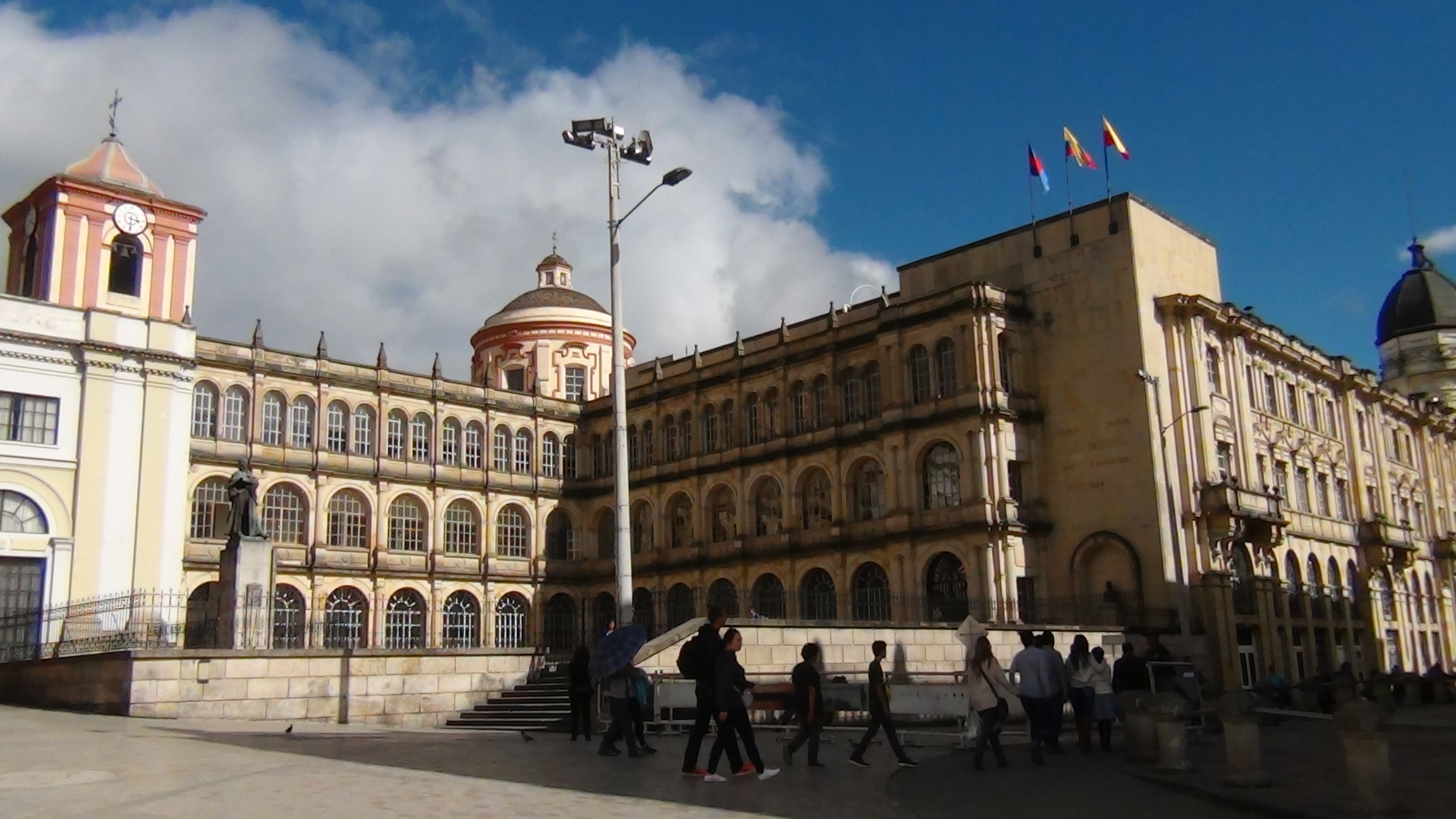
College in Bogotá

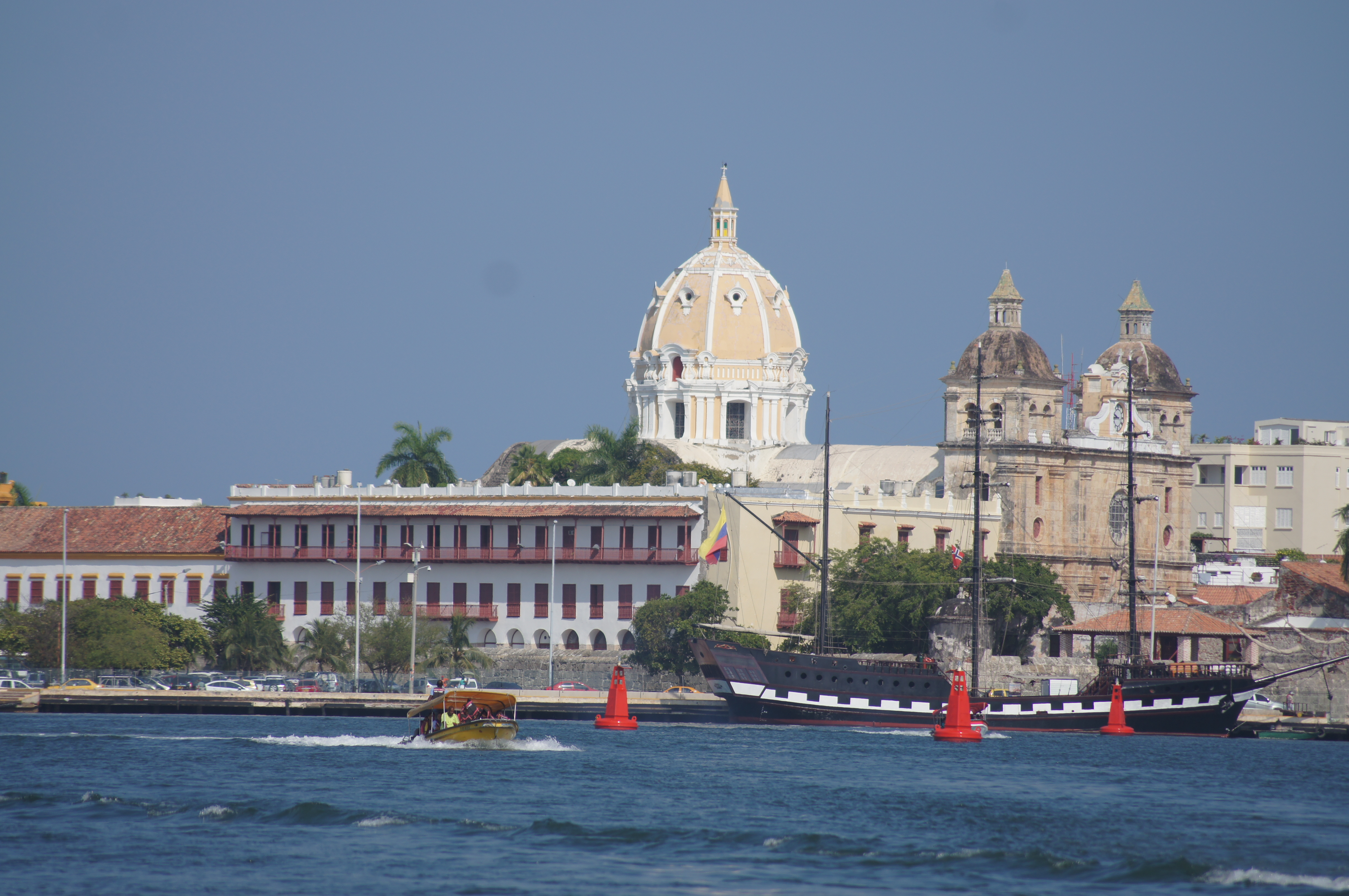
College in Cartagena

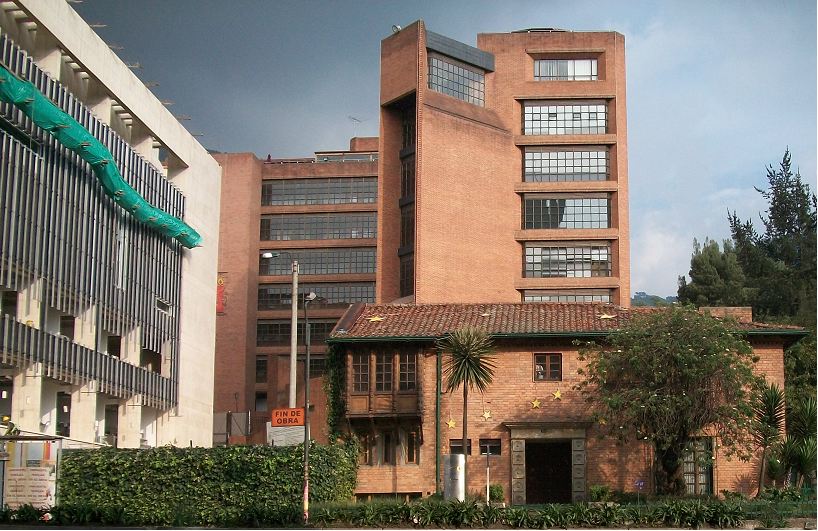
Xavierian University, Bogotá

- Collegium Maximum in Bogotá (1604–1767, 1844–1850, 1859–1861, and since 1887), now Museo Colonial and Church of Saint Ignatius
- Jesuit college in Cartagena (1604–1767), now Museo Naval del Caribe and Church of Saint Peter Claver, the latter under Jesuit management again since 1896
- Church of Saint Ignatius in Tunja (1620–1767)
- Church of San José in Popayán (1702–1767)
- St. Ignatius Loyola College in Medellín (since 1885), located at Claustro San Ignacio until 1957, and Church of Saint Ignatius
- Colegio San Pedro Claver in Bucaramanga (since 1886)
- St. Joseph College in Barranquilla (since 1918)
- St. Francis Xavier College in Pasto (since 1925)
- Pontifical Xavierian University in Bogotá (since 1930), with a second campus in Cali since 1970
- Berchmans College in Cali (since 1933)
- Colegio San Bartolomé La Merced in Bogotá (since 1941)
- St. Aloysius Gonzaga College in Manizales (since 1954)
- Fe y Alegría in Bogotá (since 1955)
- Instituto Mayor Campesino in Buga, Valle del Cauca (since 1962)
- CINEP / Peace Program in Bogotá (since 1972)
- Gimnasio Los Caobos in Chía near Bogotá (since 1991)

=== Cuba ===
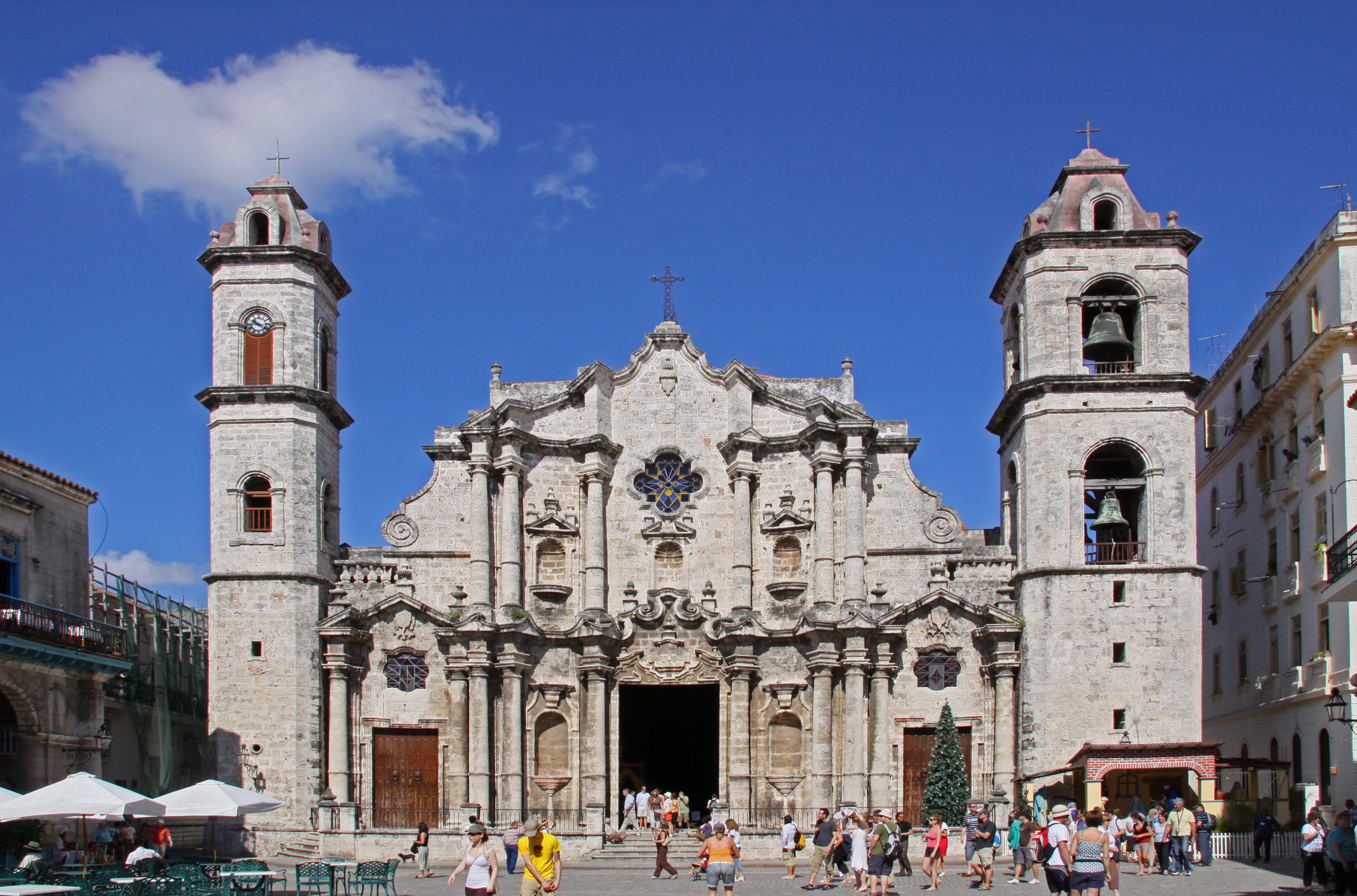
College church, Havana

- Jesuit college of San José in Havana (1721–1767), now Feria de la Artesania and Havana Cathedral
- Colegio de Belén in Havana (1854–1961), now Instituto Técnico Militar
- Colegio de Nuestra Señora de Monserrat in Cienfuegos (1879–1942)
- College of Dolores in Santiago de Cuba (1913–1961)

=== Dominican Republic ===
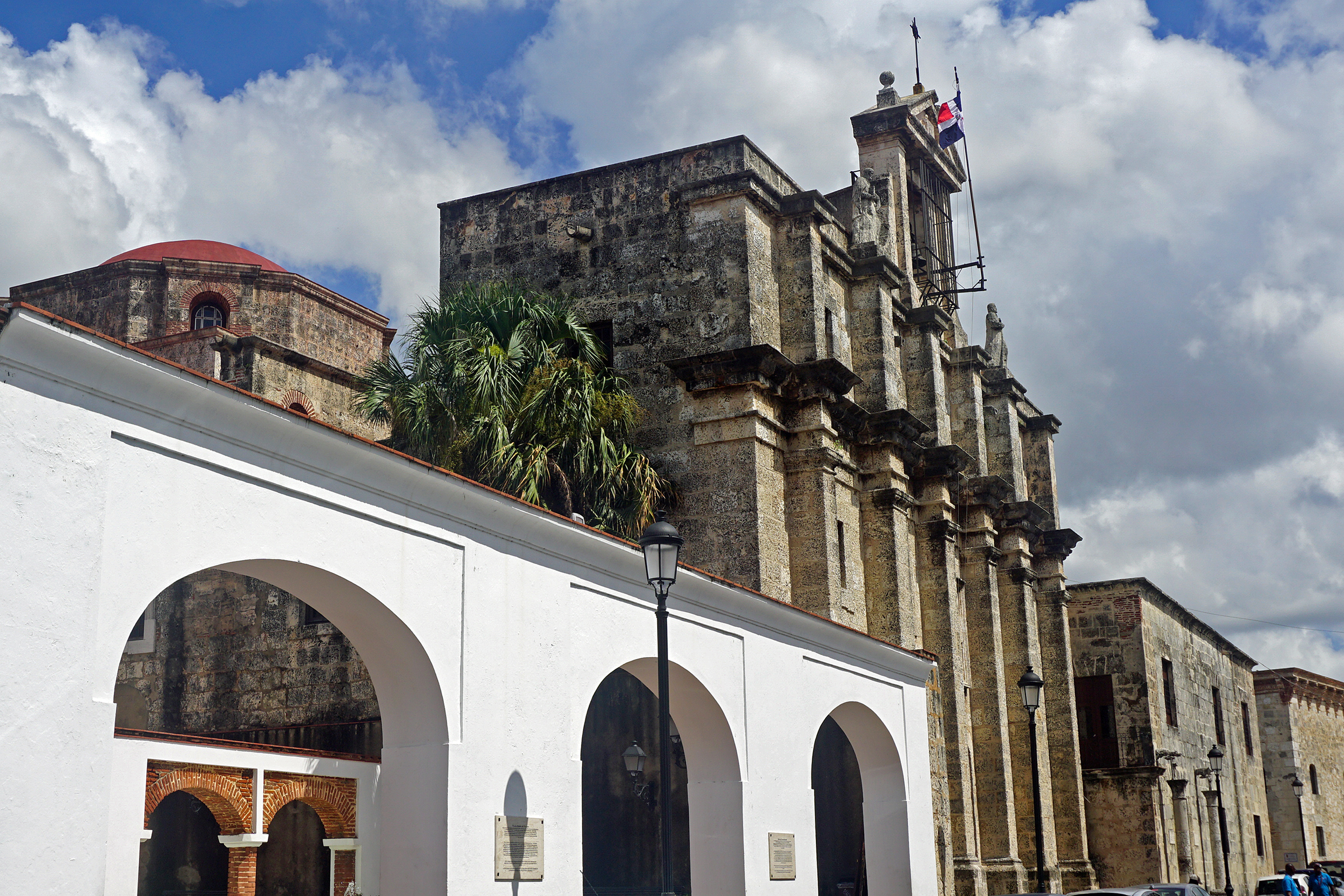
College in Santo Domingo

- Jesuit college of Saint Ignatius in Santo Domingo (1683–1767), now Centro de Altos Estudios Humanísticos y del Idioma Español and National Pantheon of the Dominican Republic
- Loyola Polytechnic Institute in San Cristóbal (since 1952)
- Pedro Francisco Bono Institute in Santo Domingo (since 1985)

=== Ecuador ===
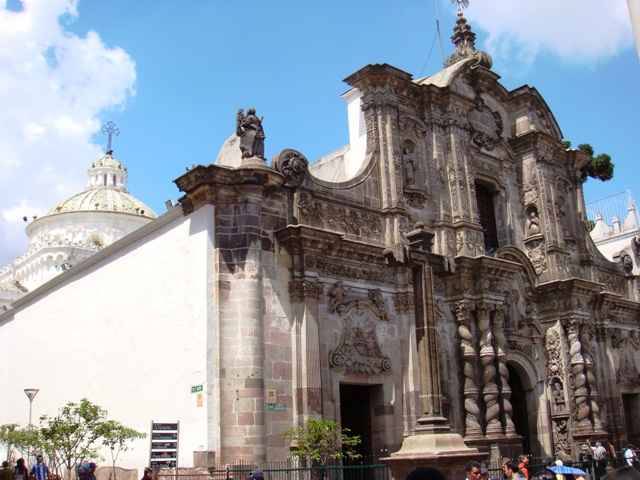
College church, Quito

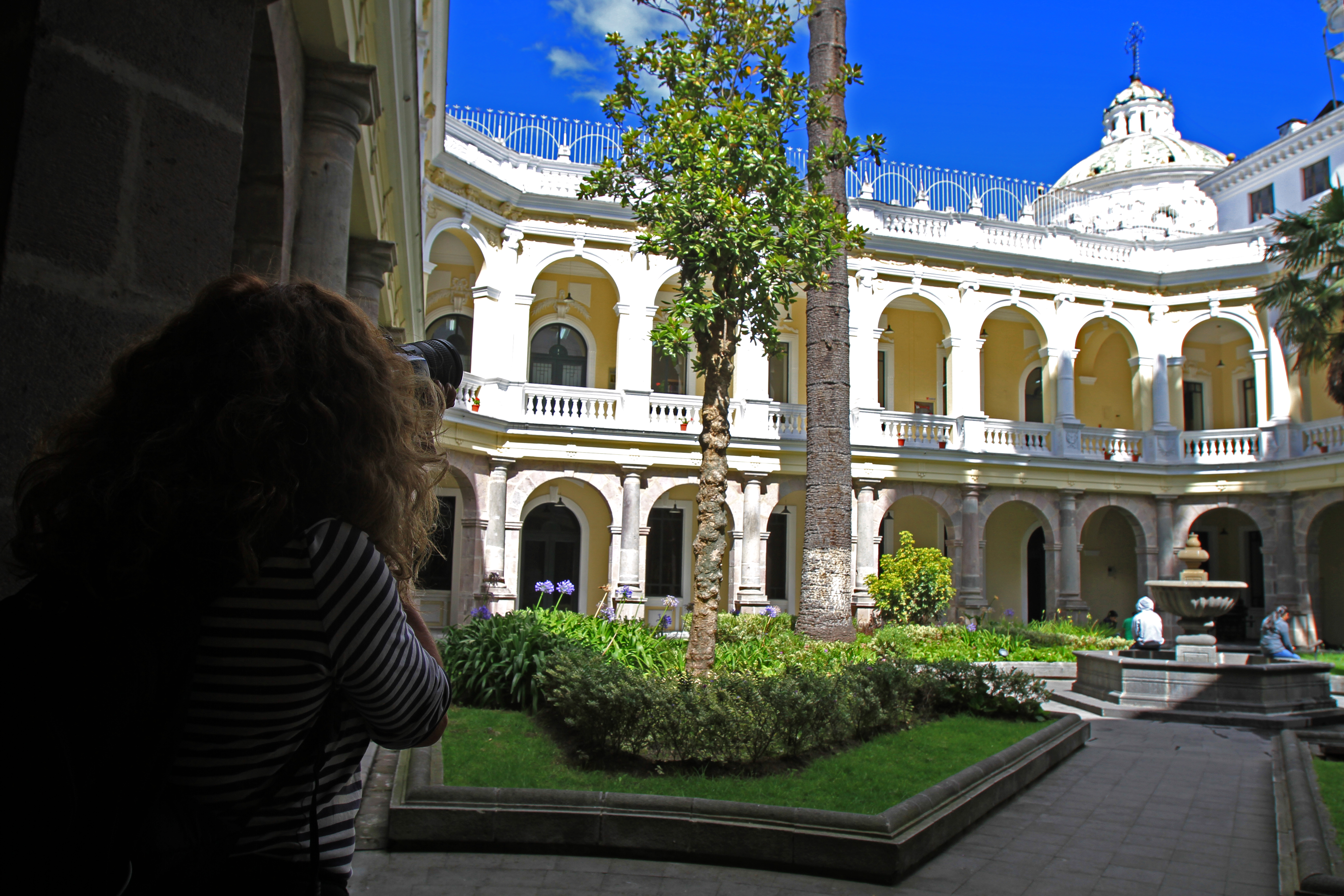
College patio, Quito

- Jesuit college in Quito (1605–1767), now Metropolitan Cultural Center and Church of the Jesuits; precursor to Central University of Ecuador
- Jesuit college in Cuenca (1638–1767)
- School of Saint Philip Neri in Riobamba (since 1838)
- St. Gabriel College in Quito (since 1862)
- Christ the King School in Portoviejo (since 1930)
- Borja School in Cuenca (since 1937)
- Pontifical Catholic University of Ecuador in Quito (since 1946)
- Unidad Educativa Javier in Guayaquil (since 1956)
- Working Boy Center in Quito (since 1964)
- Hogar de Cristo in Guayaquil (since 1971)

=== France (overseas) ===
- Habitation Loyola in French Guiana (1668–1764), now an archaeological park

=== El Salvador ===
- Externado San José in San Salvador (since 1921)
- Central American University in San Salvador (since 1965)

=== Guatemala ===
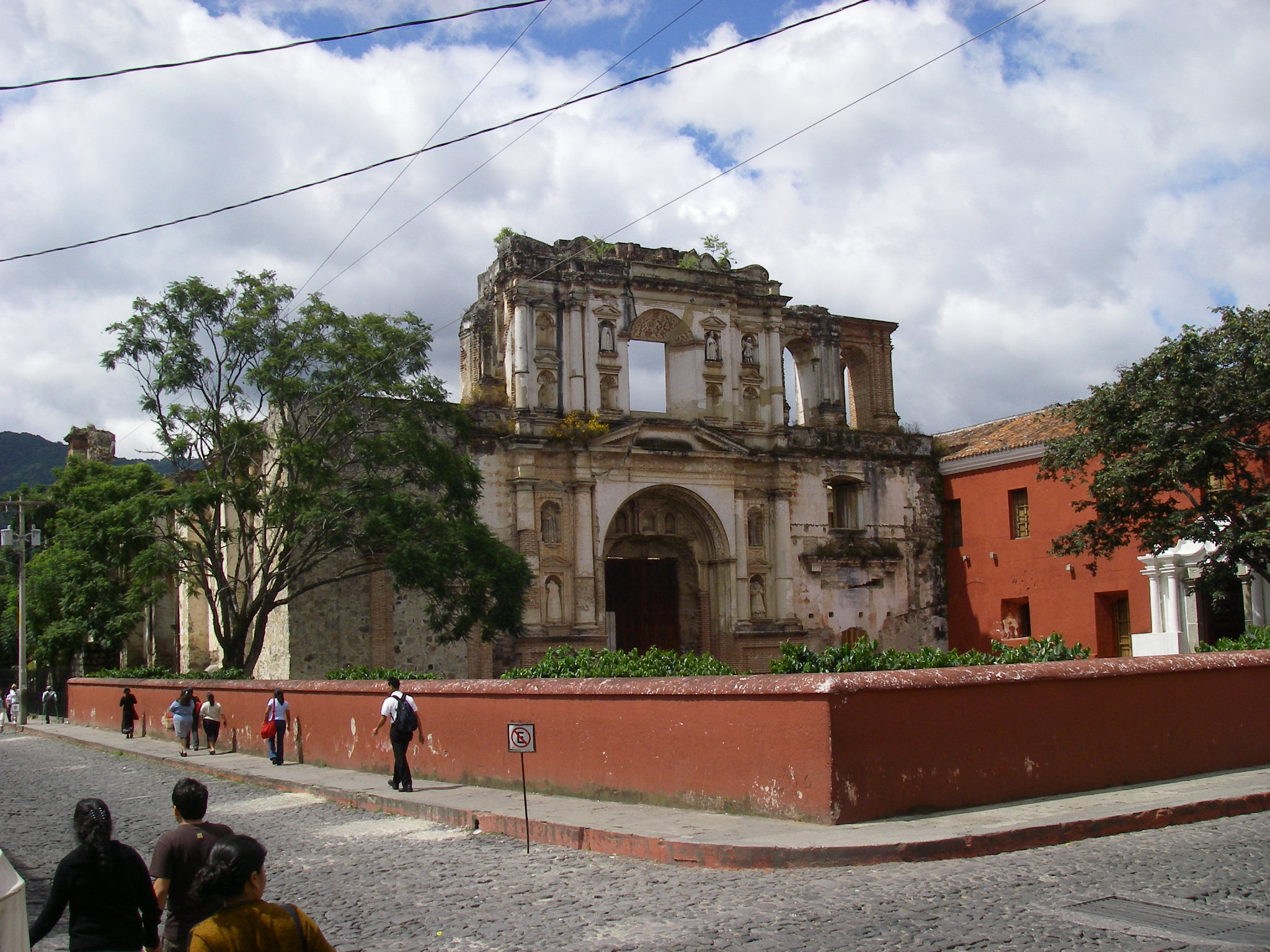
College in Antigua Guatemala

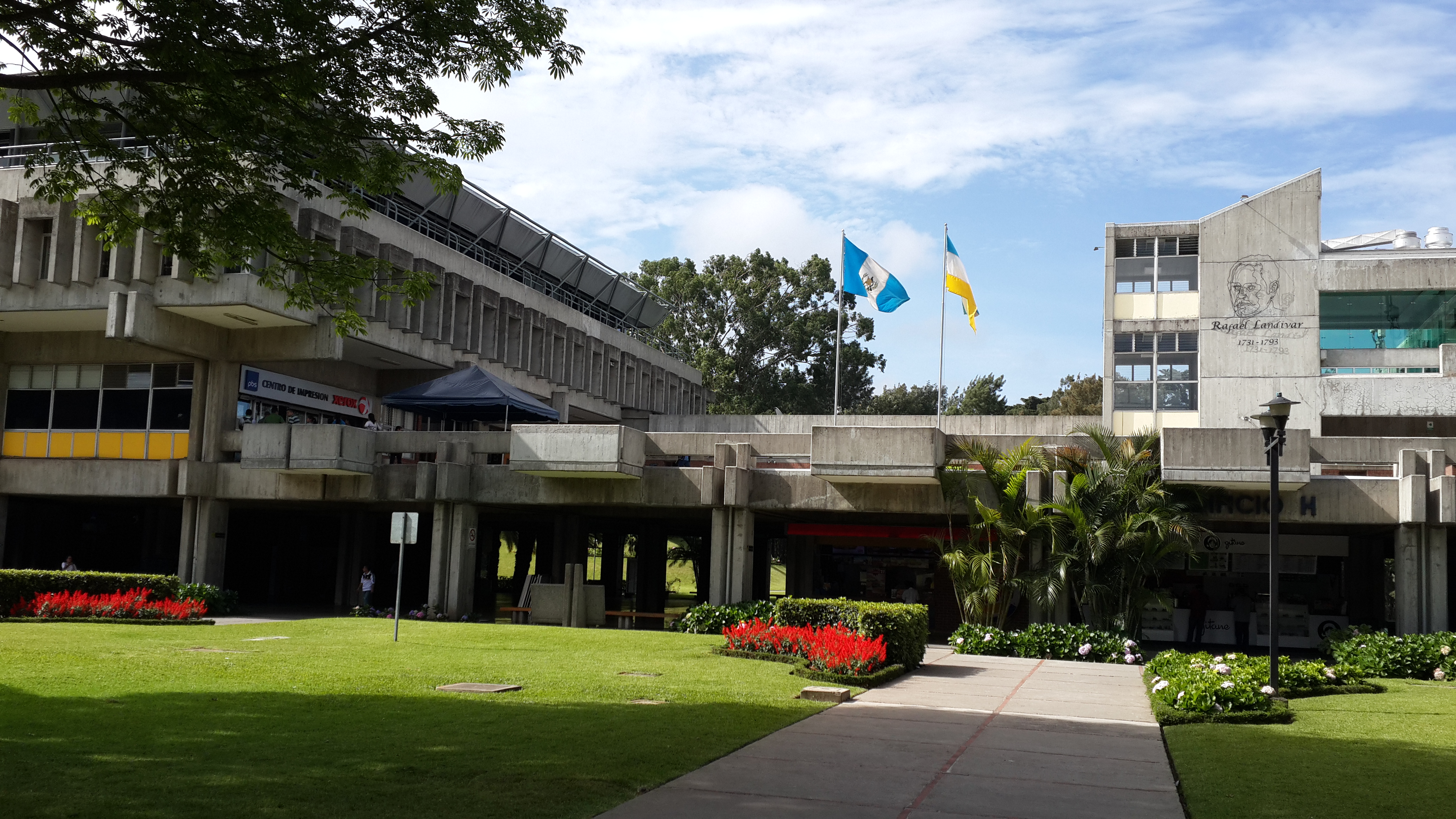
Landívar University central campus

- Jesuit college in Antigua Guatemala (1606–1767), now a center of the Spanish Agency for International Development Cooperation and ruined church
- Trentin School in Guatemala City (1851–1872)
- Xavier Lyceum in Guatemala City (since 1952)
- Loyola College Guatemala in Guatemala City (since 1958)
- Rafael Landívar University on several campuses in Guatemala (since 1961)

=== Guyana ===
- Sacred Heart Church in Georgetown (1857–2004), destroyed by fire
- St. Stanislaus College in Georgetown (1866–1980)

=== Haiti ===
- Jesuit house in Cap-Haïtien (1705–1763), serving parishes in Limonade, Trou-du-Nord, Fort-Liberté, Terrier-Rouge, Port-Margot, Limbé, Dondon, Ouanaminthe, Plaisance & Pilate, and Borgne
- Villa Manrèse center in Port-au-Prince (1959–1964), destroyed in the 2010 Haiti earthquake

=== Honduras ===
- Radio Progreso & ERIC-SJ in El Progreso (since 1980)

=== Jamaica ===
- St. George's College in Kingston (since 1950)
- Campion College in Kingston (since 1960)

=== Mexico ===
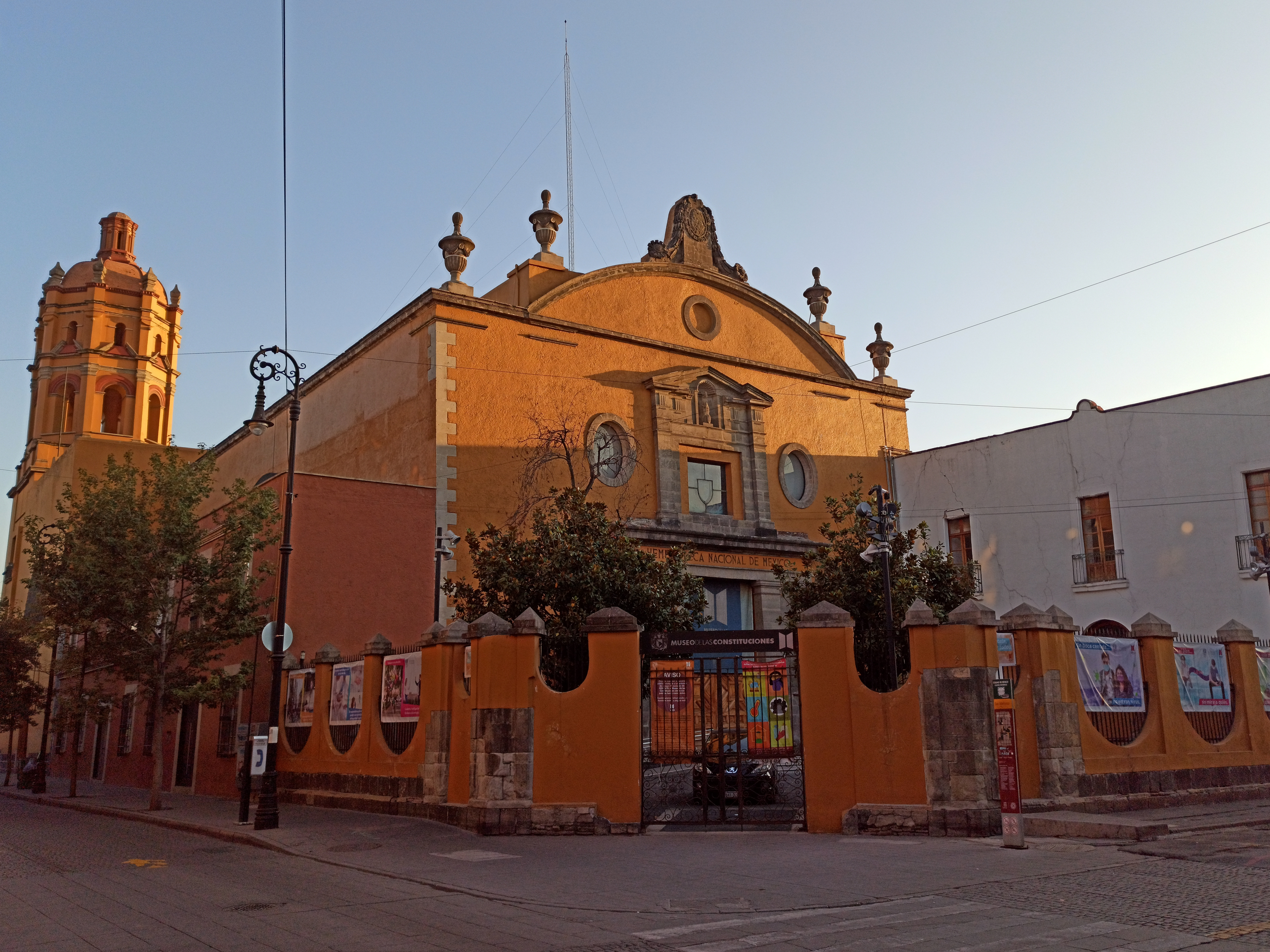
College of Saint Peter and Saint Paul, Mexico City

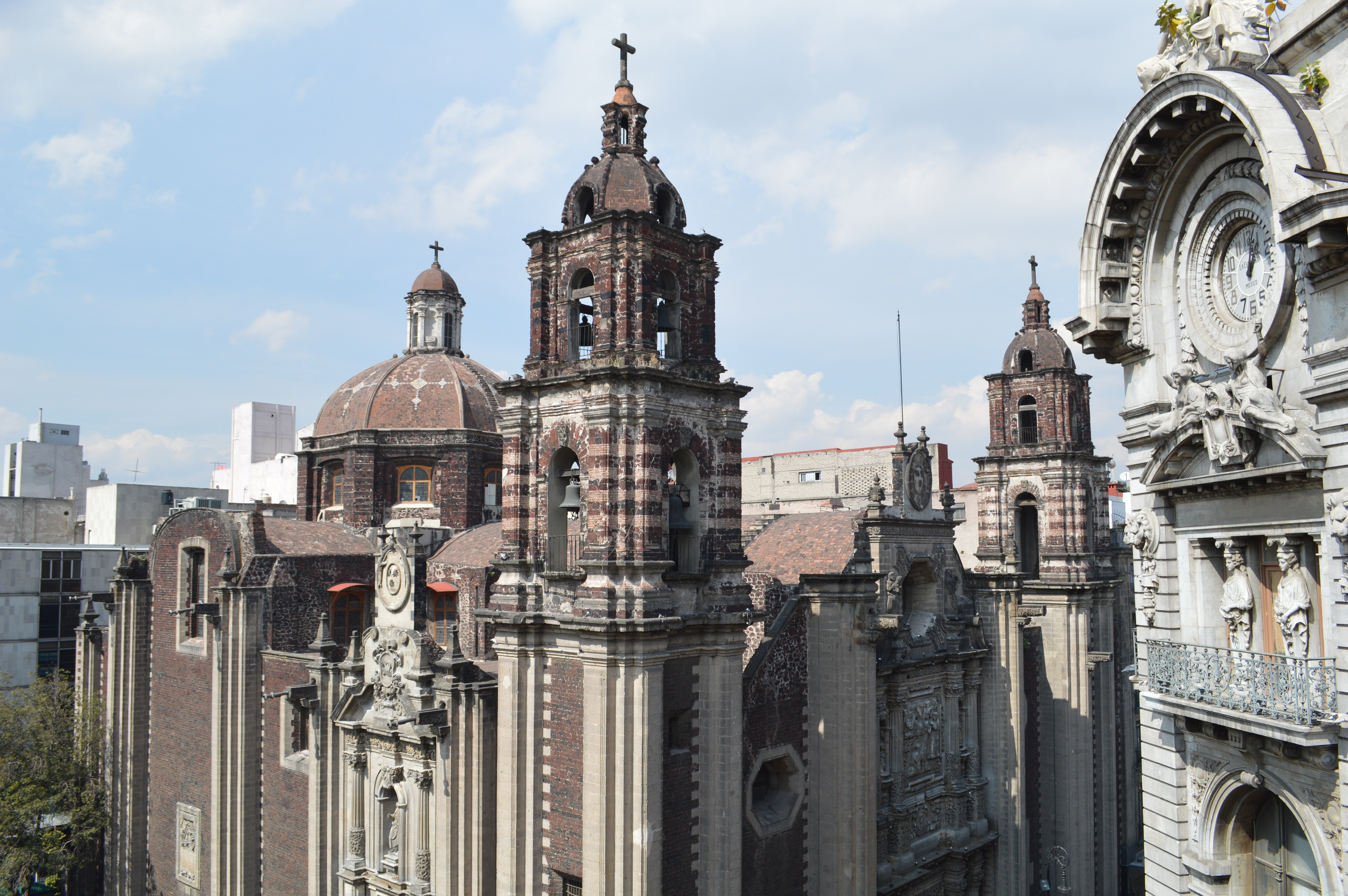
Professed house church, Mexico City

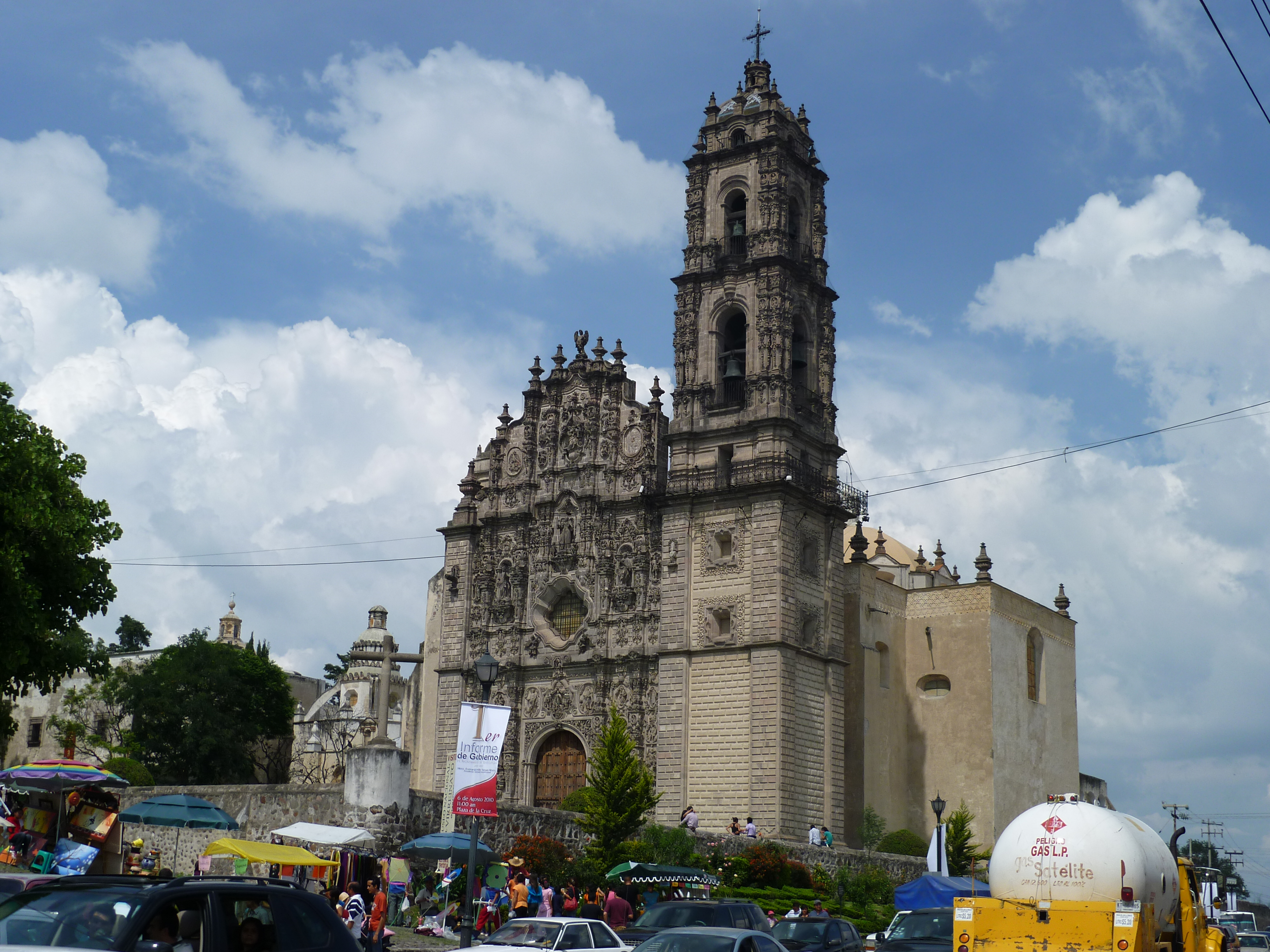
College in Tepotzotlán

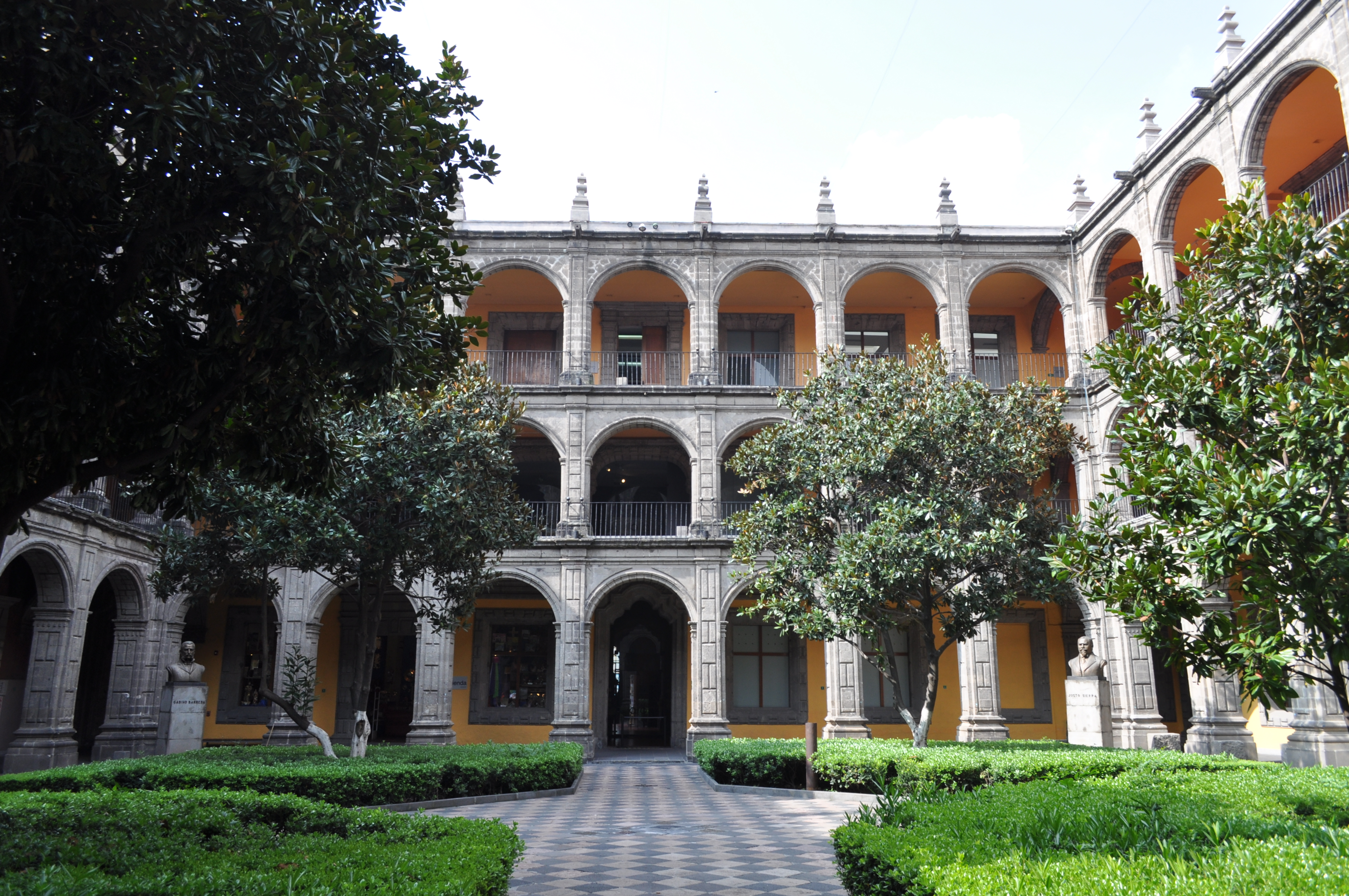
College of Saint Ildefonsus, Mexico City

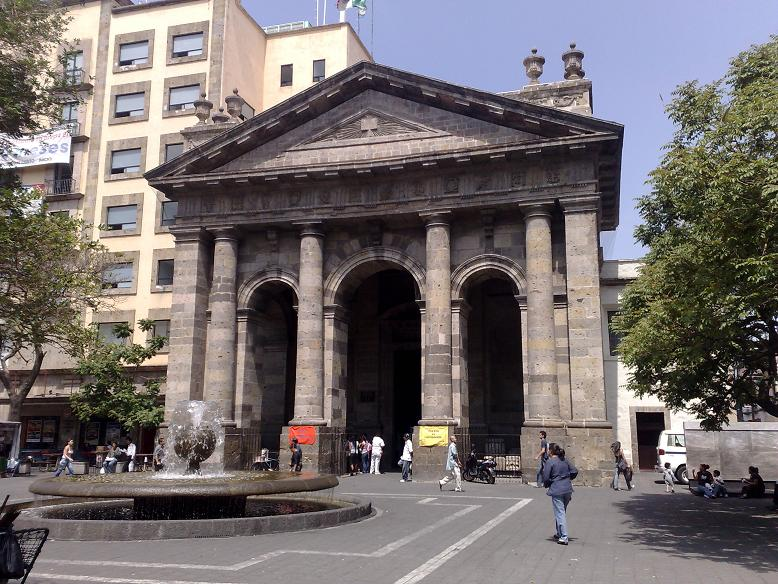
College church, Guadalajara

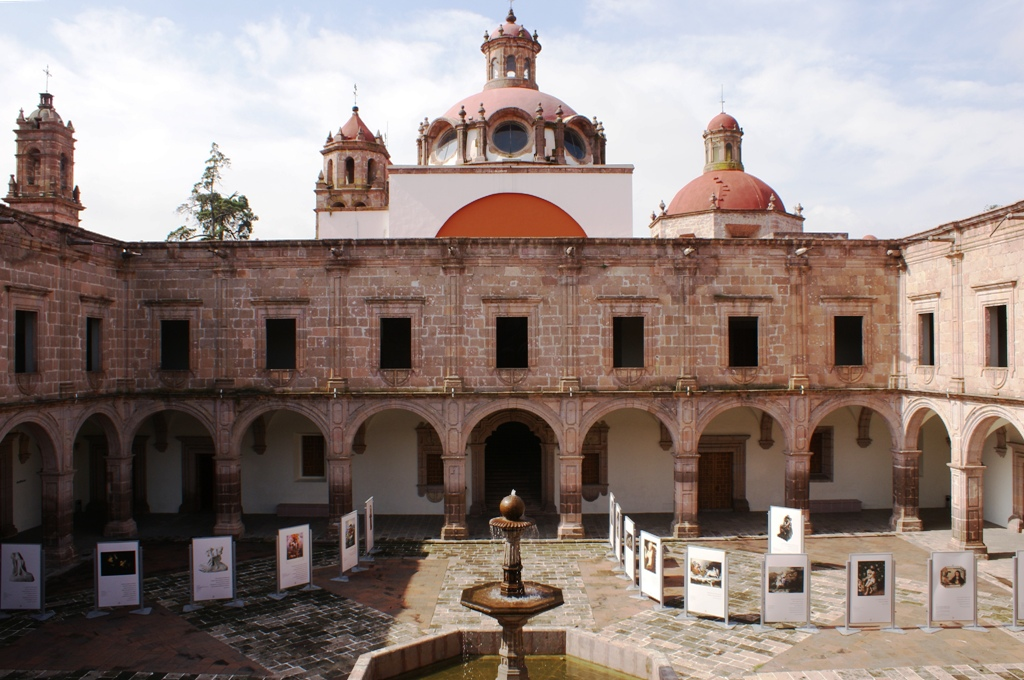
College in Morelia

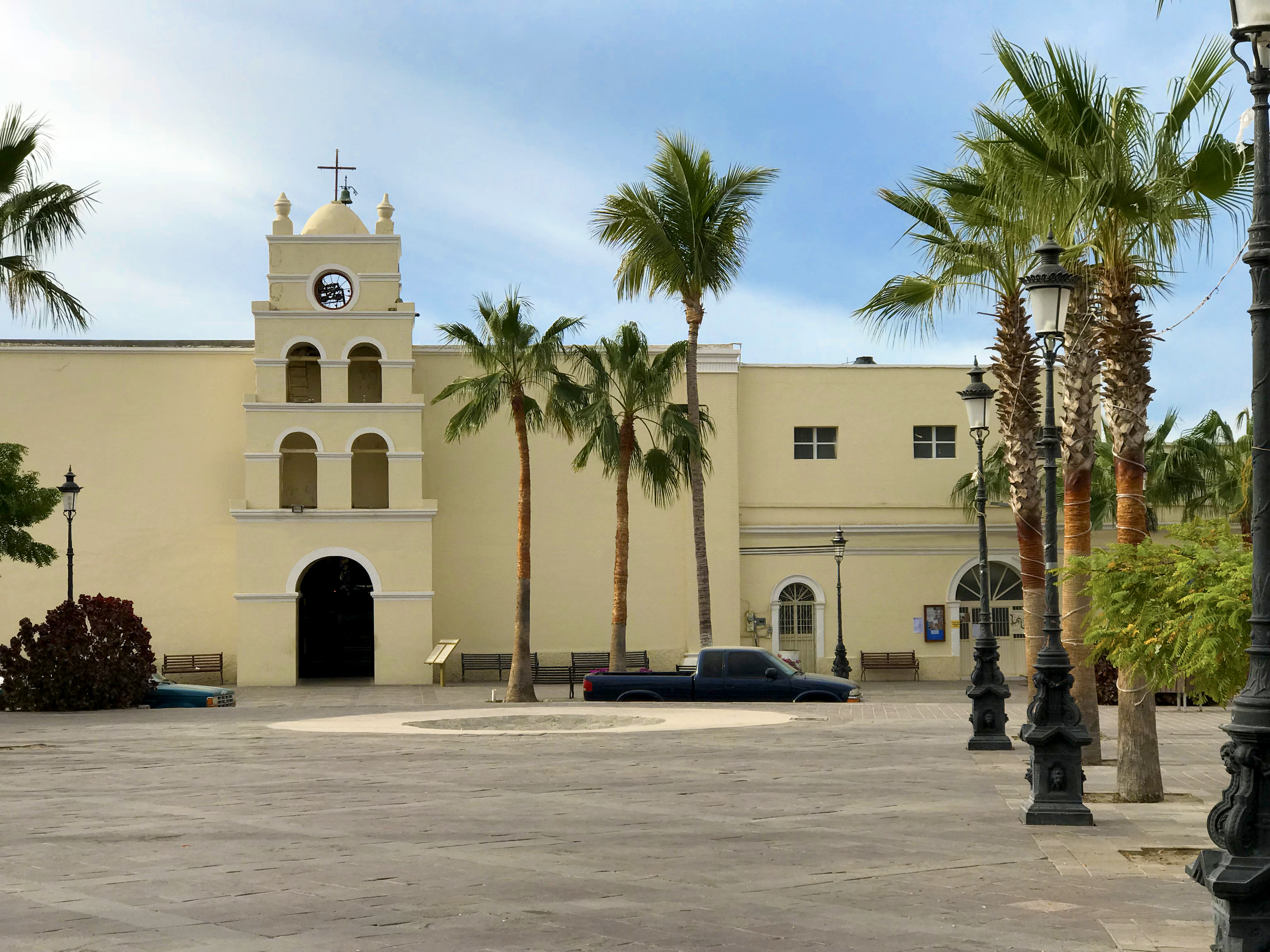
Mission of Santa Rosa de las Palmas, Baja California

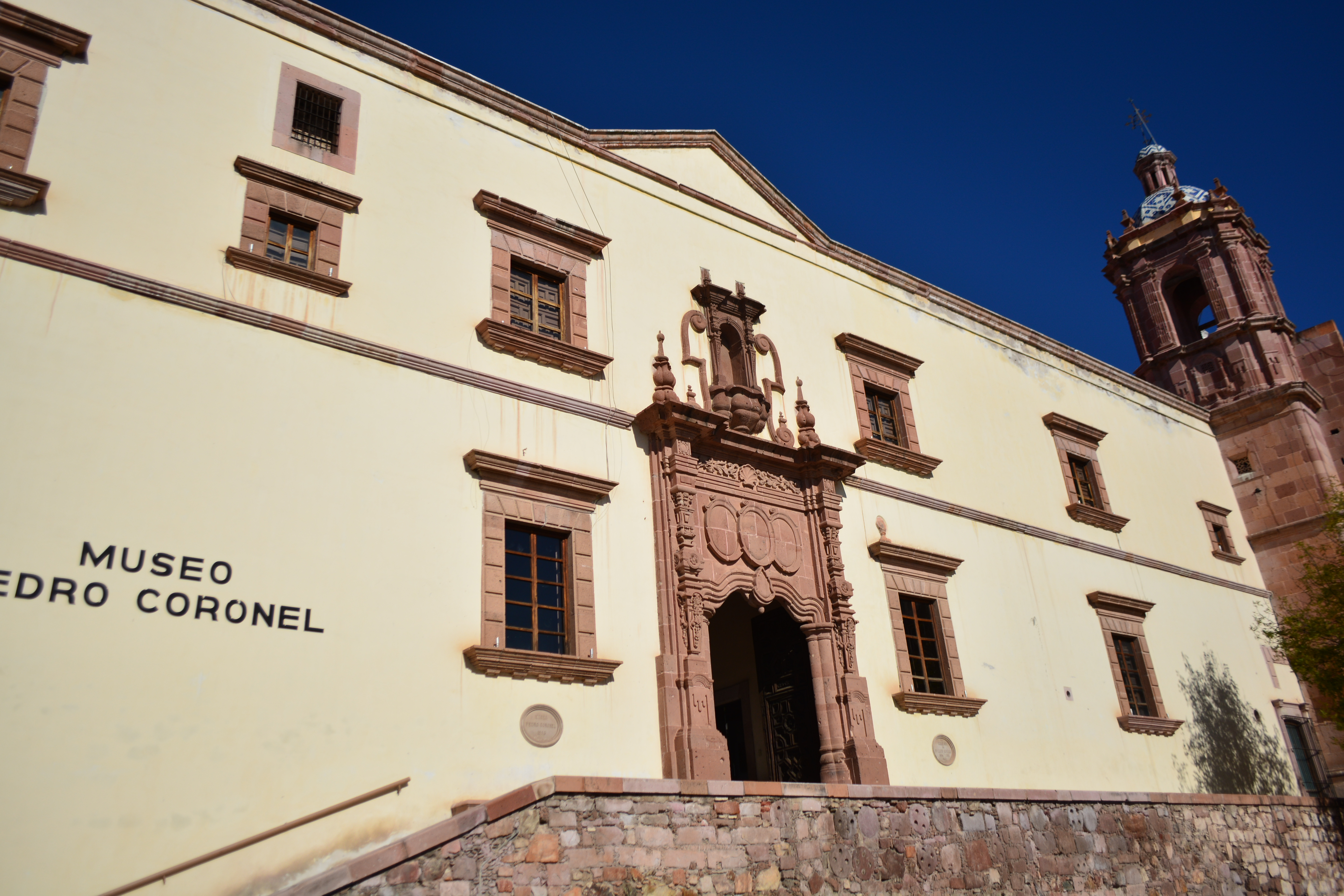
College in Zacatecas

- College of Saint Peter and Saint Paul in Mexico City (1574–1767), now Centro Nacional de Conservación y Registro del Patrimonio Artístico Mueble (CENCROPAM, part of Instituto Nacional de Bellas Artes y Literatura) and Museo de las Constituciones in the former college church
- Professed house in Mexico City (1578–1767), now Pinacoteca de La Profesa and Church of San Felipe Neri "La Profesa"
- Jesuit college in Puebla (1580–1767), now Meritorious Autonomous University of Puebla and Church of La Compañía
- College of Saint Francis Xavier in Tepotzotlán, now home of the Museo Nacional del Virreinato (1580s–1767) including the Church of Saint Francis Xavier and the parish church of San Pedro Apóstol
- College of Saint Gregory for Native Mexicans in Mexico City (1586–1767), adjacent to the College of Saint Peter and Saint Paul, now Universidad Obrera de México
- College of Saint Ildefonsus boarding school in Mexico City (1588–1767), now a museum and cultural center of the same name, and Museum of Light in the complex's eastern wing; precursor to Escuela Nacional Preparatoria
- Jesuit mission in San Luis de la Paz (from 1590)
- Jesuit college of Saint Thomas Aquinas in Guadalajara (1591–1767), now Biblioteca Iberoamericana Octavio Paz
- Jesuit college in San Luis Potosí (1624–1767), now Universidad Autónoma de San Luis Potosí and Loreto Chapel
- Jesuit colleges of Saint Ignatius and Saint Francis Xavier in Querétaro City (1625–1767), now Faculty of Philosophy of Autonomous University of Queretaro and Parish church of Santiago
- Jesuit missions in Sonora and Chihuaha:
  - Mission San Ignacio de Cuquiarachi (1645–1767)
  - Mission Nuestra Señora de la Asunción de Arizpe (1646–1767)
  - Mission of San Francisco de Borja in Chihuahua (1645–1767)
  - Mission Nuestra Señora de los Dolores near Cucurpe (1687–1744)
  - Mission San Pedro y San Pablo in Tubutama (1687–1767)
  - Mission Santa Teresa in Atil (1687–1767)
- Jesuit college in Morelia (1660–1767), now Centro Cultural Clavijero, Public Library of Universidad Michoacana and Church of the Jesuits
- Jesuit missions in Baja California:
  - Misión San Bruno near Loreto (1684–1685)
  - Misión de Nuestra Señora de Loreto Conchó in Loreto (1697–1767)
  - Visita de San Juan Bautista Londó near Loreto (1699–1767)
  - Misión San Javier near Loreto (1699–1767)
  - Misión San Juan Bautista Malibat near Loreto (1705–1767)
  - Misión Santa Rosalía in Mulegé (1705–1767)
  - Misión San Jose de Comondú near Loreto (1708–1767)
  - Misión La Purísima Concepción de Cadegomó near Loreto (1720–1767)
  - Misión de Nuestra Señora del Pilar de La Paz Airapí in La Paz (1720–1767)
  - Misión Nuestra Señora de Guadalupe de Huasinapi near Mulegé (1720–1767)
  - Misión Santiago de Los Coras near San José del Cabo (1721–1767)
  - Misión Nuestra Señora de los Dolores del Sur Chillá between Loreto and La Paz (1721–1767)
  - Misión San Ignacio Kadakaamán in San Ignacio (1728–1767)
  - Misión Estero de las Palmas de San José del Cabo Añuití near San José del Cabo (1730–1767)
  - Misión Santa Rosa de las Palmas in Todos Santos (1733–1767)
  - Misión San Luis Gonzaga Chiriyaqui (1740–1767)
  - Misión Santa Gertrudis near San Ignacio (1752–1767)
  - Misión San Francisco Borja near Bahía de los Ángeles (1762–1767)
  - Visita de Calamajué (1766–1767)
  - Misión Santa María de los Ángeles near Cataviña (1767)
- Santuario de Nuestra Señora de Guadalupe (Tecomajiaca) in Teapa, Tabasco (1712–1767)
- College of the Holy Trinity in Guanajuato City (1744–1767), now Universidad de Guanajuato and Church of the Jesuits
- College of the Immaculate Conception in Zacatecas City (1749–1767), now Museo Pedro Coronel and Church of Saint Dominic
- East Institute in Puebla (since 1870)
- College of San Juan Nepomucene in Saltillo (1878–1914)
- Casa de los Mascarones in Mexico City (1893–1914)
- Lux Institute in León, Guanajuato (since 1941)
- Carlos Pereyra School in Torreón, Coahuila (since 1942)
- Universidad Iberoamericana in Mexico City (since 1943) with campuses created later in León, Tijuana, Torreón and Puebla
- ITESO, Universidad Jesuita de Guadalajara in Tlaquepaque, Jalisco (since 1957)
- Instituto Cultural Tampico in Tampico, Tamaulipas (since 1962)
- Universidad Iberoamericana León in León, Guanajuato (since 1978)
- Campus of Universidad Iberoamericana and Ibero College in Tijuana (since 1982)
- Iberoamerican University Torreón in Torreón, Coahuila (since 1982)
- Universidad Iberoamericana Puebla in Puebla (since 1983)
- Miguel Pro Human Rights Center in Mexico City (since 1988)
- Jesuit Migrant Service, Mexico in Mexico City (since 2001), with offices in Tecozautla and Frontera Comalapa
- Intercultural Institute of Ayuuk in Jaltepec de Candayoc, Oaxaca (since 2006)

=== Nicaragua ===
- Colegio Centro América in Managua (since 1916)
- Instituto Loyola in Managua (since 1946)

=== Panama ===
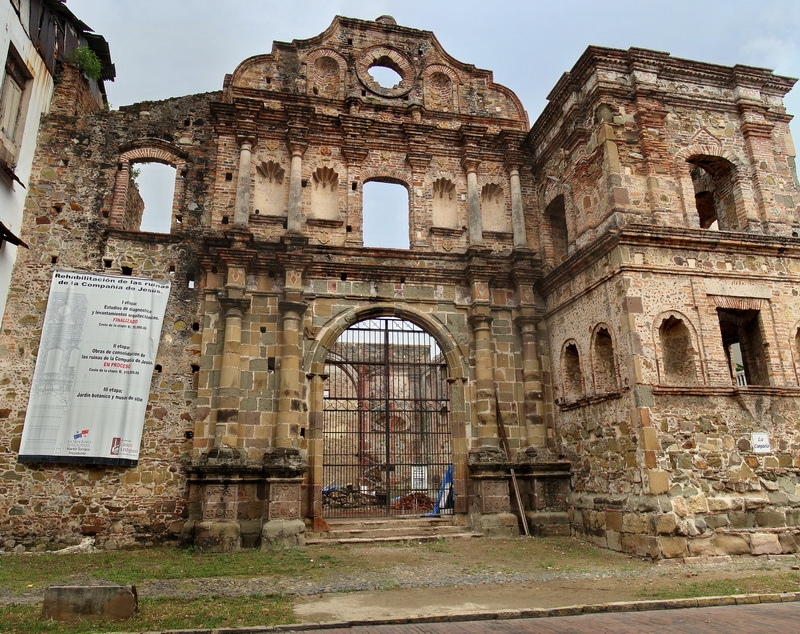
College in Panama City

- Jesuit college of Saint Ignatius in Panama City (1641–1767), now standing ruins of Iglesia de la Compañía in the Casco Viejo
- Xavier College in Panama City (since 1948)

=== Paraguay ===
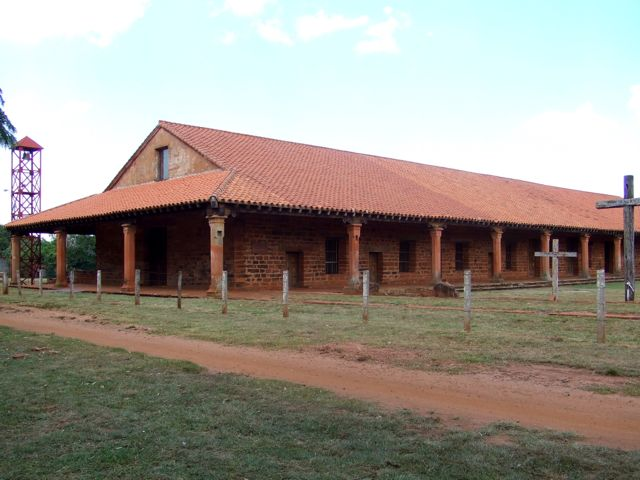
Mission of San Cosme y Damián

- Jesuit college in Asunción (1594–1767), now Congress of Paraguay
- Mission of San Ignacio Guazú in San Ignacio, Misiones Department (1610–1767)
- Mission of San Cosme y Damián, Itapúa Department (1632–1767)
- Mission of Santa María de Fe, Misiones Department (1647–1767)
- Mission of Santiago Apóstol, Misiones Department (1669–1767)
- Mission of Santa Rosa de Lima, Misiones Department (1698–1767)
- Mission of Santisima Trinidad de Parana, Itapúa Department (1706–1767)
- Mission of Jesús de Tavarangue, Itapúa Department (1760–1767)
- Colegio Cristo Rey in Asunción (since 1938)
- Xavier Technical College in Asunción (since 1970)
- Higher Institute of Humanistic and Philosophical Studies in Asunción (since 1978)

=== Peru ===
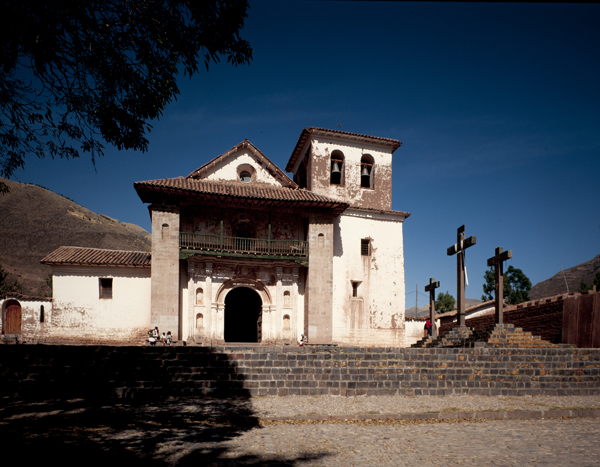
Church of Saint Peter, Andahuaylillas

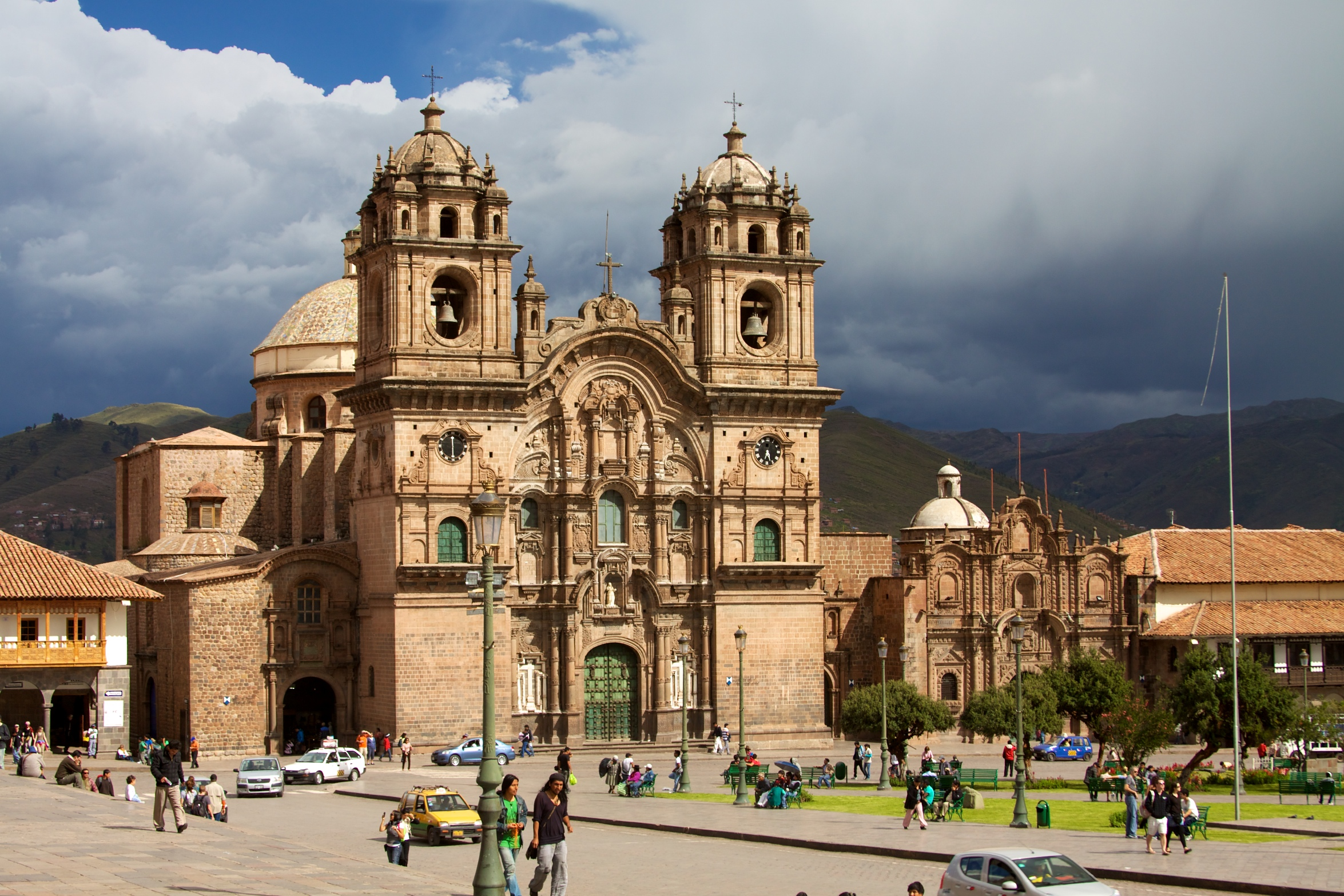
College in Cusco

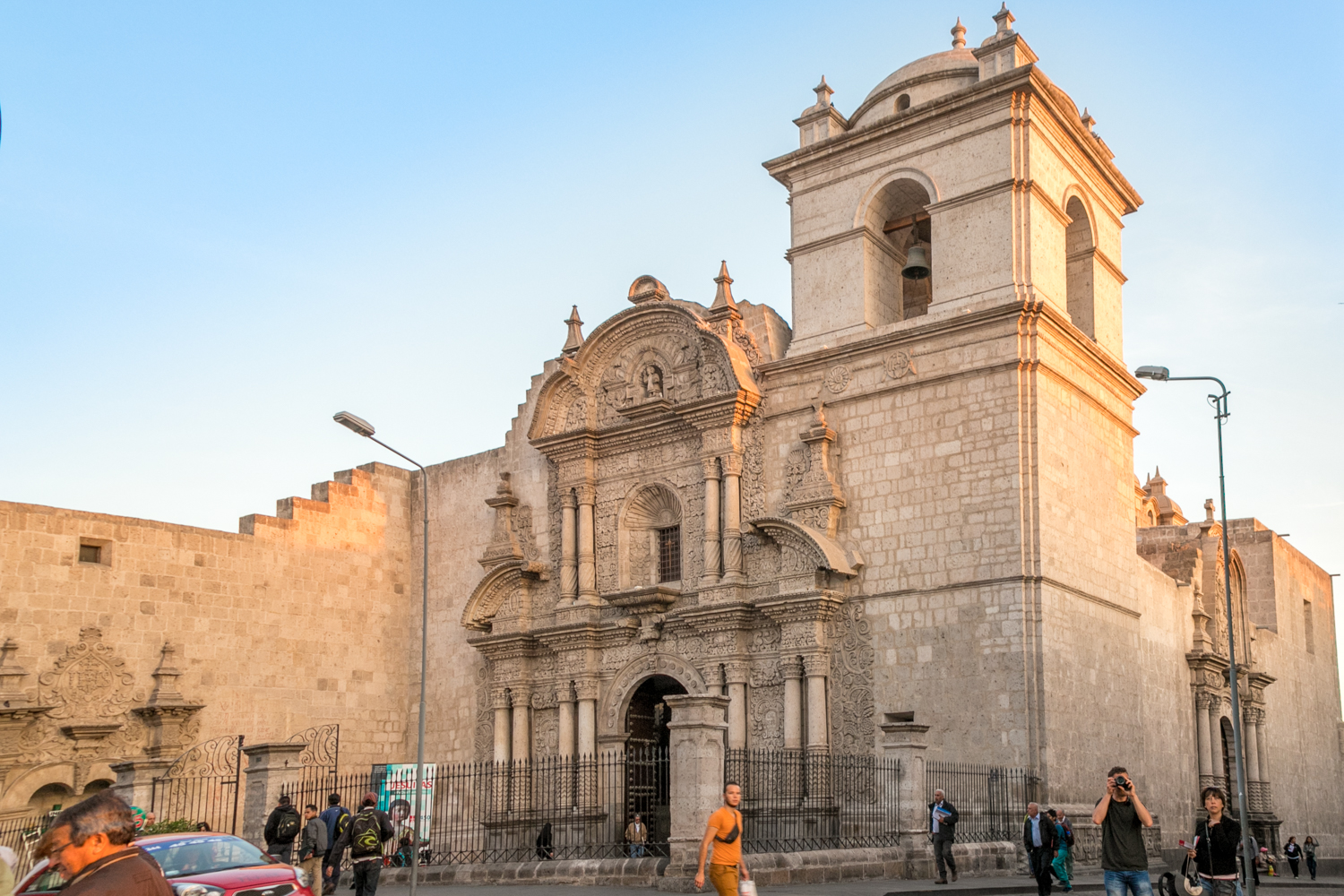
College church, Arequipa

- Saint Paul's College, Lima in Lima (1568–1767), now Central Reserve Bank of Peru, National Library of Peru and Basilica and Convent of San Pedro
- Church of Saint Peter in Andahuaylillas near Cusco (1570–1767)
- Jesuit college in Cusco (1571–1767), from 1621 Royal University of Saint Ignatius, now part of National University of Saint Anthony the Abbot, including the building known as Paraninfo Universitario and the Iglesia de la Compañía de Jesús
- Jesuit mission in Juli near Lake Titicaca (1576–1767), now churches of Saint Peter Martyr, Saint John Lateran, the Holy Cross of Jerusalem and Our Lady of the Assumption
- Royal College of Saint Martin in Lima (1582–1767)
- Jesuit college and church in Arequipa (1590–1767)
- Royal college in Lima (1592–1767), now Royal College of the University of San Marcos
- Seminary of Saint Anthony the Abbot in Cusco (1598–1692); precursor to the National University of Saint Anthony the Abbot, which eventually also absorbed the former Jesuit university
- Novitiate of Saint Anthony the Abbot in Lima (1605–1767), now Centro Cultural "La Casona" of National University of San Marcos
- College of Saint Bernard for Colonists in Cusco (1619–1767), now cultural center of the Provincial Municipality of Cusco
- College of Saint Francis Borgia for Native Peruvians in Cusco (1619–1767), now a school of the same name (Colegio San Francisco de Borja)
- Church of Saint Xavier of Nasca and Church of Saint Joseph of Nasca in El Ingenio District (1740s–1767)
- Jesuit reduction of San Pablo de Nuevo Napeanos, now Iquitos, Maynas Province (1764–1767)
- Colegio de la Inmaculada in Lima (since 1878)
- Colegio San José in Arequipa (since 1898)
- Cristo Rey College in Tacna (since 1962)
- Universidad del Pacífico in Lima (since 1962)
- Jesus the Worker Agro-industrial Training Center in Quispicanchi Province (since 1971)
- Radio Marañón in Jaén (since 1976)
- School of Pedagogy, philosophy, and Literature Antonio Ruiz de Montoya, now Antonio Ruiz de Montoya University in Lima (since 1991)

=== United States ===
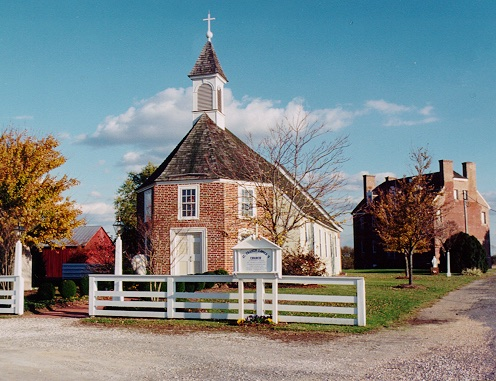
Newtown Manor, Maryland

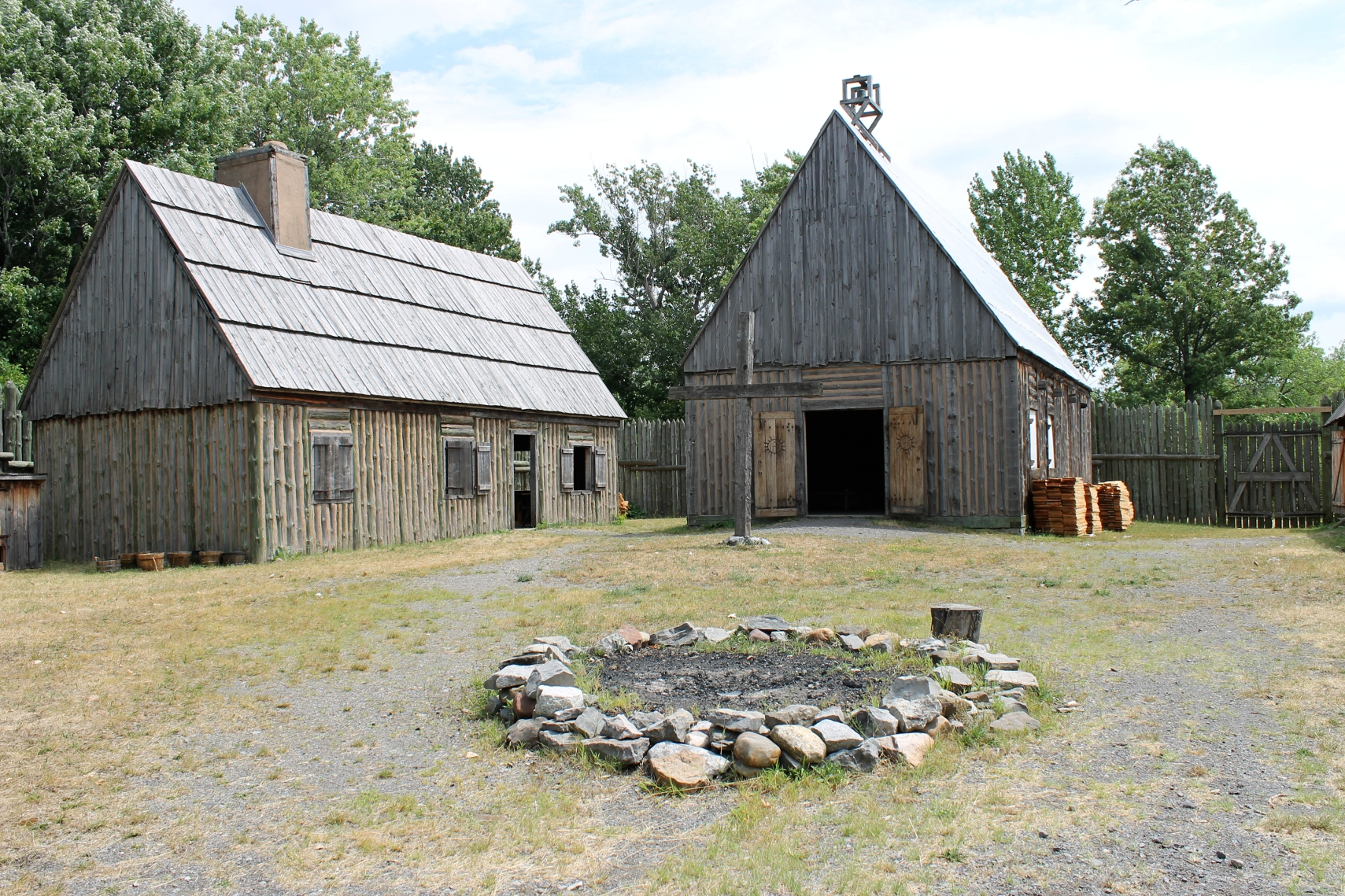
Sainte Marie Among the Iroquois, New York

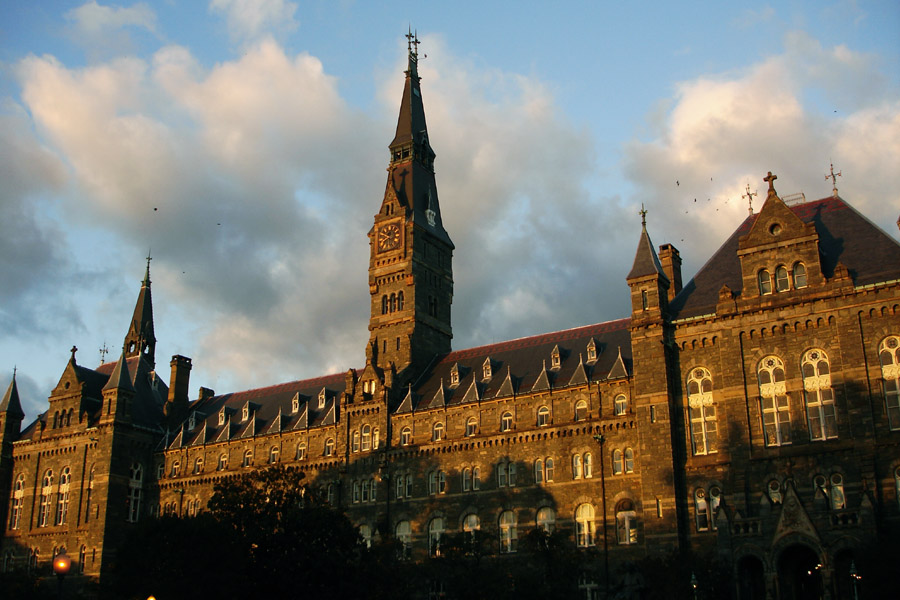
Georgetown University, Washington DC

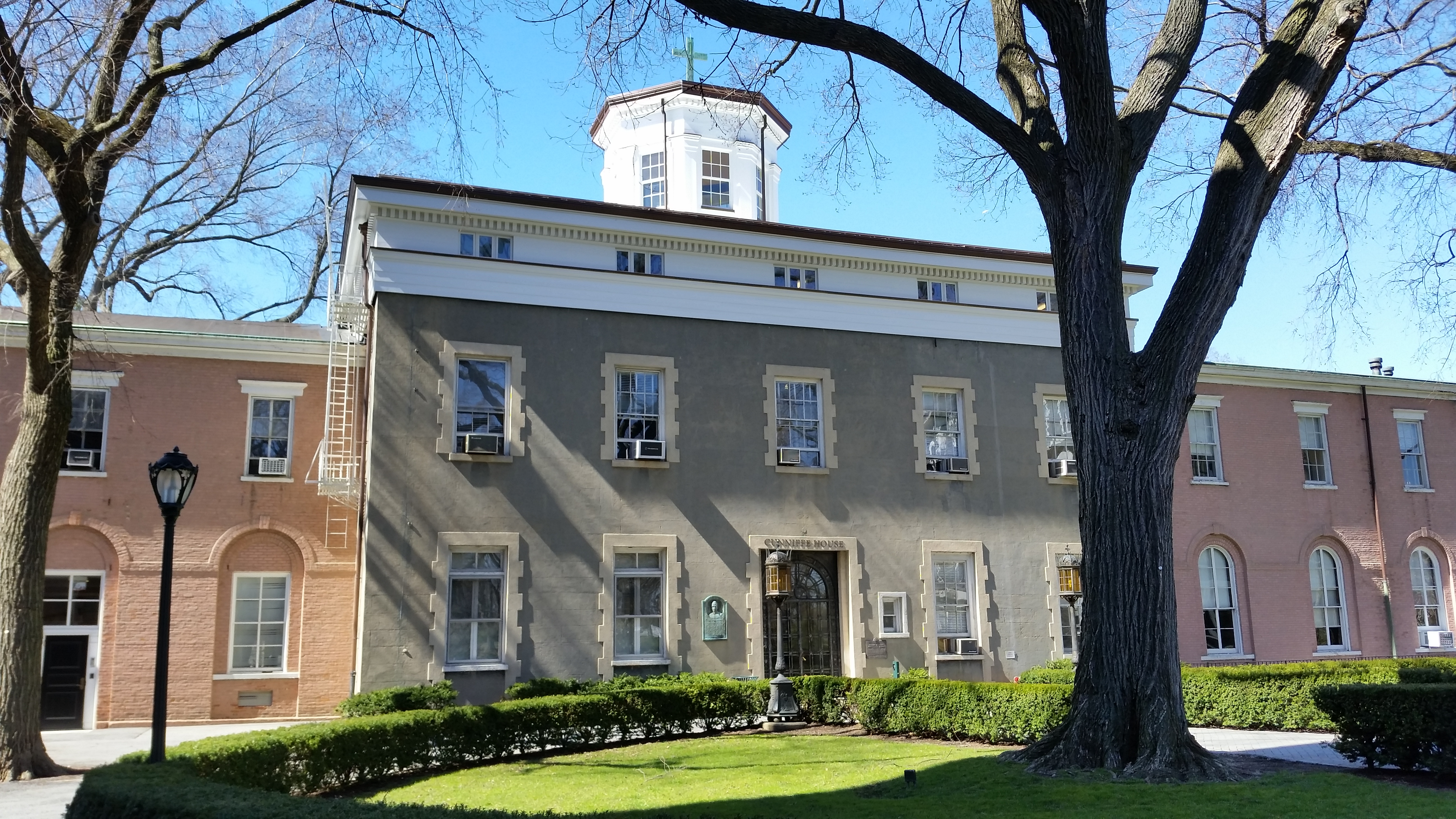
Cunniffe House, Fordham University, New York

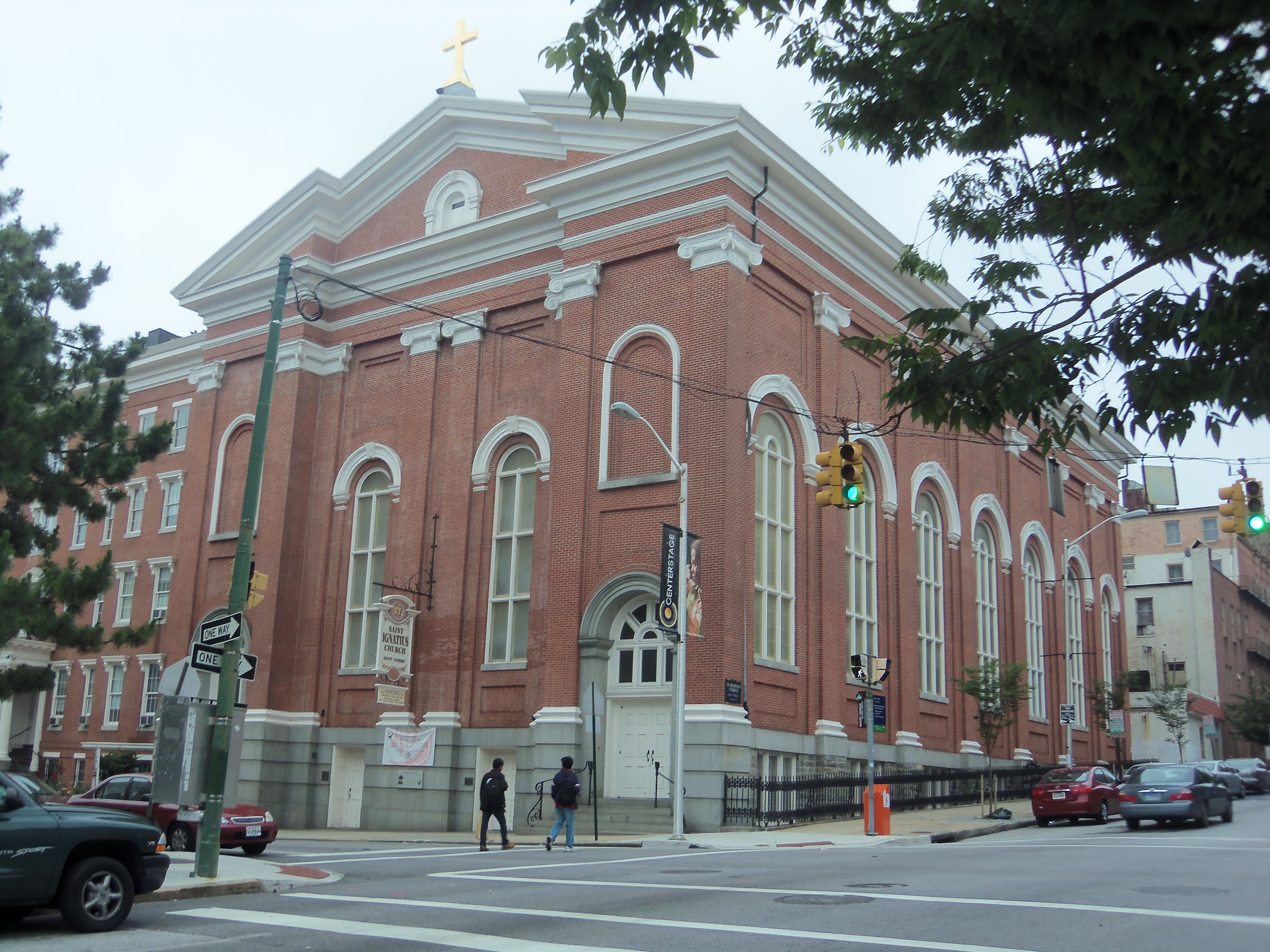
St Ignatius Church, Baltimore

==== National ====
- Jesuit Conference of Canada and the United States in Washington, DC
- American Jesuits International in Washington, DC (since 2010)

==== USA East Province ====
- Santa Elena settlement on Parris Island, South Carolina (late 1560s–1587)
- Ajacán Mission on an undetermined location in Virginia (1570–1571)
- Jesuit mission in St. Mary's City, Maryland (1634–1645)
- Saint Ignatius Manor in St. Inigoes, Maryland (1637-late 18th century)
- Newton Manor in Compton, Maryland (1640-early 19th century), now St. Francis Xavier Church and Newtown Manor House Historic District
- St. Thomas Manor in Port Tobacco Village, Maryland (since 1641)
- Mission of Sainte-Marie de Gannentaha at Liverpool, New York (1656–18th century)
- Mission of Sainte Marie among the Iroquois near Syracuse, New York (1656–1658)
- Jesuit mission in Norridgewock, Maine (1694–1724)
- Bohemia Manor in Warwick, Maryland (1704-?), now St. Francis Xavier Church
- White Marsh Manor in Bowie, Maryland (1741-?), now Sacred Heart Church
- Priest Neal's Mass House and Mill Site in Bel Air, Harford County, Maryland (c.1743–1773)
- Holy Trinity Catholic Church in Washington, D.C. (since 1787)
- Georgetown University in Washington, D.C. (since 1789), including the Dahlgren Chapel of the Sacred Heart and Jesuit Community Cemetery
- Georgetown Preparatory School in North Bethesda, Maryland (since 1805)
- Gonzaga College High School in Washington, D.C. (since 1821), including St. Aloysius Church
- Fordham University and Fordham Preparatory School in New York City (since 1841), including Fordham University Church
- College of the Holy Cross in Worcester, Massachusetts (since 1843)
- Xavier High School in New York City (since 1847)
- Saint Joseph's University and St. Joseph's Preparatory School in Philadelphia (since 1851)
- Loyola University Maryland and St. Ignatius Church in Baltimore (since 1852)
- Boston College in Chestnut Hill, Massachusetts (since 1863)
- Woodstock College in Woodstock, Maryland (1869–1969), later in New York City (1969–1974)
- Canisius University in Buffalo, New York (since 1870)
- Saint Peter's University in Jersey City, New Jersey (since 1872)
- Church of St. Ignatius Loyola in New York City (since 1886)
- University of Scranton in Scranton, Pennsylvania (founded in 1888; under Jesuit control since 1942)
- Manresa Institute on Keyzer Island, now Manresa Island, Connecticut (1889–1911)
- Novitiate of St. Andrew-on-Hudson in Hyde Park, New York (1897–1970), now Culinary Institute of America at Hyde Park
- Regis High School in New York City (since 1914)
- Weston College in Weston, Massachusetts (1922–2008), merged in 2008 into Boston College School of Theology and Ministry
- Fairfield University in Fairfield, Connecticut (since 1942)
- Le Moyne College in Syracuse, New York (since 1946)
- Wheeling University in Wheeling, West Virginia (1954–2019)
- Jesuit Volunteer Corps in Baltimore (since 1956)
- Ignatius House Jesuit Retreat Center in Atlanta, Georgia (since 1960)
- Center of Concern in Washington, D.C. (1971–2018)
- St. Peter's Catholic Church in Charlotte, North Carolina (since 1986)
- St. Raphael the Archangel Catholic Church in Raleigh, North Carolina (since 1996)
- St. Thomas More Catholic Church in Decatur, Georgia (since 2015)

==== USA Central and Southern Province (UCS) (also administers Belize) ====
- Mission at Mound Key in Estero Bay, Florida (1566–1569), now Mound Key Archaeological State Park
- Mission de l'Immaculée Conception at Kaskaskia, Illinois (1693–18th century)
- St. Louis University High School in St. Louis (since 1818)
- Saint Louis University and St. Francis Xavier College Church in St. Louis (since 1827)
- Shrine of St. Joseph, St. Louis in St. Louis (1843–20th century)
- Spring Hill College in Mobile, Alabama (since 1847)
- Jesuit High School (New Orleans) in New Orleans (since 1847)
- St. Mary's Mission (Kansas) in St. Marys, Kansas (1847–20th century)
- Immaculate Conception Church in New Orleans (since 1857)
- Jesuit Outreach, Segundo Barrio in El Paso, Texas (since 1892)
- Jesuit High School in Tampa, Florida (since 1899)
- Cathedral of St. John Berchmans in Shreveport, Louisiana (since 1902)
- Loyola University New Orleans in New Orleans (since 1904)
- Rockhurst University in Kansas City, Missouri (since 1910)
- Rockhurst High School in Kansas City, Missouri (since 1910)
- White House Retreat in St. Louis County, Missouri (metro St. Louis) (since 1922)
- Manresa House of Retreats at the former Jefferson College in Convent, Louisiana (since 1922)
- Jesuit College Preparatory School in Dallas (since 1942)
- Colegio San Ignacio de Loyola in San Juan, Puerto Rico (since 1952)
- Strake Jesuit College Preparatory in Houston (since 1960)
- Belen Jesuit Preparatory School in Tamiami, Florida (since 1962), following relocation from Cuba
- DeSmet Jesuit High School in Creve Coeur, Missouri (metro St. Louis) (since 1967)
- Loyola Academy in St. Louis (since 1999)
- Provincial headquarters in St. Louis

==== USA Midwest Province ====
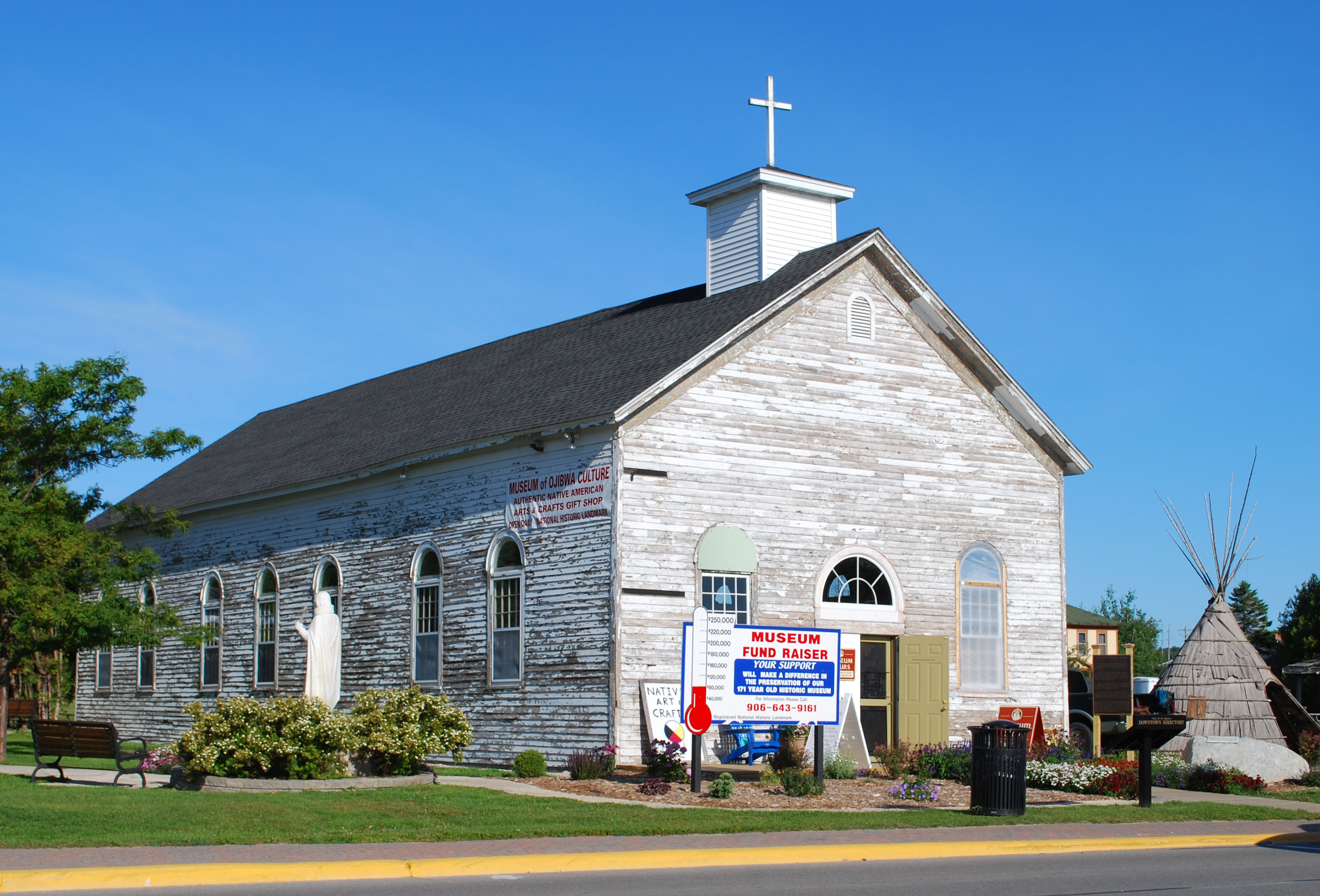
Mission Saint-Ignace, Michigan

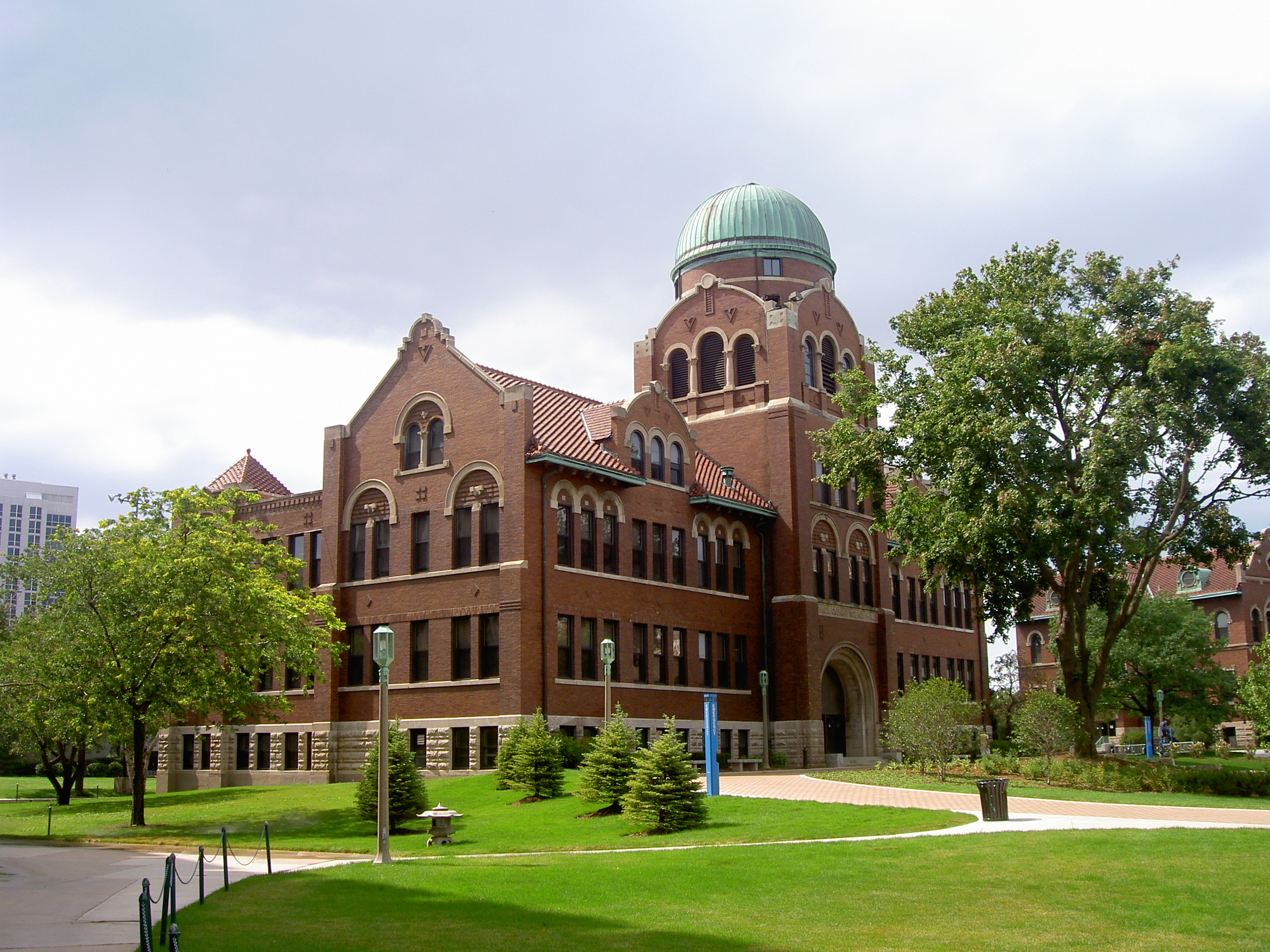
Cudahy Science Hall, Loyola University Chicago

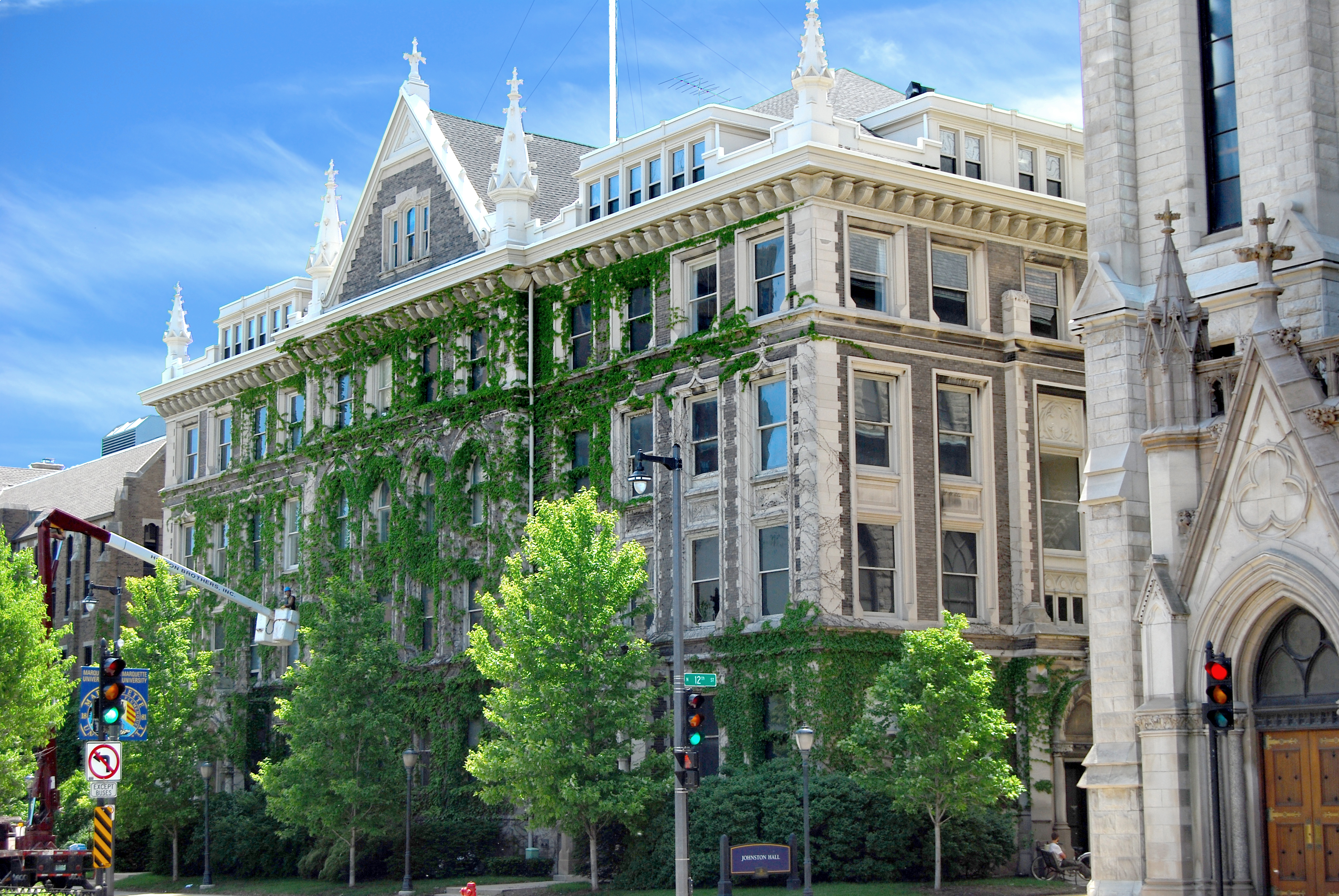
Johnston Hall, Marquette University Milwaukee

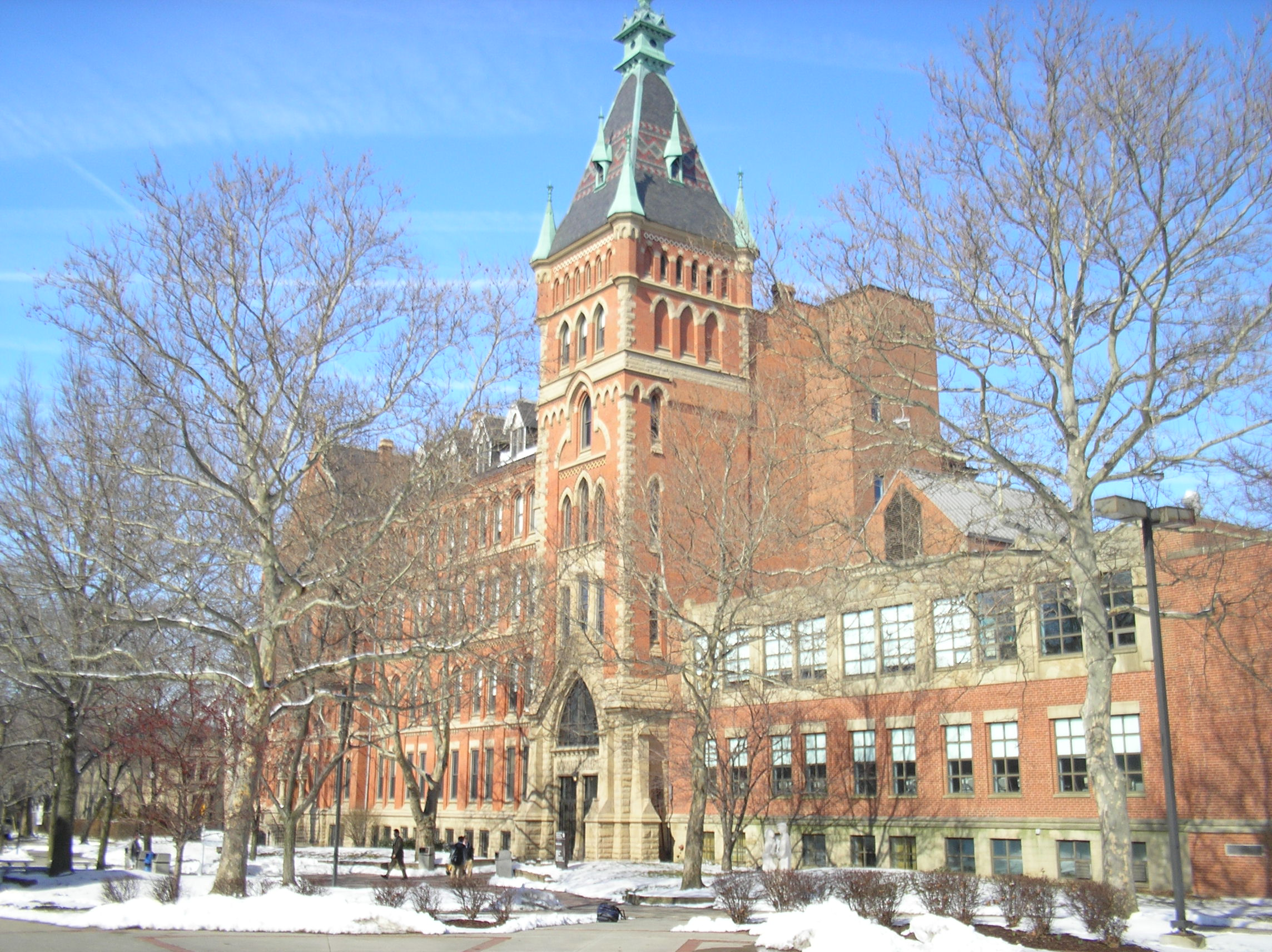
St Ignatius High School, Cleveland

- Mission Sainte-Marie at Sault Ste. Marie, Michigan (1668–18th century), now Holy Name of Mary Pro-Cathedral
- Mission Saint-Ignace at St. Ignace, Michigan (1671–18th century)
- Mission Saint-François-Xavier at De Pere, Wisconsin (1671–18th century)
- Mission La Baye at Green Bay, Wisconsin (1671–18th century)
- Mission Saint-Joseph at Saint-Joseph, Michigan (1680–18th century)
- Mission of the Guardian Angel near Chicago (1696–1700)
- St. Mary's College near Lebanon, Kentucky (1833–1846)
- Xavier University in Norwood, Ohio (since 1840), until 1912 in Cincinnati next to St. Francis Xavier Church
- Saint Aloysius Academy in Milwaukee (since 1857), since 1881 Marquette University High School
- Saint Ignatius College Prep and St. Ignatius College Prep in Chicago (since 1869)
- Loyola University Chicago in Chicago (since 1870)
- Regis University in Denver (since 1877)
- Regis Jesuit High School in Aurora, Colorado (since 1877)
- University of Detroit Jesuit High School and Academy in Detroit (since 1877)
- Creighton University and St. John's Parish in Omaha, Nebraska (since 1878)
- Marquette University in Milwaukee (since 1881)
- John Carroll University in University Heights, Ohio (metro Cleveland) and Church of the Gesu (since 1886)
- Saint Ignatius High School in Ohio City, Cleveland (since 1886)
- Gesu Church in Milwaukee (since 1887)
- University of Detroit Mercy in Detroit (since 1927)
- Sacred Heart Retreat House near Sedalia, Colorado (since 1959)
- St. Xavier High School in Finneytown, Ohio (since 1960)
- Walsh Jesuit High School in Cuyahoga Falls, Ohio (since 1964)
- Homeboyz Interactive in Milwaukee (1996–2006)
- Ignatian Solidarity Network in University Heights, Ohio (metro Cleveland) (since 2004)
- St. John's Jesuit High School and Academy in Toledo, Ohio

==== USA West Province ====
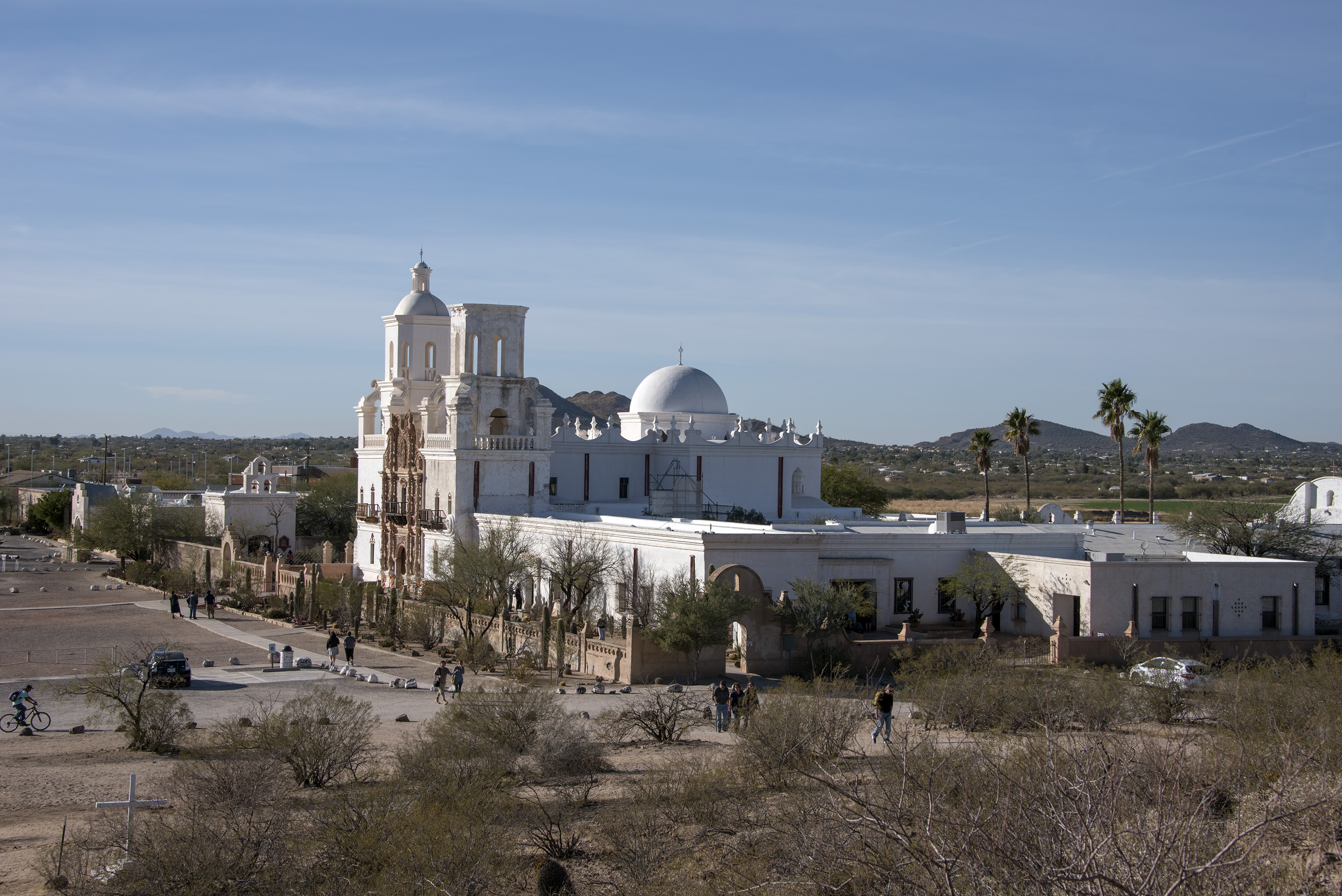
Mission San Xavier del Bac, Arizona

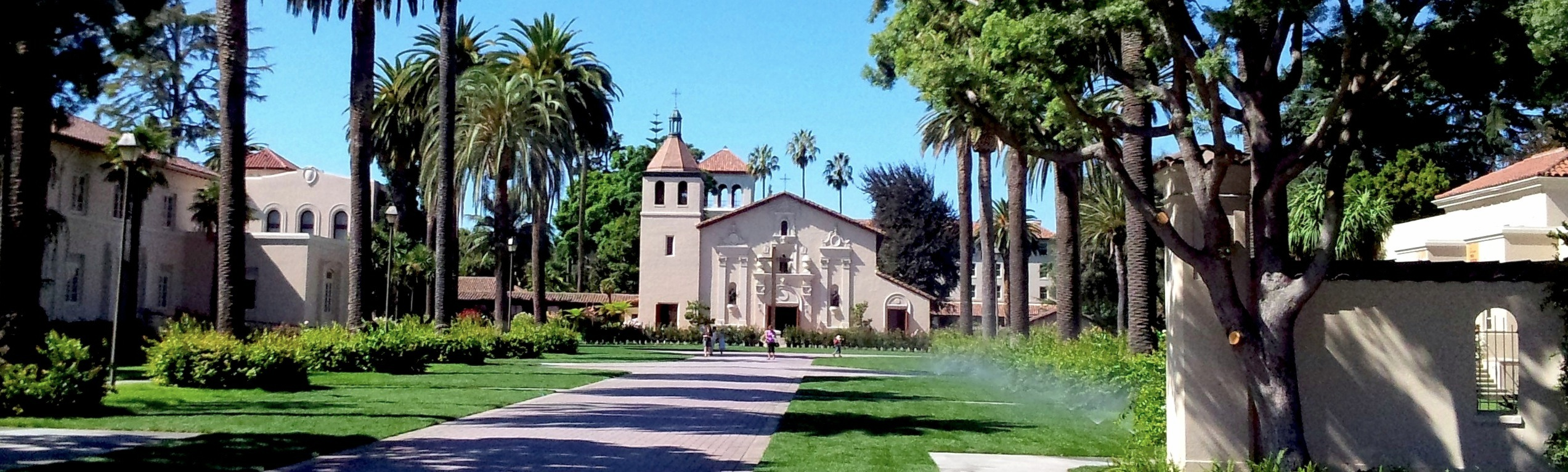
Santa Clara University

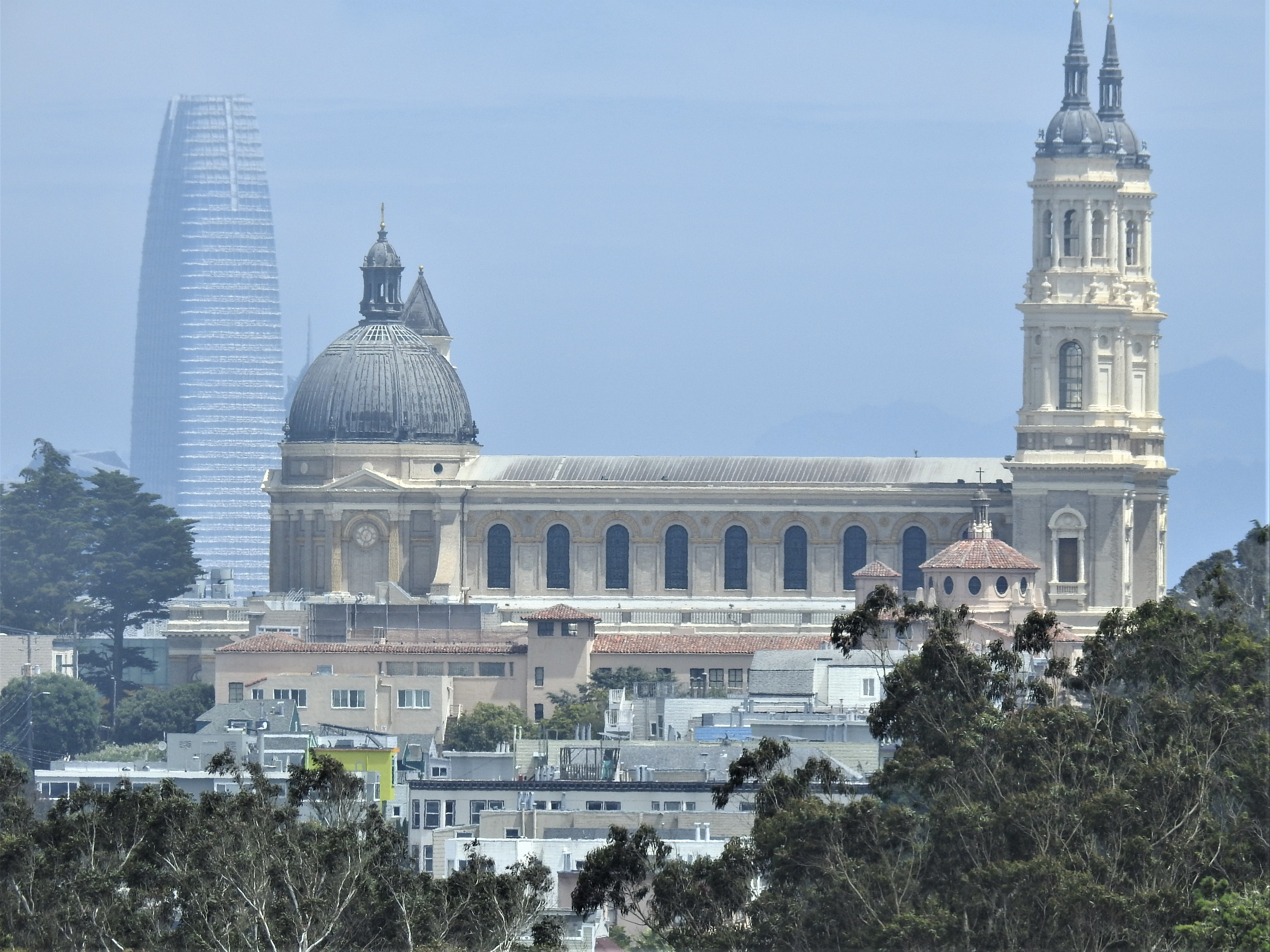
University of San Francisco

- Mission Los Santos Ángeles de Guevavi near Nogales, Arizona (1691–1768)
- Brophy College Preparatory in Phoenix, Arizona (since 1928)
- Mission San Xavier del Bac near Tucson, Arizona (1692–1768)
- Mission San Cosme y Damián de Tucsón in Tucson, Arizona (1692–1767)
- Mission San José de Tumacácori near Nogales, Arizona (1752–1768)
- Mission San Cayetano de Calabazas near Nogales, Arizona (1756–1768)
- Old Mission State Park in Cataldo, Idaho (1850-late 19th century?)
- Santa Clara University in Santa Clara, California (since 1851)
- Bellarmine College Preparatory in San Jose, California (since 1851)
- University of San Francisco in San Francisco (since 1855), including the Saint Ignatius Church and, since 1984, the Ricci Institute
- St. Ignatius College Preparatory in San Francisco (since 1855)
- Jesuit High School in Sacramento, California (since 1963)
- Mount Saint Michael Seminary in Spokane, Washington (1878–1977)
- St. Francis Xavier Church in Missoula, Montana (since 1881)
- St. Peter's Mission Church and Cemetery in Cascade, Montana (1881–1898)
- St. Francis Mission in St. Francis, South Dakota (since 1886)
- Gonzaga University in Spokane, Washington (since 1887)
- Red Cloud Indian School in Pine Ridge, South Dakota (since 1888)
- Seattle University in Seattle (since 1891)
- Loyola Marymount University in Los Angeles (since 1911)
- Jesuit School of Theology of Santa Clara University in Berkeley, California (since 1934), relocated in 1969 from Los Gatos, California
- Dolores Mission in Los Angeles (since the early 1980s)
- Homeboy Industries in Los Angeles (since 1992)
- Kino Border Initiative in Nogales, Arizona (since 2008)
- Fr. Sauer Academy in San Francisco (since 2016)

=== Uruguay ===
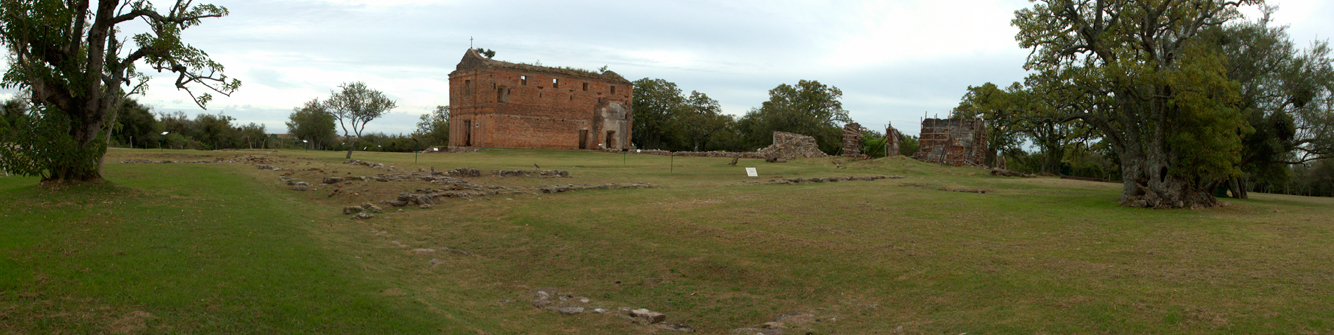
Estancia del Río de las Vacas

- Estancia del Río de las Vacas, now known as Calera de las Huérfanas in Carmelo (1738–1767)
- College of the Sacred Heart in Montevideo (since 1880), including th Church of the Sacred Heart
- Catholic University of Uruguay in Montevideo (since 1985)

=== Venezuela ===
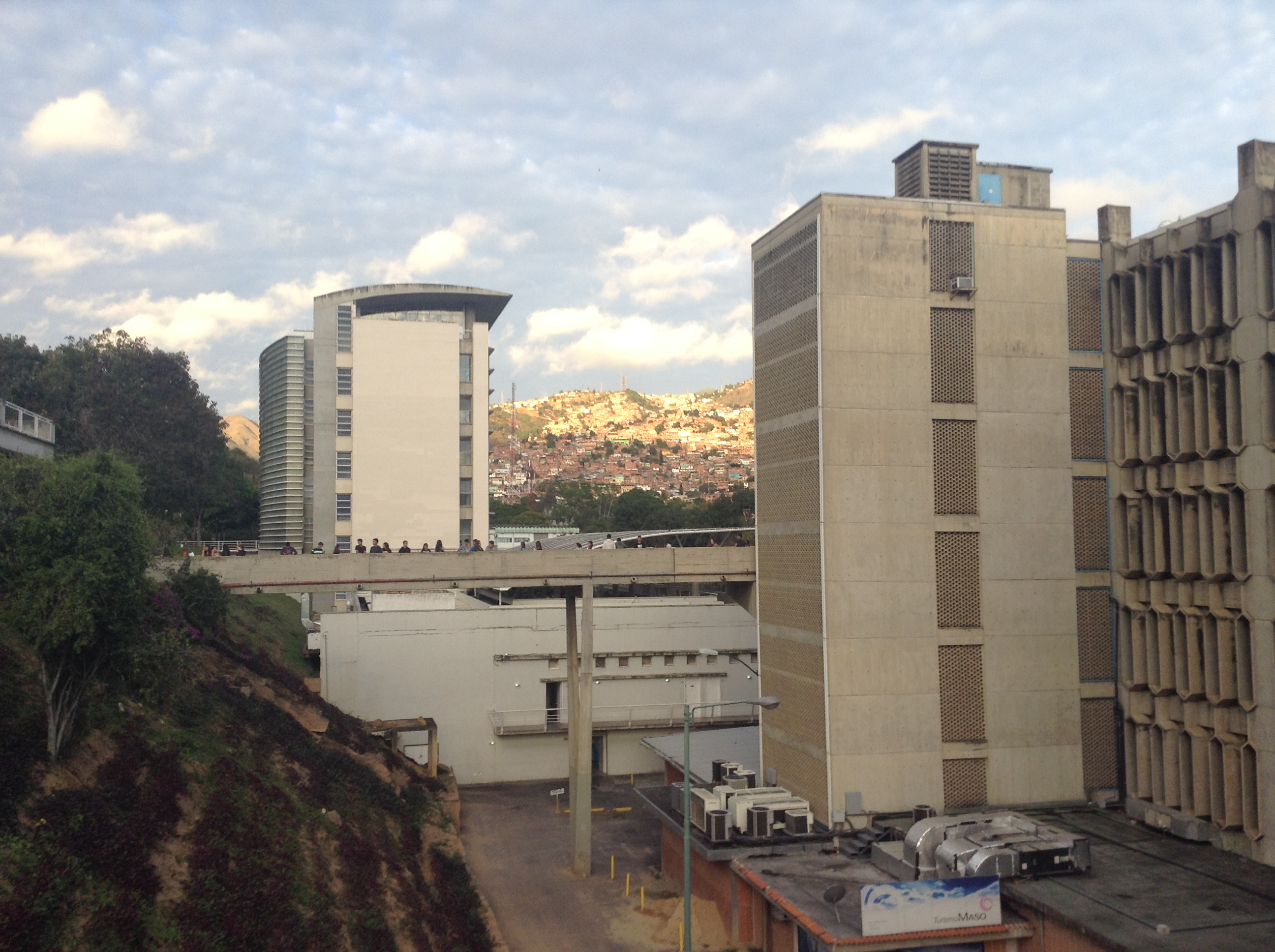
Andrés Bello Catholic University, Caracas

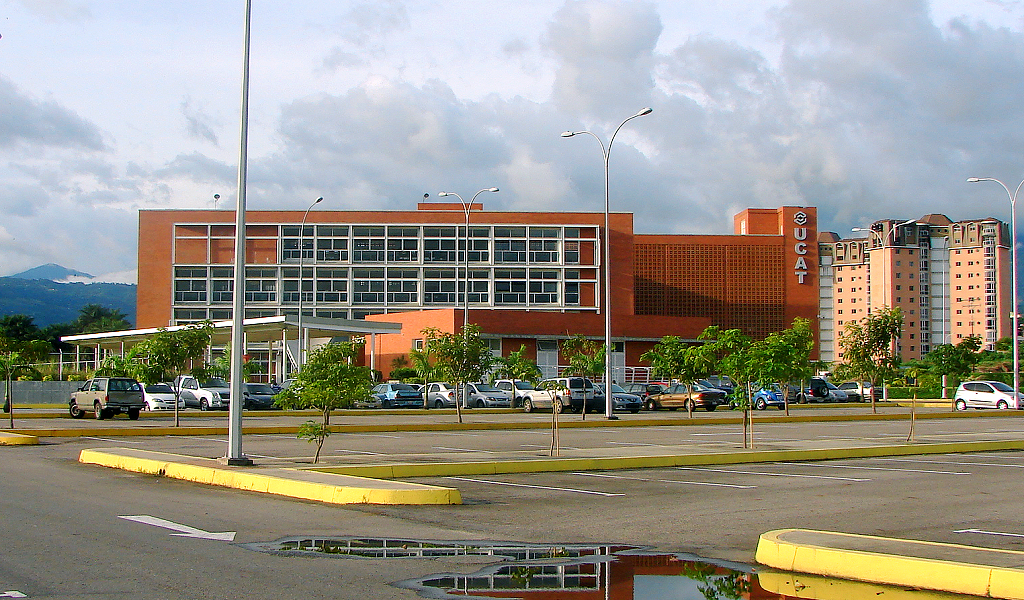
Catholic University of Tachira

- Jesuit college of Saint Francis Xavier in Mérida (1628–1767)
- Jesuit residence in Maracaibo (c.1728–1767)
- Seminario Interdiocesano in Caracas (1916–1953)
- St. Ignatius of Loyola College in Caracas (since 1923)
- Seminario Menor in Coro (1933–1953)
- Gonzaga College in Maracaibo (since 1945)
- Instituto Técnico Jesús Obrero in Caracas (since 1948)
- Andrés Bello Catholic University in Caracas (since 1953)
- Colegio Javier in Barquisimeto (1953–1983)
- Instituto Educativo Tamare in Zulia (1959–1964)
- Catholic University in Táchira (since 1962), initially an extension of Andrés Bello Catholic University
- Loyola College Gumilla in Ciudad Guayana (since 1965)
- Centro Gumilla in Caracas (since 1968)
- Jesus the Worker University Institute in Caracas (since 1997)

== Africa and Middle East ==
=== Algeria ===
- Orphelinates in Ben Aknoun (1844–1881) and Boufarik (1850–1871) near Algiers

=== Angola ===
- Jesuit college of the Holy Name of Jesus in Luanda (1584–1759, with interruption 1641–1648), now Ministry of Justice, National Printing House and Igreja de Jesus
- Jesuit college in M'banza-Kongo (1623–1669)

=== Armenia ===
- Jesuit mission in Yerevan (1684-after 1722)

=== Azerbaijan ===
- Jesuit mission in Shamakhi (1686-after 1722)
- Jesuit mission in Ganja (1703-after 1722)

=== Burundi ===
- Holy Spirit Lycée in Bujumbura (since 1952)

=== Cameroon ===
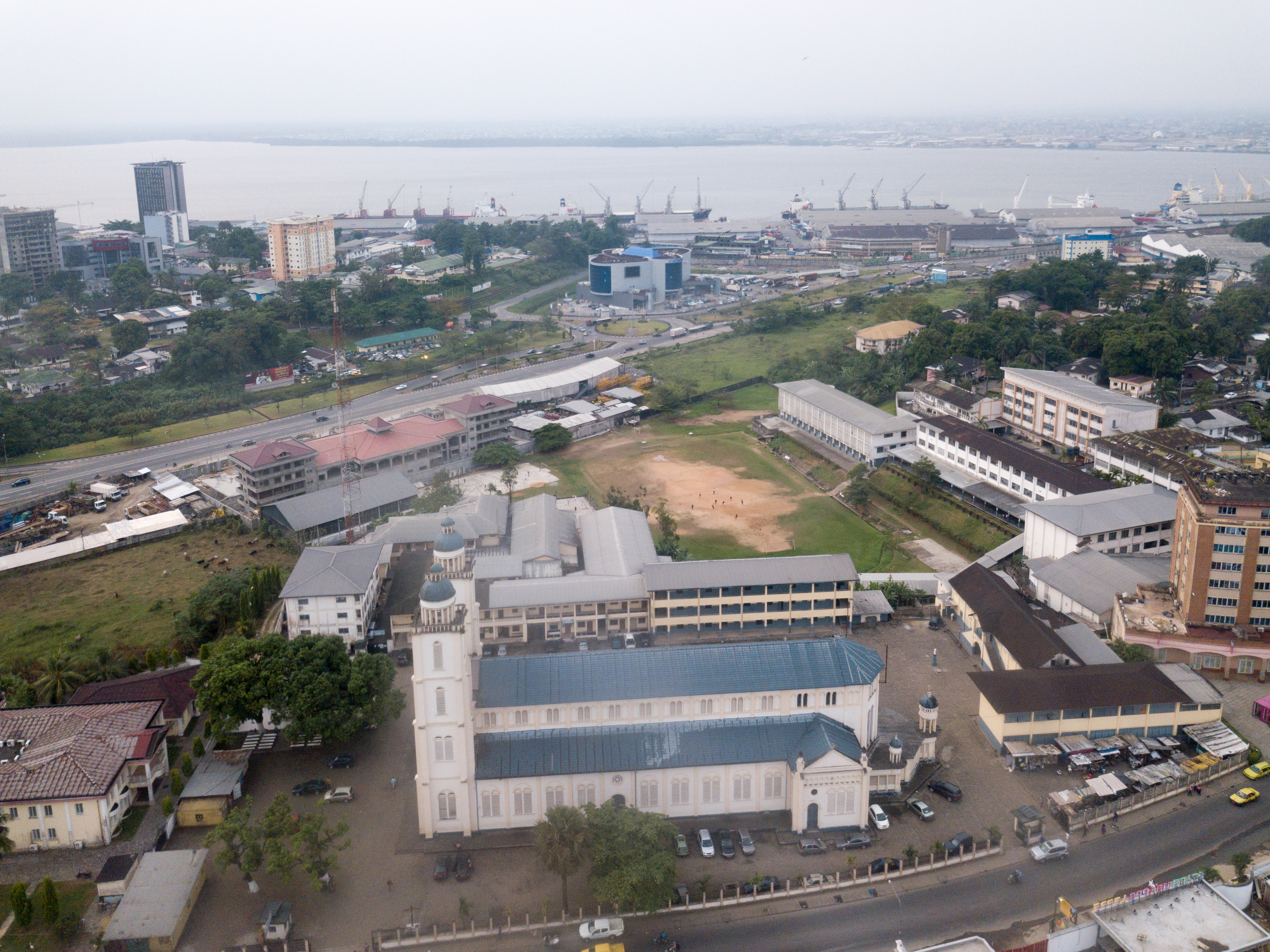
Collège Libermann, Douala

- Collège Libermann in Douala (since 1957)

=== Cape Verde ===
- Jesuit mission in Cape Verde (1604–1617)

=== Chad ===
- Centre for Studies and Training for Development in N'Djamena (since 1966)

=== Côte d'Ivoire ===
- African Institute for Economic and Social Development in Abidjan (since 1962), renamed in 2003 Centre for Research and Action for Peace

=== Democratic Republic of Congo ===
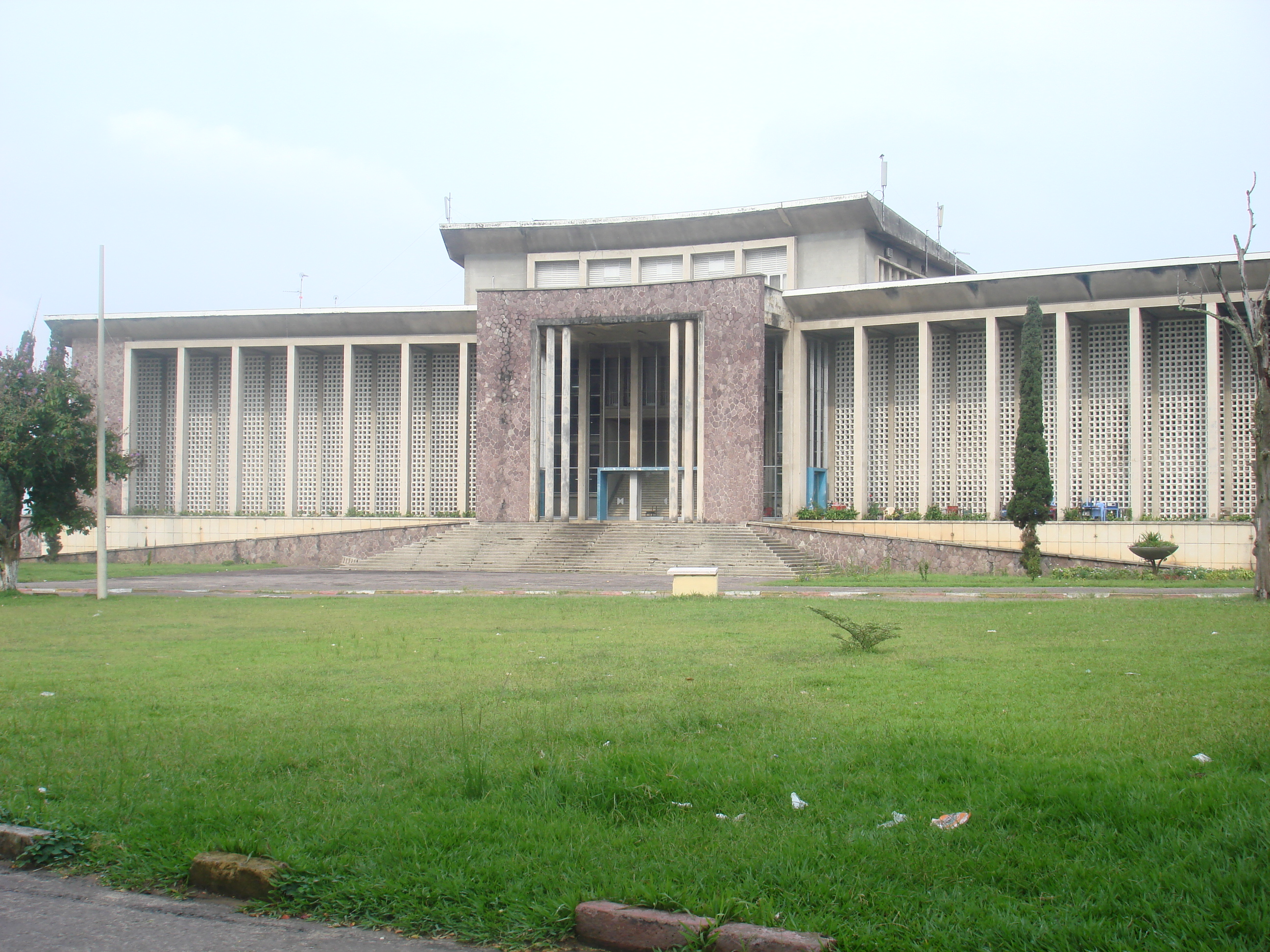
Lovanium University, Kinshasa

- Jesuit mission in Kwango (since 1893)
- Boboto College in Kinshasa (since 1937)
- Collège Alfajiri in Bukavu (since 1941)
- Collège Sadisana in Kikwit (since 1958)
- Action sociale CHECHE in Bukavu (since 1963)
- Collège Bonsomi in Kinshasa (since 1964)
- College N'Temo in Kasongo Lunda Territory (since 1966)
- Munzihirwa Centre in Kinshasa (since 1995)
- Collège Technique Mwapusukeni in Lubumbashi (since 2013)
- Loyola University of Congo in Kinshasa (since 2016)

=== Egypt ===
- Collège de la Sainte Famille in Cairo (since 1879)
- Jesuit Cultural Center in Alexandria (since 1953)

=== Equatorial Guinea ===
- Jesuit mission of Fernando Po on Bioko Island (1858–1872)

=== Ethiopia ===
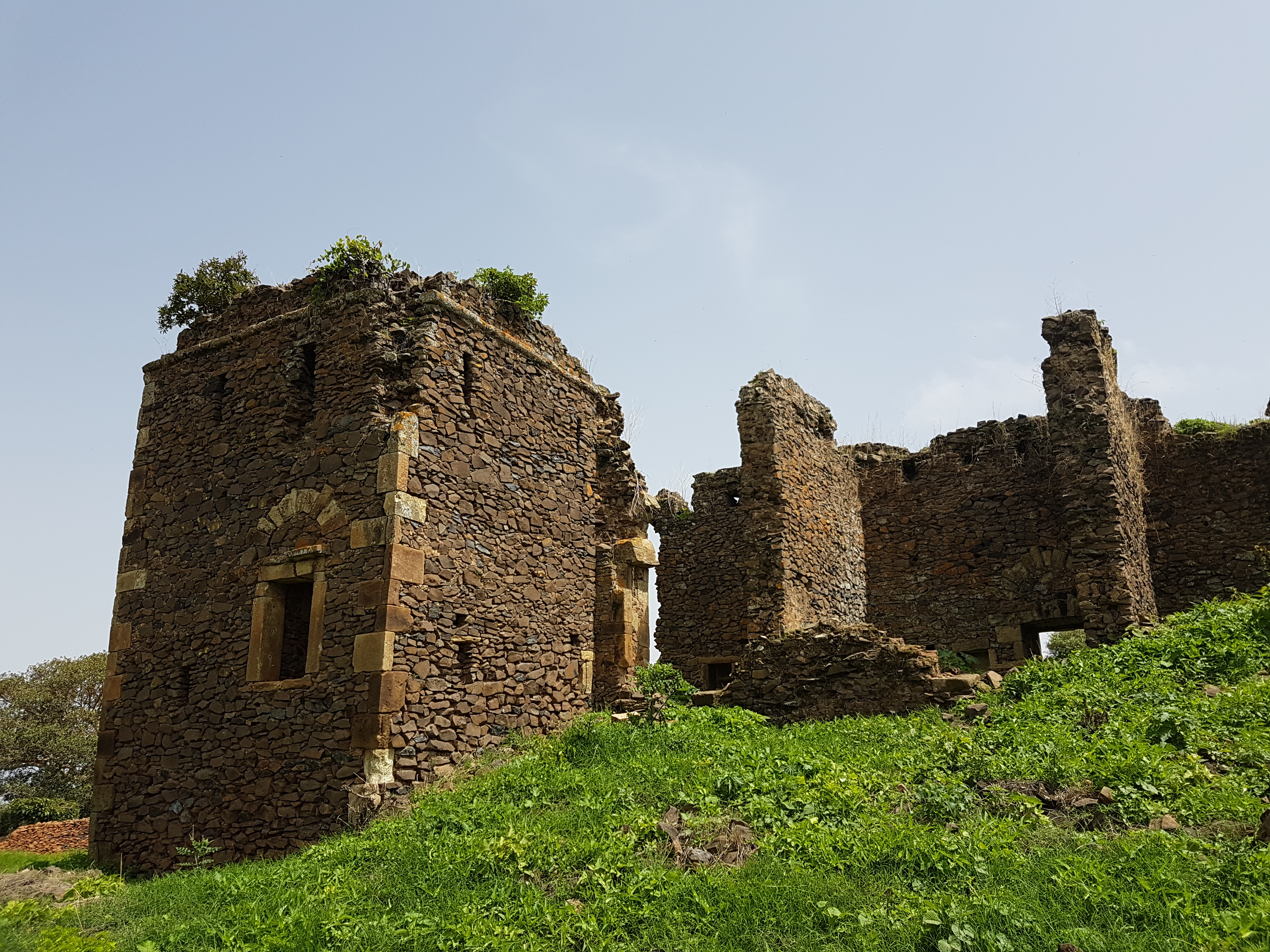
Jesuit mission, Gongora

- Jesuit complex in Gorgora (1608–1633), now Ruins of Gorgora Nova

=== Iran ===
- Jesuit mission in Hormuz (1549–1568)
- Jesuit mission in Isfahan (1647–1755), from 1651 in the New Julfa neighborhood

=== Iraq ===
- Baghdad College in Baghdad (1932–1969)
- Al-Hikma University in Baghdad (1956–1968), absorbed in 1969 by the University of Baghdad

=== Israel ===
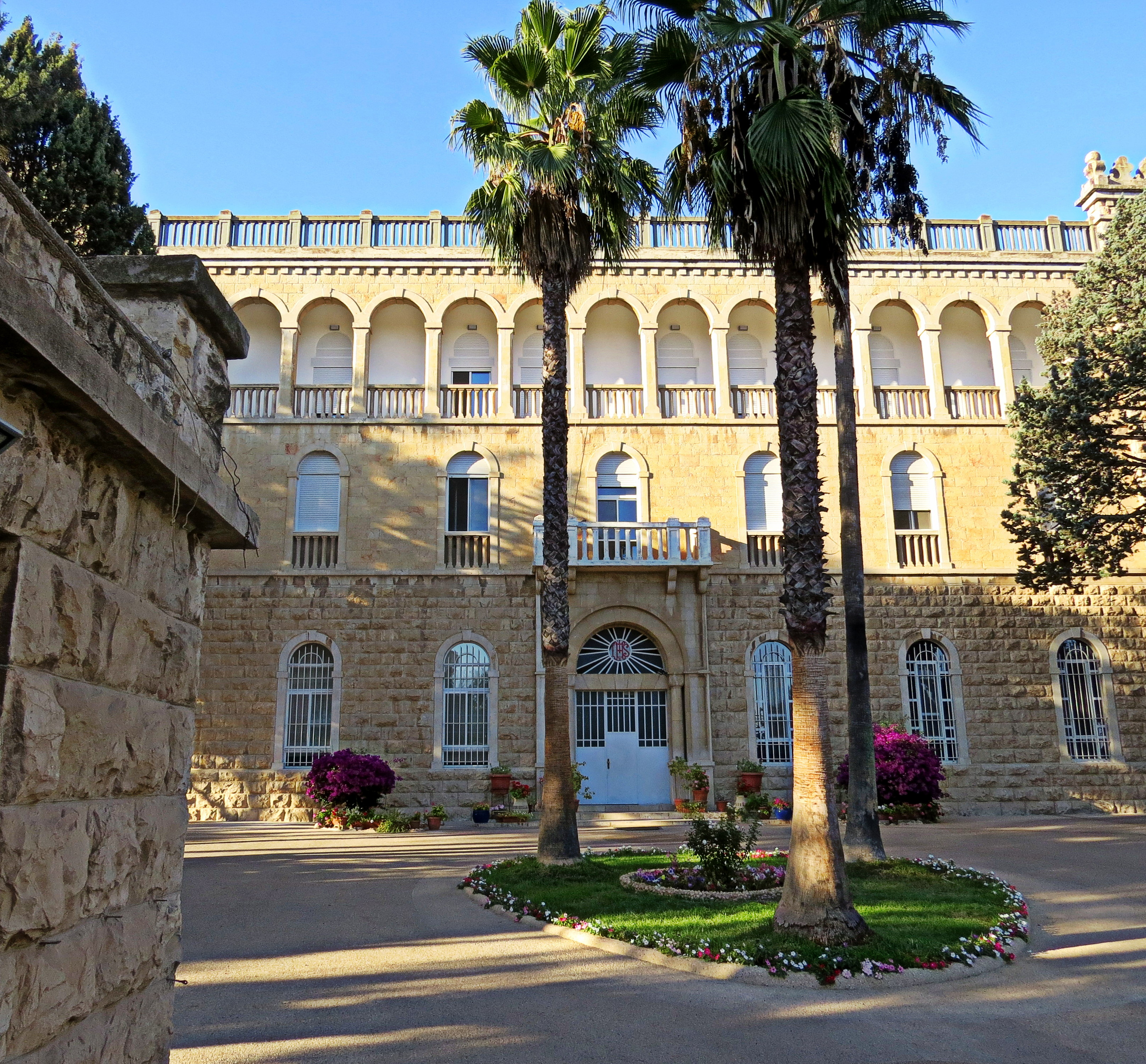
Biblical Institute, Jerusalem

- Pontifical Biblical Institute branch in Jerusalem (since 1927)

=== Kenya ===
- Hekima University College, Nairobi, Kenya (since 1984)

=== Lebanon ===
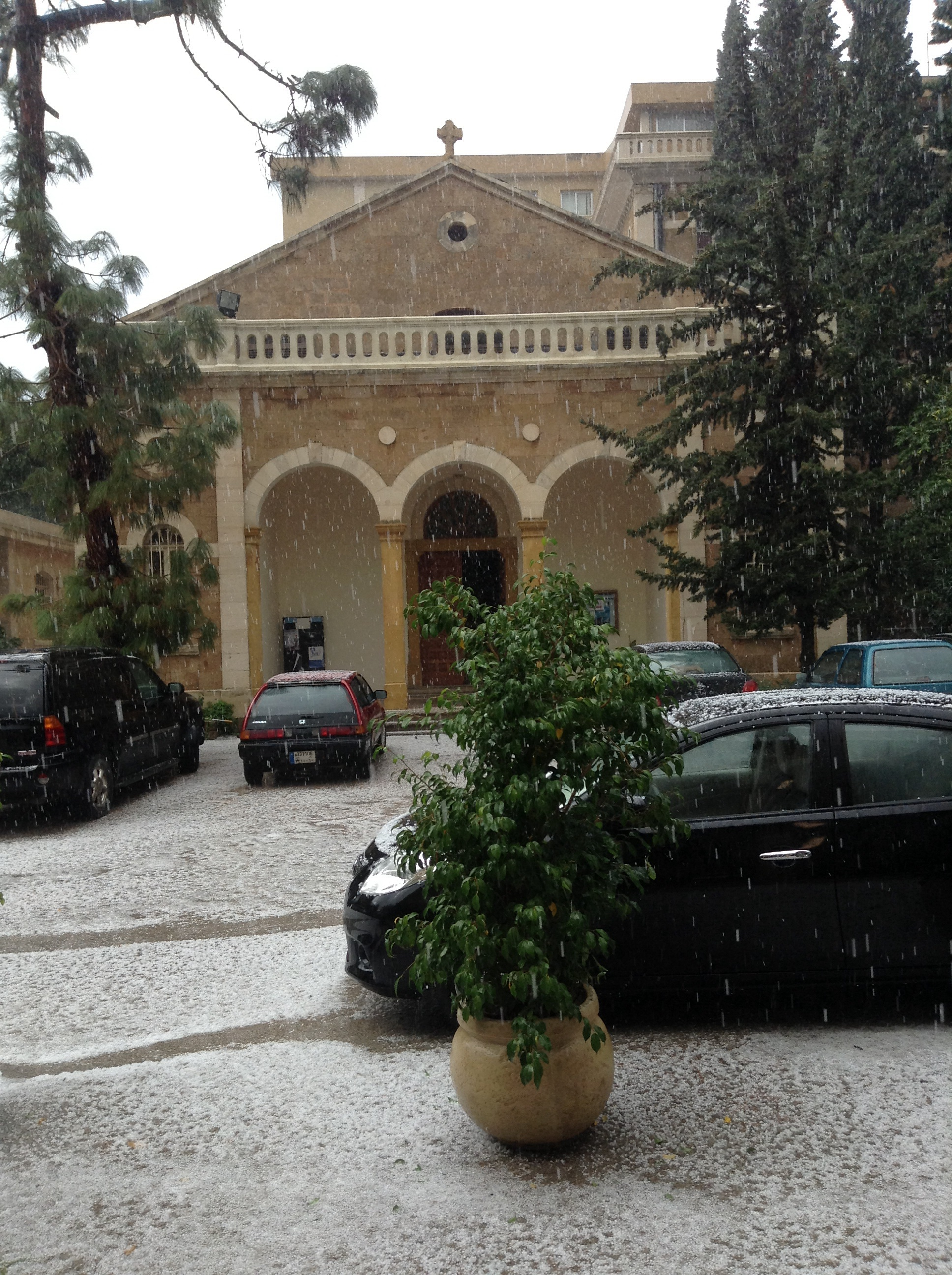
Saint Joseph University, Beirut

- Jesuit mission in Aintoura (1656–1784), now Collège Saint Joseph
- Jesuit residence in Zahlé (since the early 19th century)
- Jesuit residence in Bikfaya (since 1833)
- Jesuit school in Deir al-Qamar (1830s–1860)
- Jesuit college in Ghazir (1843–1875); precursor to Saint Joseph University
- Catholic Printing House in Beirut (since 1848)
- Collège Notre Dame de Jamhour in Baabda near Beirut (since 1850)
- Château Ksara winery in the Beqaa Valley (1857–1973)
- Jesuit monastery at Taanayel, near Zahlé (since 1860)
- Saint Joseph University in Beirut (since 1875)

=== Liberia ===
- Xavier Jesuit School in Wein Town, Paynesville (since 2007)

=== Madagascar ===
- College of Saint Michael, Amparibe in Antananarivo (since 1888)
- Ambohidempona Observatory in Antananarivo (1889–1923)
- Xavier College in Fianarantsoa (since 1952)
- Immaculate Conception College in Mananjary, Fianarantsoa (since 1955)
- Higher Vocational Agricultural School of Bevalala in Antananarivo (since 1957)
- Saint Paul Tsaramasoandro Philosophate in Antananarivo (since 1957)
- Saint Michael Higher Technical Institute, Amparibe in Antananarivo (since 1983)
- SAMIS-ESIC School of Information and Communication, Amparibem (since 2001)

=== Malawi ===
- Loyola Jesuit Secondary School in Kasungu District (since 2015)

=== Morocco ===
- Agricultural college in Temara (1951–1984)

=== Mozambique ===
- Jesuit college on the Island of Mozambique (1610–1759), now Palace and Chapel of São Paulo
- Jesuit college in Tete (1611–18th century)
- Jesuit seminary in Vila de Sena (1697–18th century)

=== Nigeria ===
- St. Francis Catholic Secondary School in Lagos (since 1990)
- Loyola Jesuit College in Abuja (since 1996)
- Jesuit Memorial College in Port Harcourt (since 2013)

Gonzaga Jesuit College (2021)

=== Rwanda ===
- St. Ignatius School in Kigali (since 2006)

=== South Africa ===
- Saint Aidan's College in Makhanda, Eastern Cape (1875–1973)

=== Syria ===
- Jesuit residence and school in Aleppo (mid-17th century), with satellite schools in Sidon (Lebanon) and Damascus
- Deir Wartan in Aleppo (since 1926)

=== Turkey ===
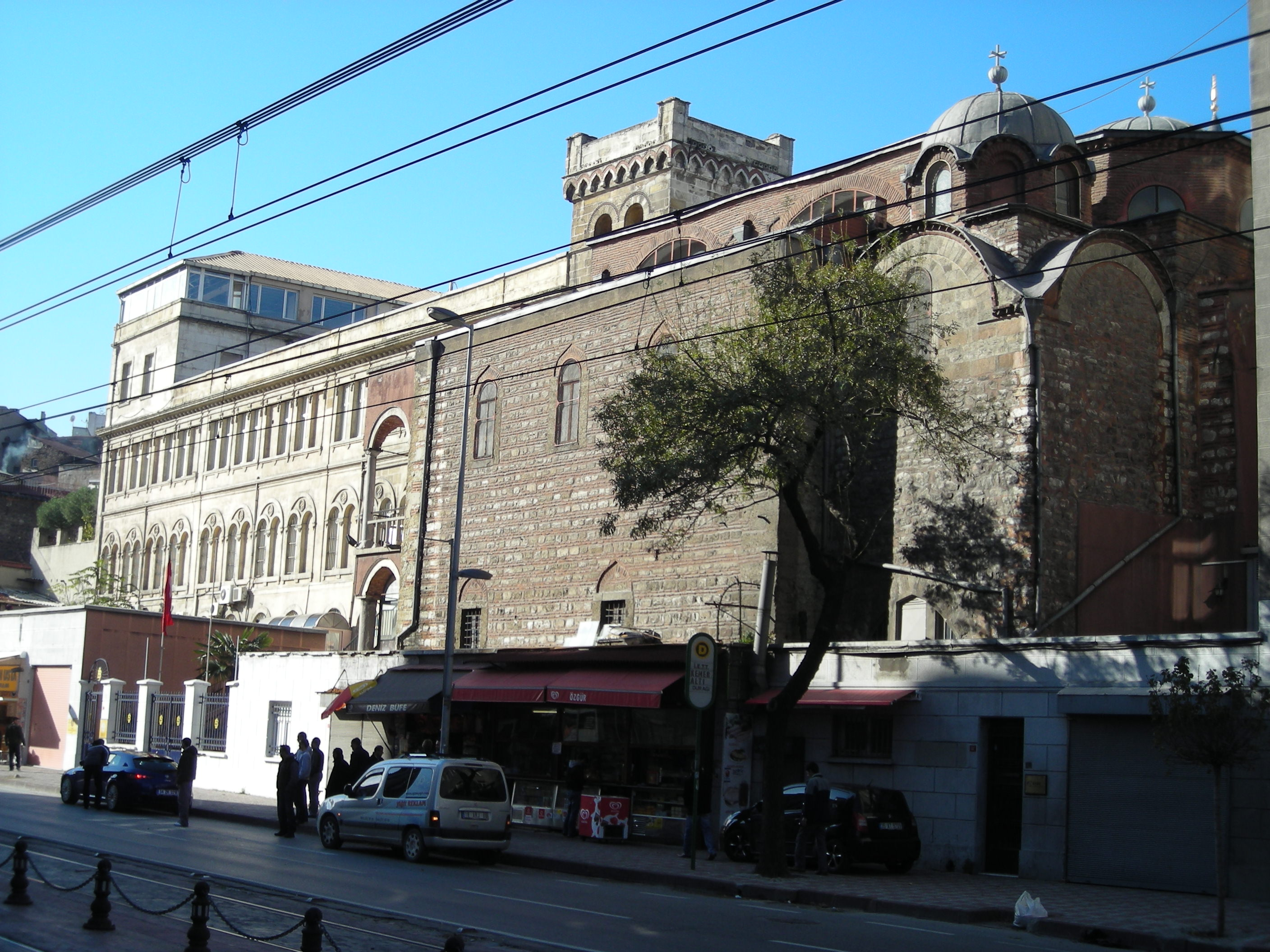
Saint Benedict, Istanbul

- Church of Saint Benedict in Istanbul (1583–1584, 1610–1628, 1673–1773)
- Jesuit mission in Edirne (1680–1706)
- Jesuit mission in Smyrna (18th century)

=== Uganda ===
- Ocer Campion Jesuit College in Gulu (since 2010)

=== United Arab Emirates ===
- Saint Joseph University in Dubai (since 2008)

=== Zambia ===
Canisius School, Chikuni Mission

- Chikuni Mission in Monze District (since 1905), now Canisius Secondary School
- Charles Lwanga College of Education in Chisekesi between Monze and Pemba (since 1959)
- Kasisi Agricultural Training Centre near Lusaka (since 1974)
- Jesuit Centre for Theological Reflection in Lusaka (since 1988)

=== Zimbabwe ===
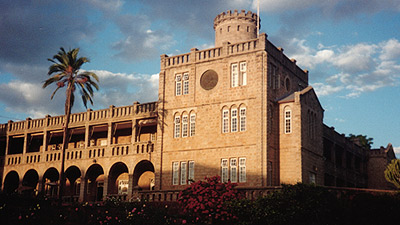
St George's College, Harare

- St. George's College in Harare (since 1896)
- Mt St Mary's Mission School in Mashonaland East Province (1954–1994)
- Saint Ignatius College in Harare (since 1962)
- St. Peter's Kubatana in Harare (since 1963)
- Silveira House in Chishawasha near Harare (since 1964)
- Visitation-Makumbi High School near Harare (since 1973)
- Arrupe College in Harare (since 1994)
- St. Rupert Mayer's High School in Makonde District (since 2000)
- St. Paul's High School, Musami in Murehwa District

== South Asia ==
=== Bangladesh ===
- St Francis Xavier's Green Herald International School in Dhaka (since 1912)

=== Bhutan ===
- Sherubtse College in Kanglung (1966–2003)

=== India ===
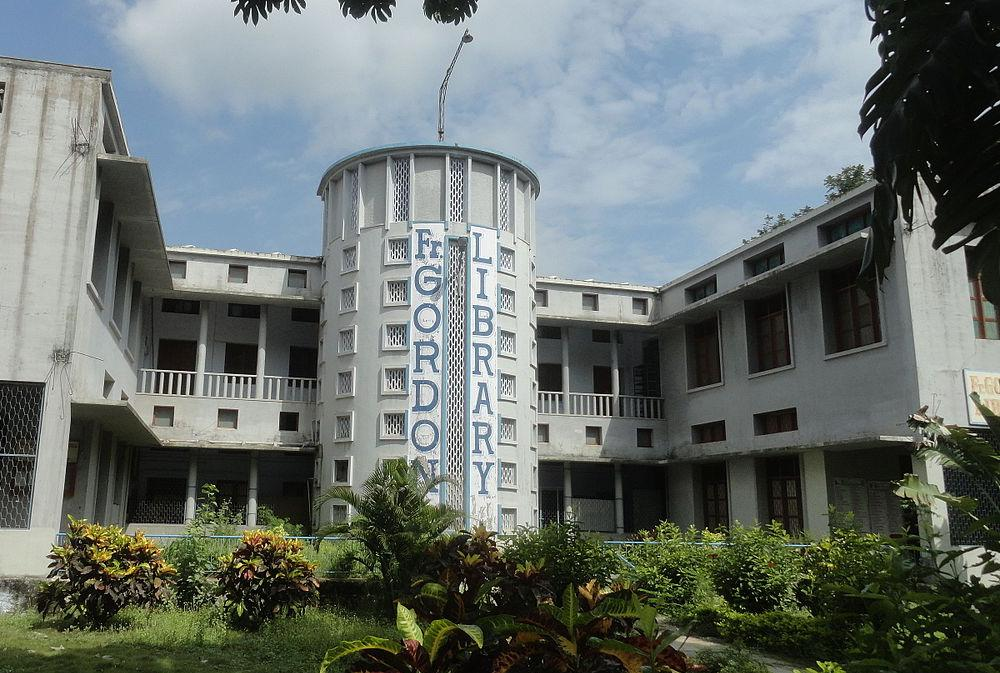
Andhra Loyola College, Vijayawada

==== Andhra Pradesh ====
- Andhra Loyola College in Vijayawada (since 1953)
- Loyola High School, Vinukonda in Guntur (since 1960)
- Loyola Public School in Guntur (since 1964)
- St. John's High School, Amalapuram in Vijayawada (since 1968)
- Loyola High School in Hindupur (since 1990)
- St. Xavier's High School in Darsi (since 1993)
- St. Xavier's College of Education in Hindupur (since 2007)
- Loyola High School, KD Peta in Golugonda (since 2008)

==== Bihar ====
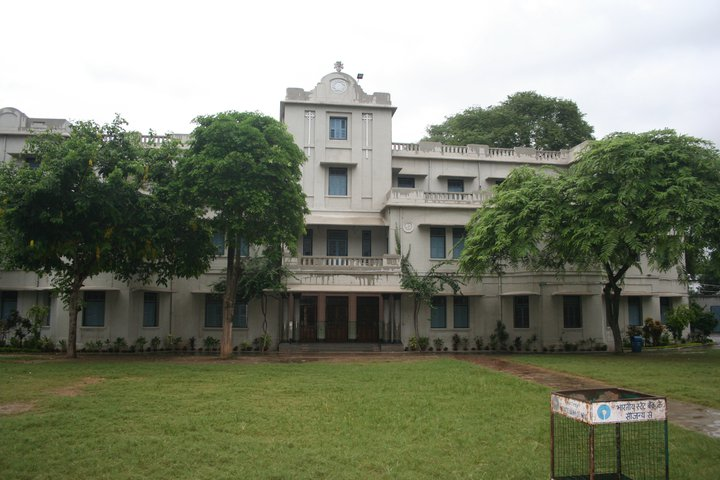
St Xavier's High School, Patna

- St. Michael's High School in Patna (since 1858)
- Khrist Raja High School in Bettiah (since 1927)
- St. Xavier's High School in Patna (since 1940)
- Bihar Dalit Development Organization in Barh, Patna district (since 1982)
- St. Xavier's College of Education in Patna (since 1988)
- St. Xavier's Higher Secondary School in Bettiah (since 1998)
- St. Xavier's College in Patna (since 2009)

==== Dadra and Nagar Haveli and Daman and Diu ====
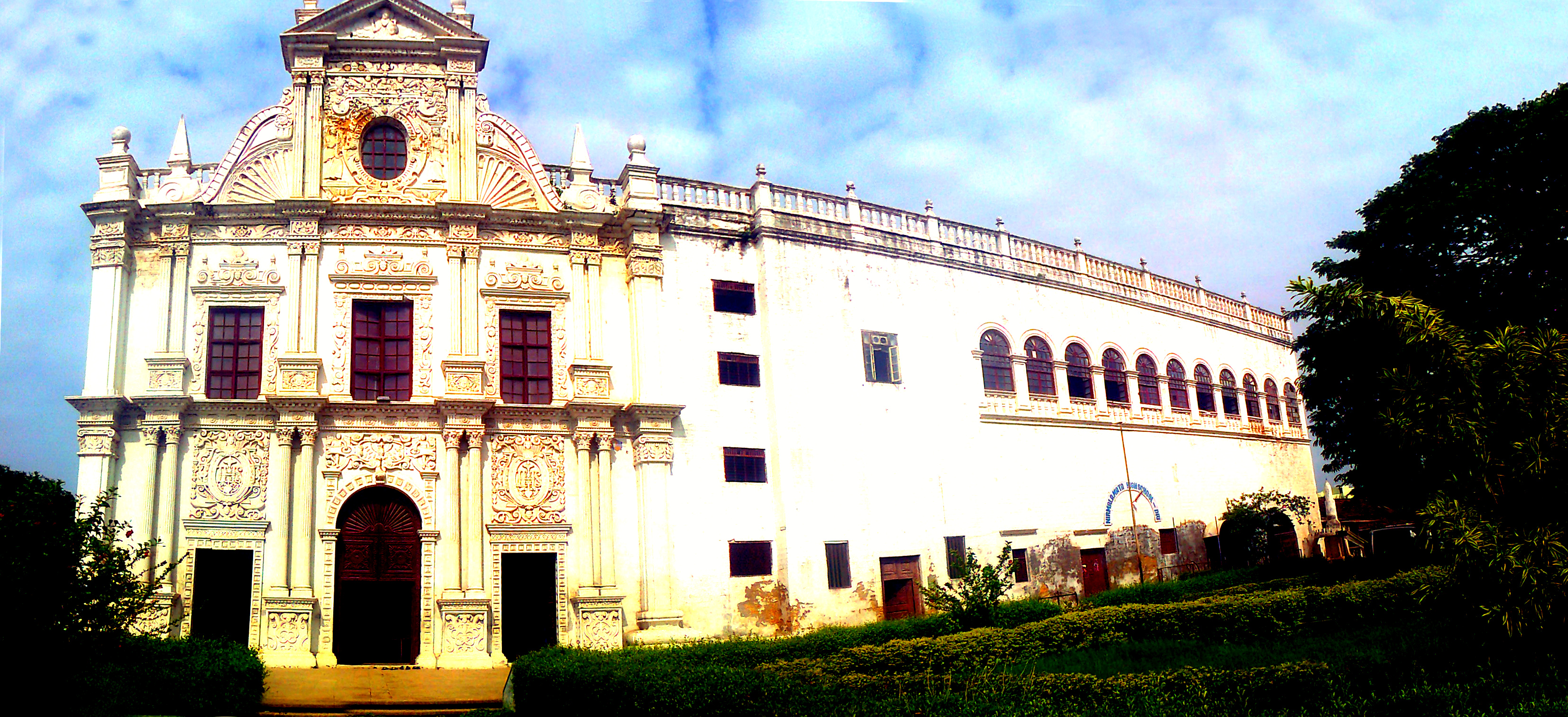
St Paul's Church, Diu

- Jesuit church of Saint Paul, a former mosque, in Daman (1558–1759)
- St. Paul's Church, Diu (1601–1759)

==== Delhi ====
- St. Xavier's School (since 1960)
- Indian Social Institute (since 1963); from 1961 to 1963 in Pune
- Vidyajyoti College of Theology (since 1972), previously in (West) Bengal since 1879
- St. Xavier's School, Rohini (since 1990)

==== Goa ====
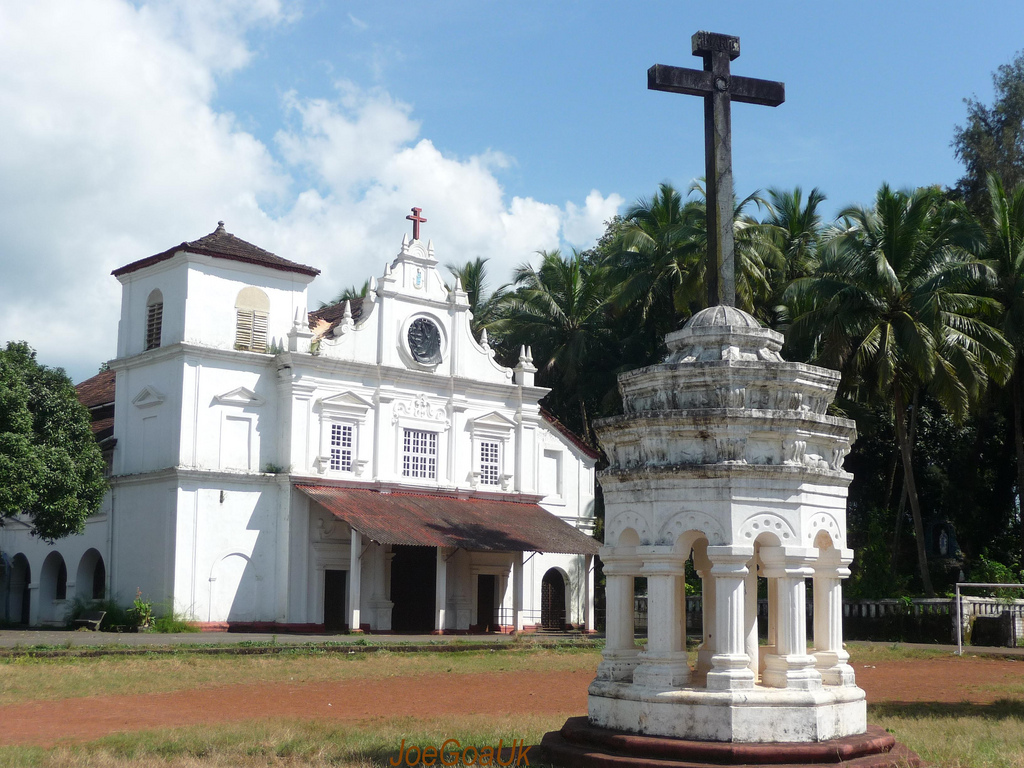
Church of Our Lady of the Snows, Rachol

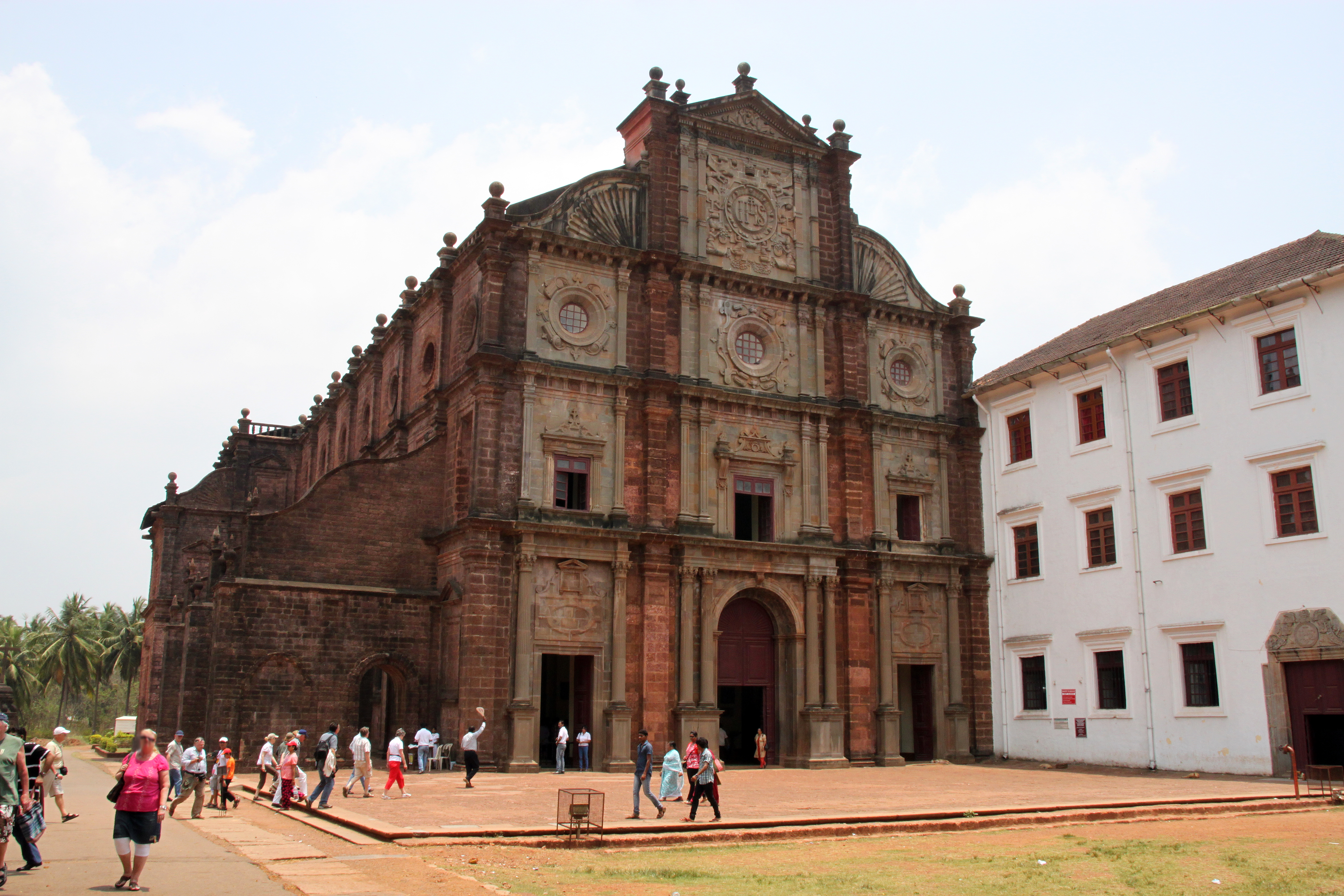
Basilica of Bom Jesus, Old Goa

- Saint Paul's College in Old Goa (1542–1767), the first Jesuit educational institution
- Chapel of Saint Francis Xavier in Old Goa (1548–1759)
- Holy Spirit Church, Margao (1564–1759)
- Church of Our Lady of the Snows in Rachol (1565–1759)
- Basilica of Bom Jesus in Old Goa (1594–1759), which holds the mortal remains of Francis Xavier
- Loyola High School in Margao (since 1944)
- Saint Britto High School in Mapusa (since 1946)
- St. Xavier's College, Mapusa, Goa in Mapusa (since 1963)
- Thomas Stephens Konknni Kendr in Porvorim (since 1982)

==== Gujarat ====
St Xavier's High School, Ahmedabad

- St. Xavier's High School, Loyola Hall in Ahmedabad (since 1934)
- St. Xavier's High School, Mirzapur in Ahmedabad (since 1935)
- St. Xavier's College in Ahmedabad (since 1955)
- St. Xavier's High School in Surat (since 1963)
- St. Xavier's Social Service Society in Ahmedabad (since 1976)
- Unteshwari Mata Mandir shrine in Kadi (since 1982)

==== Jharkhand ====
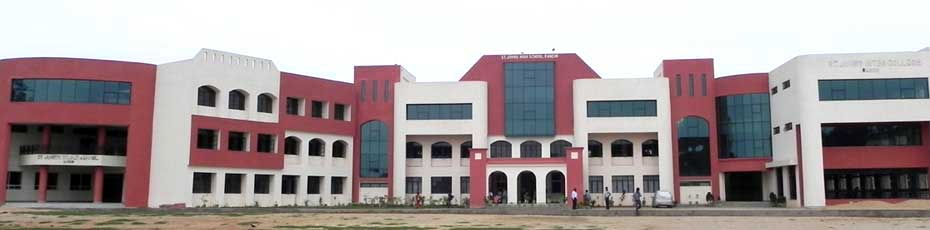
St John's High School, Ranchi

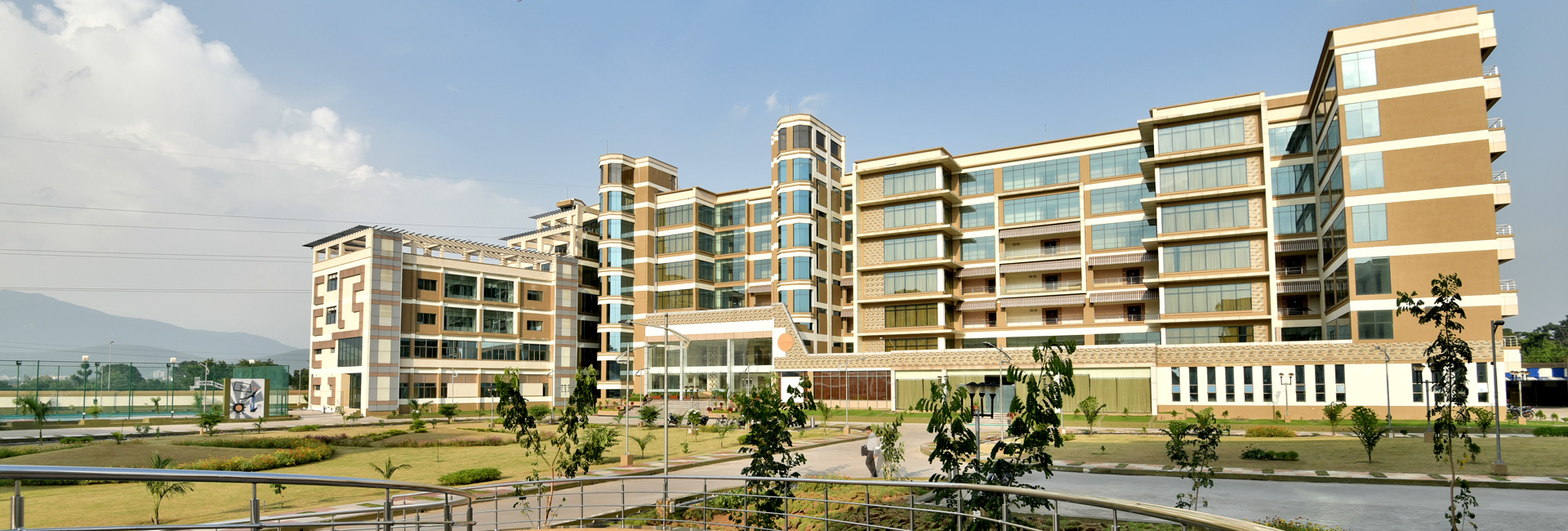
XLRI, Jamshedpur

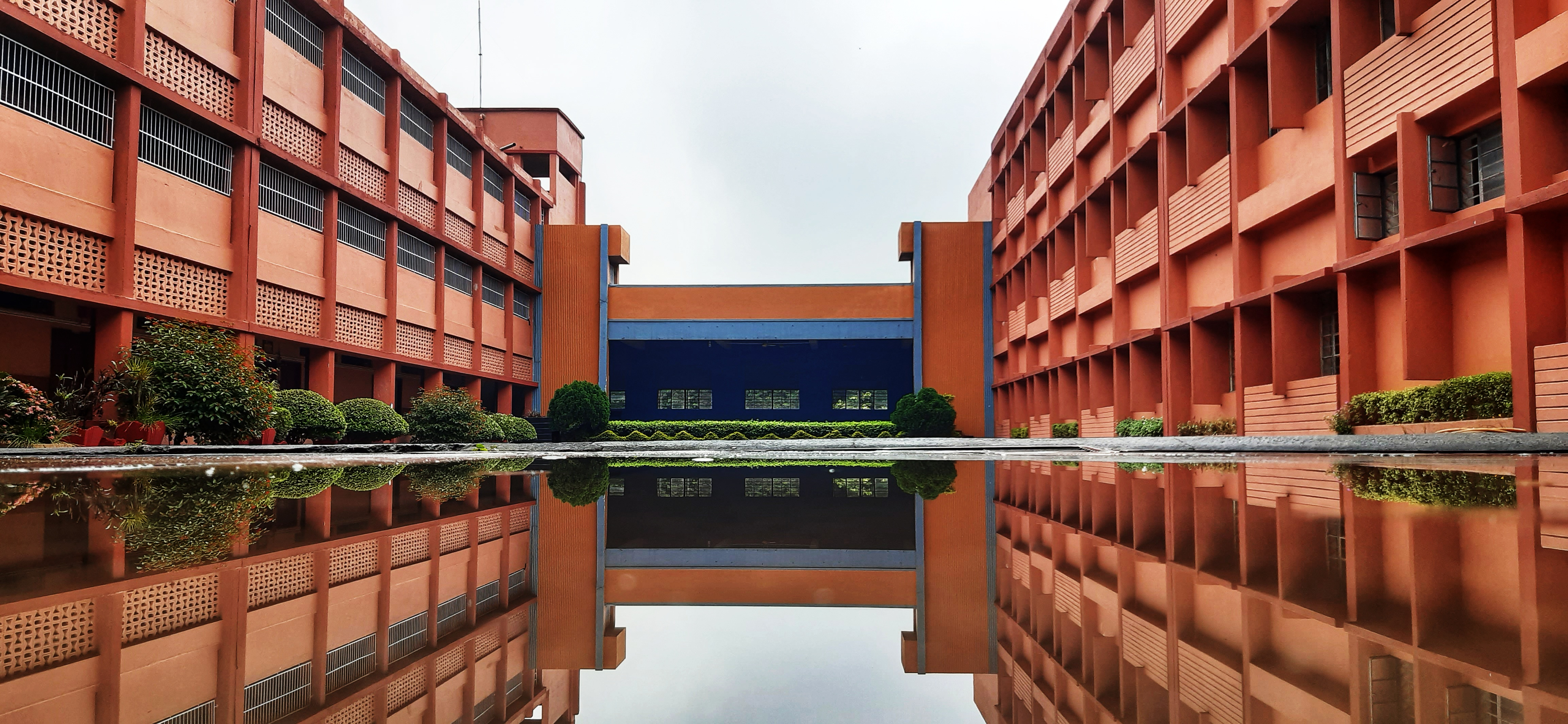
St Xavier's School, Bokaro Steel City

- St. John's High School in Ranchi (since 1887)
- St. Xavier's College in Ranchi (since 1944)
- Loyola School in Jamshedpur (since 1947)
- XLRI - Xavier School of Management in Jamshedpur (since 1949)
- Xavier Institute of Social Service in Ranchi (since 1955)
- De Nobili Schools named after Roberto de Nobili in Dhanbad district and Bokaro district:
  - De Nobili School, FRI in Dhanbad (since 1956)
  - De Nobili School, Sindri in Dhanbad (since 1963)
  - De Nobili School, Sijua in Dhanbad (since 1975)
  - De Nobili School, Mugma in Nirsa (since 1977)
  - De Nobili School, Bhuli in Dhanbad (since 2009)
  - De Nobili School, Maithon in Nirsa
  - De Nobili School CTPS in Chandrapura, Bokaro district
- St. Xavier's School in Sahibganj (since 1957)
- St. Xavier's School in Ranchi (since 1960)
- St. Xavier's School in Bokaro Steel City (since 1966)
- Loyola College of Education, Jamshedpur (since 1976), until 1992 as a college of XLRI
- De Nobili School, CMRI in Dhanbad (since 1977)
- St. Xavier's English School in Chakradharpur (since 1998)
- St. Xavier's College in Dumka (since 2011)
- Loyola Collegiate School in Jamshedpur (since 2015)

==== Karnataka ====
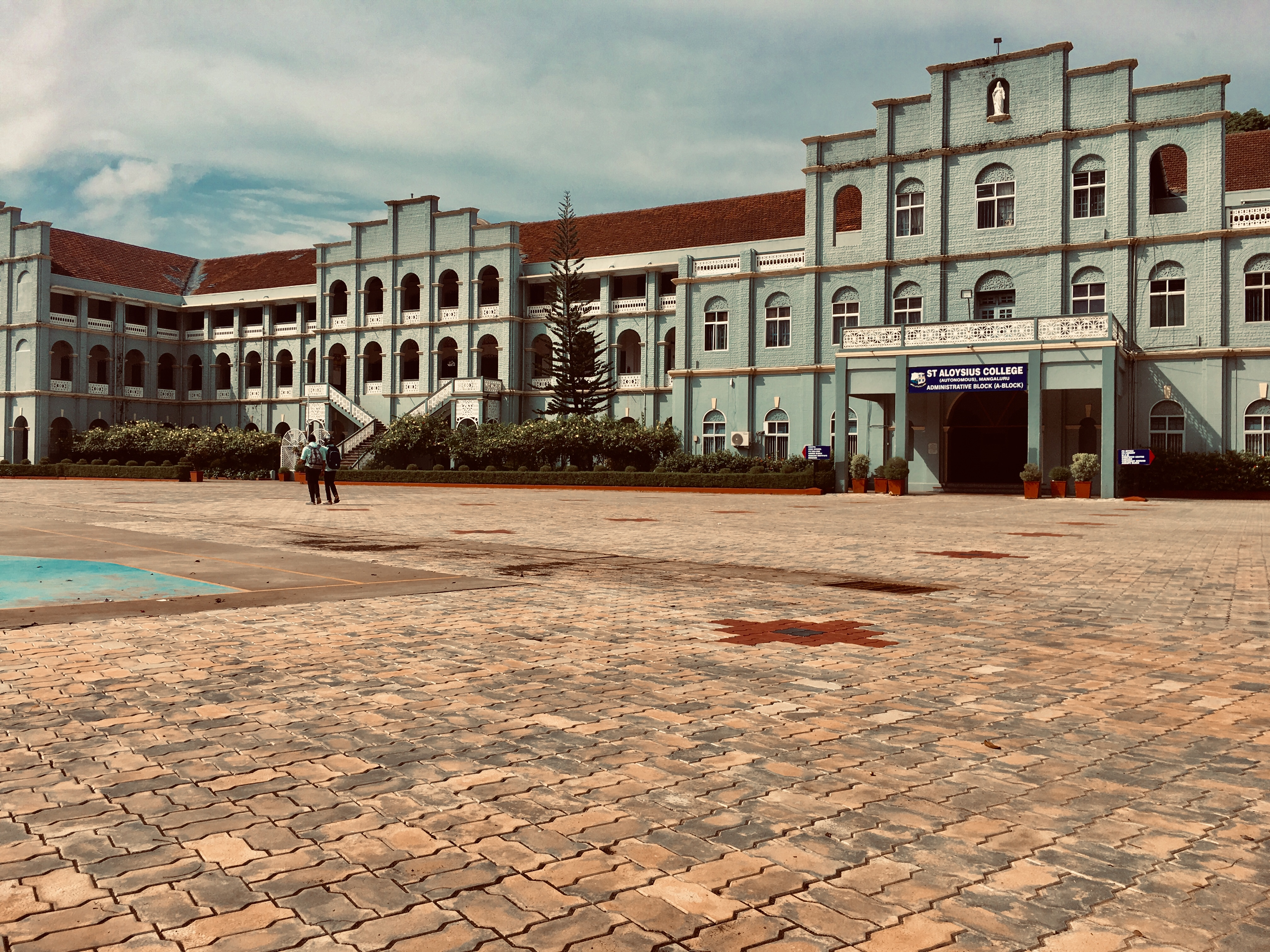
St Aloysius College, Mangalore

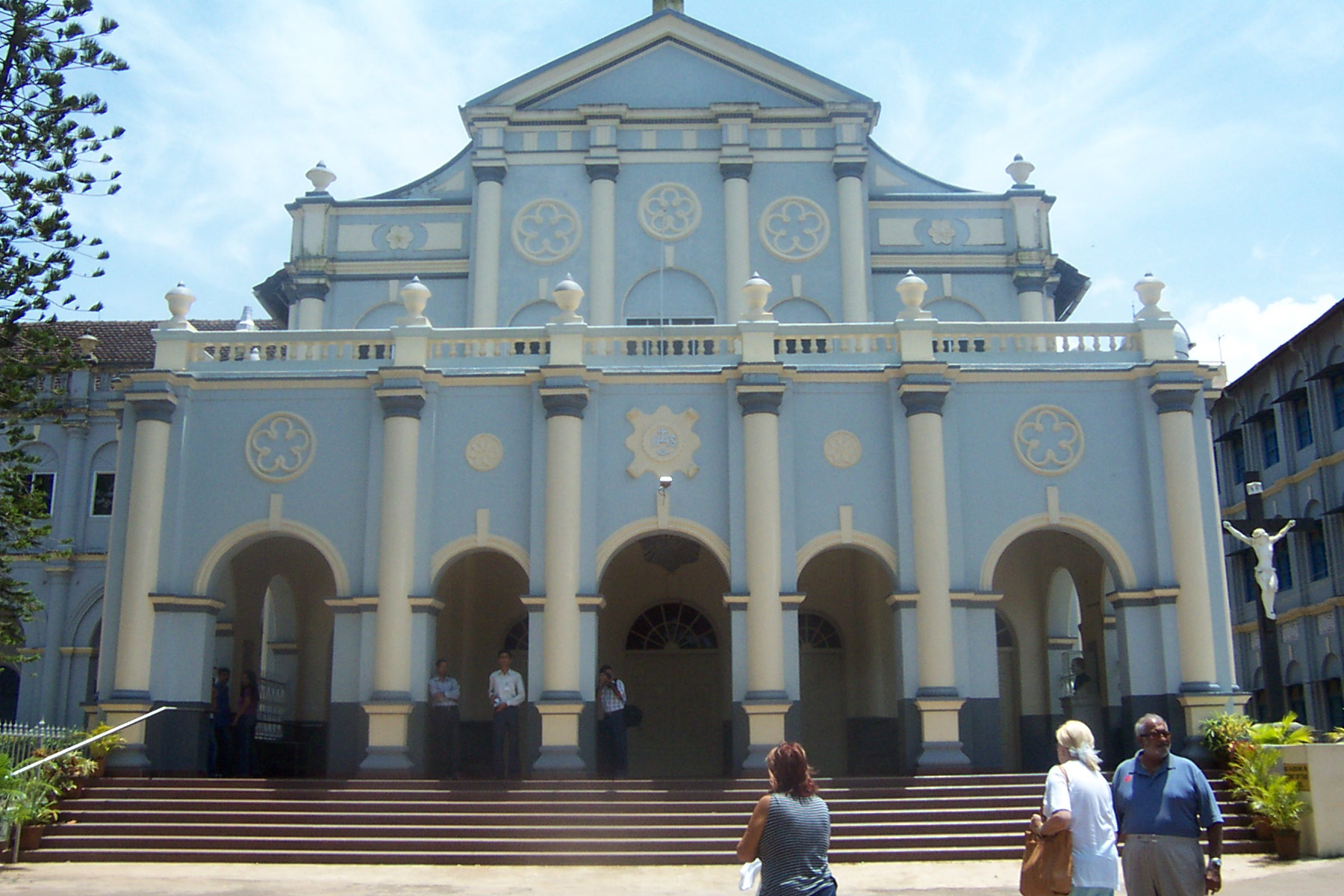
St Aloysius College church, Mangalore

- St. Paul's School in Belgaum (since 1856)
- The St. Joseph's Institutions in Bangalore:
  - St. Joseph's Boy's High School (since 1858)
  - St. Joseph's College (Autonomous), Bangalore (since 1937)
  - St. Joseph's Indian High School (since 1937)
  - St. Joseph's College of Commerce (Autonomous) (since 1972)
  - St. Joseph's Institute of Management (since 1968)
  - St. Joseph's Pre-University College (since 2001)
  - St. Joseph's College of Law (since 2017)
- St. Aloysius College in Mangalore (since 1880), including St. Aloysius Chapel
- St. Joseph's School in Hassan (since 1956)
- St. Aloysius Evening College in Mangalore (since 1966)
- St. Joseph's Institute of Management in Bangalore (since 1968)
- St. Aloysius Industrial Training Institute in Mangalore (since 1981)
- St. Joseph School, Anekal in Anekal near Bangalore (since 1992), and its prep school St. Joseph's Pre-University College (since 2010)
- Indian Social Institute in Bangalore (since 1993)
- Loyola School & Pre-University College in Mundgod (since 1994)
- Xavier School in Manvi (since 2004)
- St. Joseph's Community College in Bangalore (since 2005)
- St. Aloysius Pre-University College in Harihar (since 2005)
- St. Aloysius Institute of Education in Mangalore (since 2006)
- St. Joseph's College in Hassan (since 2009)
- Loyola Pre-University College in Manvi (since 2010)
- St. Xavier's Pre-University College in Gulbarga (since 2010)
- Loyola College in Manvi (since 2012)

==== Kerala ====
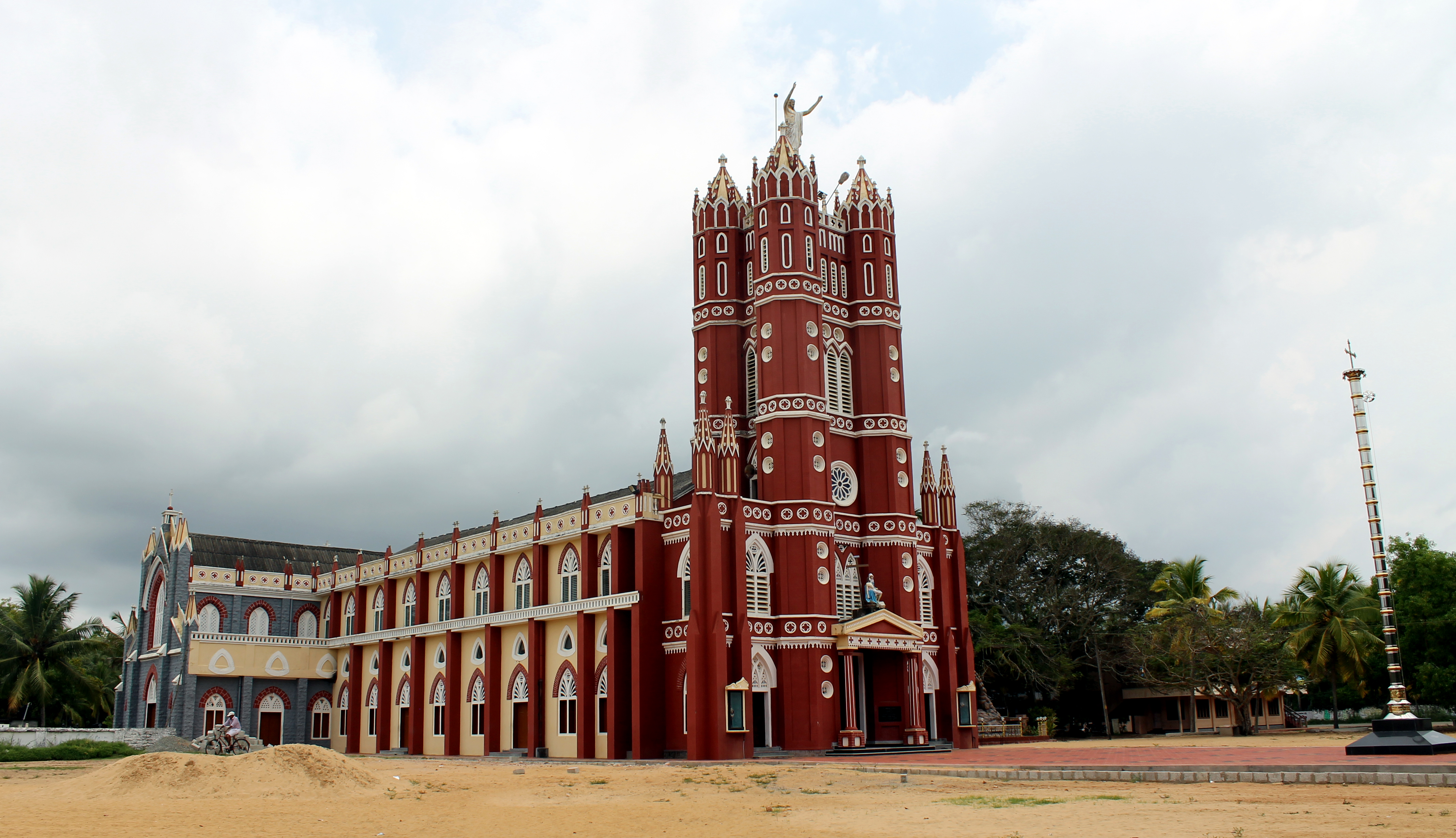
St Ignatius Church, Thiruvananthapuram

- Vaipikotta Seminary near Kochi (1577–1759)
- Headquarters of Malabar Vice-Province in Kochi (1601–1759)
- Old Church of Saint Thomas in Pala (1702–1759)
- St. Michael's School in Kannur (since 1887)
- Loyola School in Thiruvananthapuram (since 1961)
- AKJM Public School in Kanjirappally (since 1961)
- Loyola College of Social Sciences in Thiruvananthapuram (since 1963)
- St. Xavier's College, Thumba in Thiruvananthapuram (since 1964)
- St Ignatius Church in Thiruvananthapuram (since 1986)

==== Madhya Pradesh ====
- Campion School in Bhopal (since 1965)
- Xavier Institute of Development Action and Studies (XIDAS) in Jabalpur (since 1995)

==== Maharashtra ====
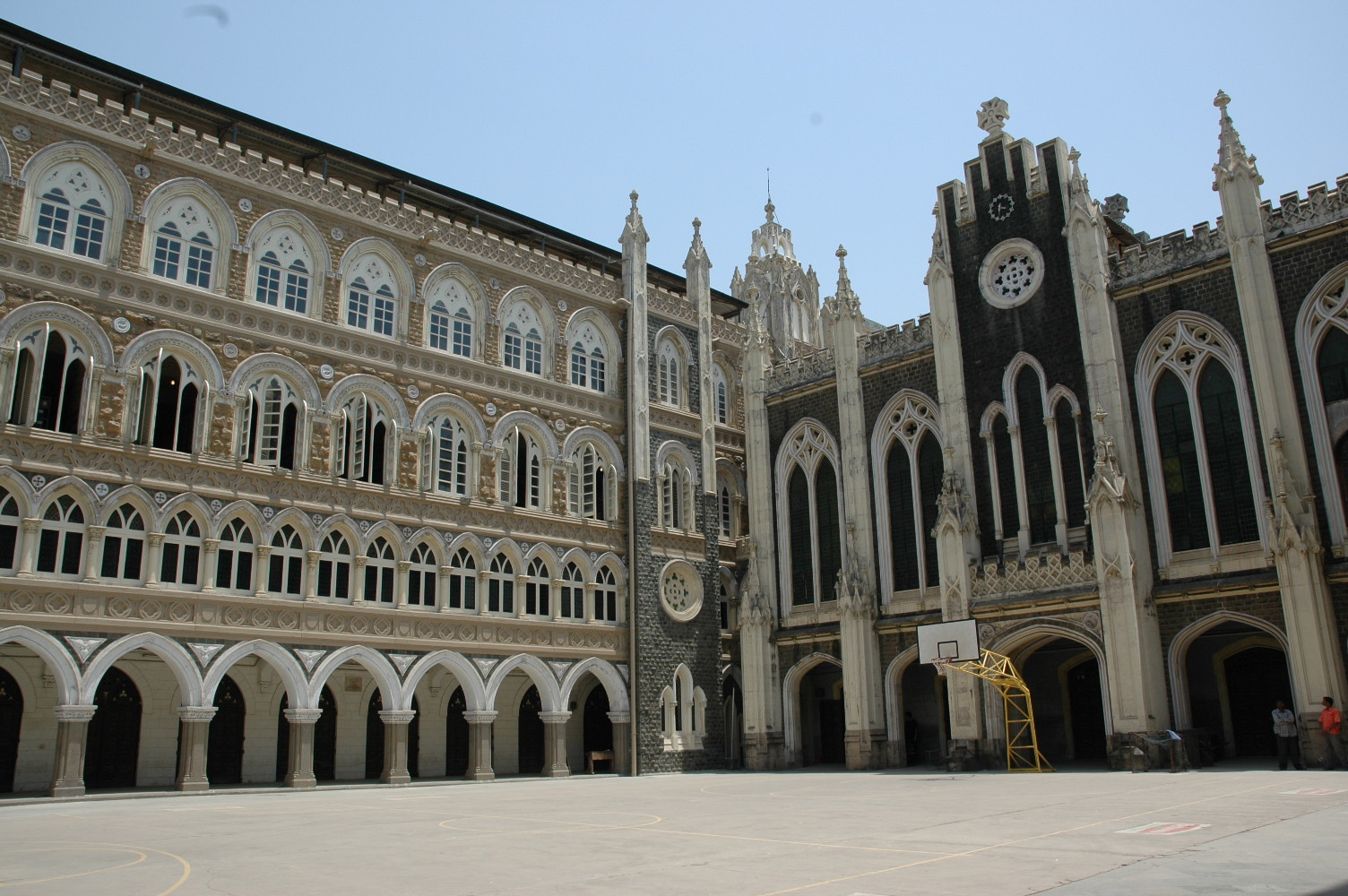
St Xavier's College, Mumbai

- Jesuit college in Vasai near Mumbai (1560–1739), now Fort Bassein site
- Jesuit schools in Bandra (1570–1759) and at Revdanda fort in Chaul
- St. Stanislaus High School in Bandra, Mumbai (since 1863)
- St. Mary's High School SSC in Mumbai (since 1864)
- St. Mary's School ICSE in Mumbai (since 1864)
- St. Vincent's High School in Pune (since 1867)
- St. Xavier's College in Mumbai (since 1869)
- St. Xavier's High School, Fort in Mumbai (since 1869)
- St. Mary's School, Sangamner in Ahmednagar (since 1892)
- St. Xavier's Technical Institute in Mumbai (since 1937)
- Campion School in Mumbai (since 1943)
- Holy Family High School in Mumbai (since 1945)
- Dnyanmata Vidyalaya, Sangamner in Ahmednagar (since 1948)
- St. Xavier's Institute of Education in Mumbai (since 1953)
- Papal Seminary and Jnana Deepa, Institute of Philosophy and Theology in Pune (since 1955)
- St. Xavier's Boys' Academy, Mumbai in Mumbai (since 1957)
- St. Xavier's School in Kolhapur (since 1957)
- St. Joseph's Technical Institute in Pune (since 1959)
- Loyola High School in Pune (since 1961)
- St. Xavier's High School in Nashik (since 1961)
- House of Love in Mumbai (since 1962)
- St. Vincent College of Commerce in Pune (since 1970)
- Prabodhan Vidyalaya School in Amravati (since 1983)
- Xavier Institute of Engineering in Mumbai (since 2005)
- St. Xavier's English Medium School (ICSE) in Manickpur (since 2006)

==== Odisha ====
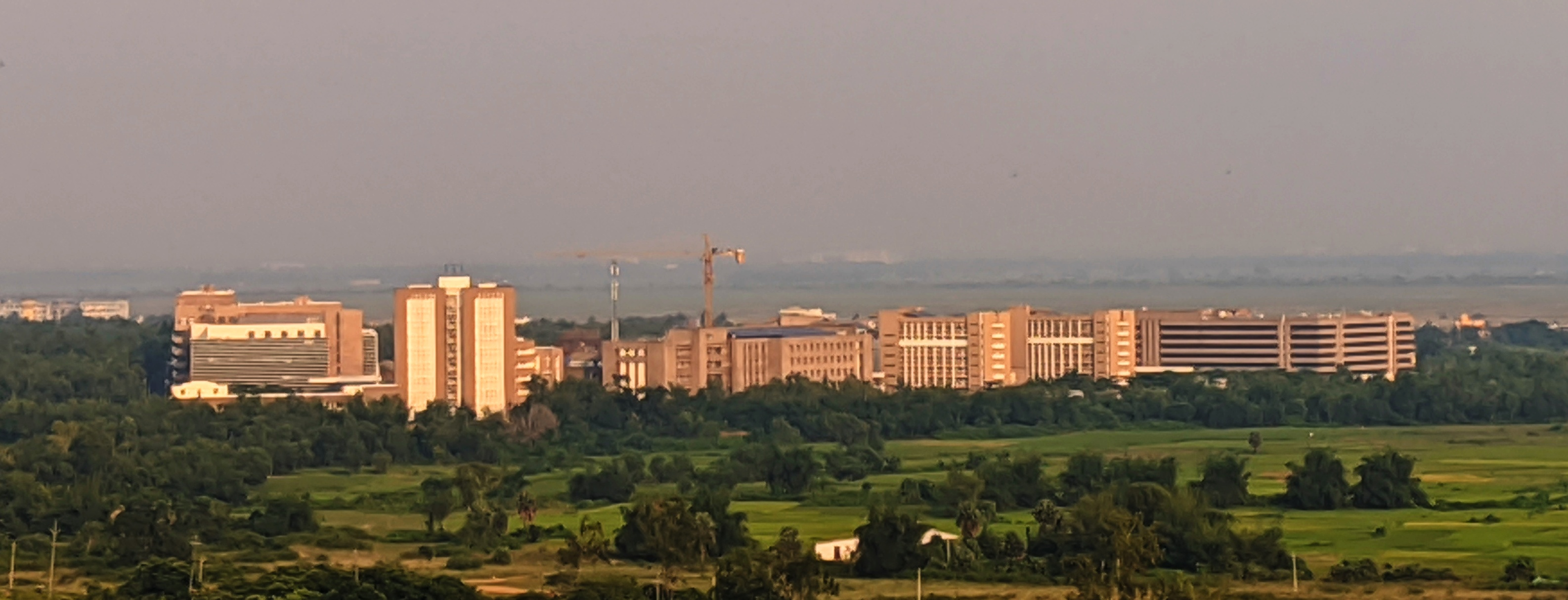
Xavier University Bhubaneswar

- Xavier Institute of Management in Bhubaneswar (since 1987)
- St. Xavier's School, Rutungia in Kandhamal (since 1995)
- St. Joseph's School in Kendrapara (since 1996)
- Loyola School in Bhubaneswar (since 2001)
- Loyola School in Baripada (since 2002)
- Xavier University in Bhubaneswar (since 2013)
- Loyola School in Kalinganagar (since 2016)

==== Puducherry ====
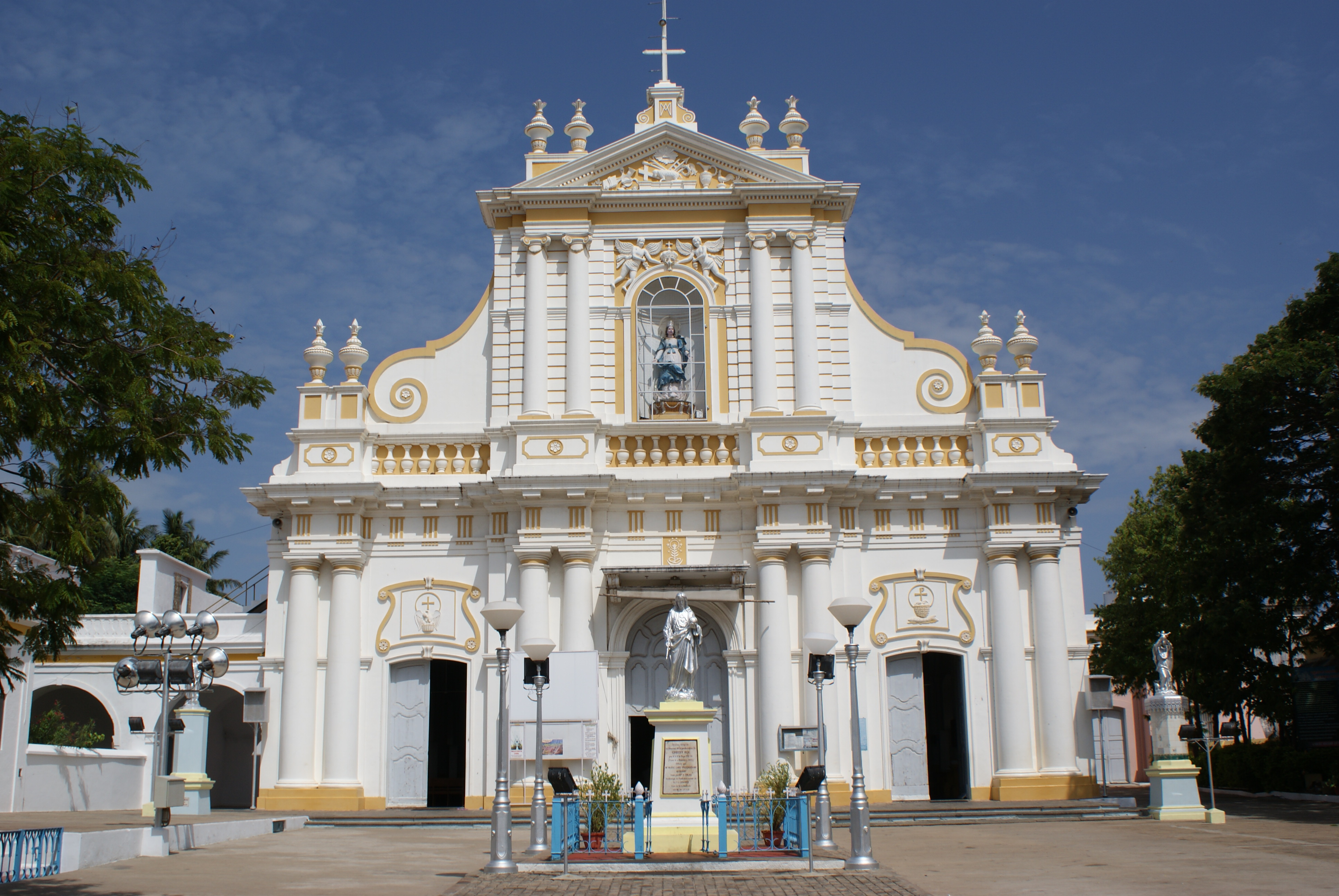
College church, Pondicherry

- Church of Our Lady of Good Health in Ariyankuppam (1690–1773)
- Jesuit college of Pondicherry (1689–1773), now the Immaculate Conception Cathedral

==== Rajasthan ====
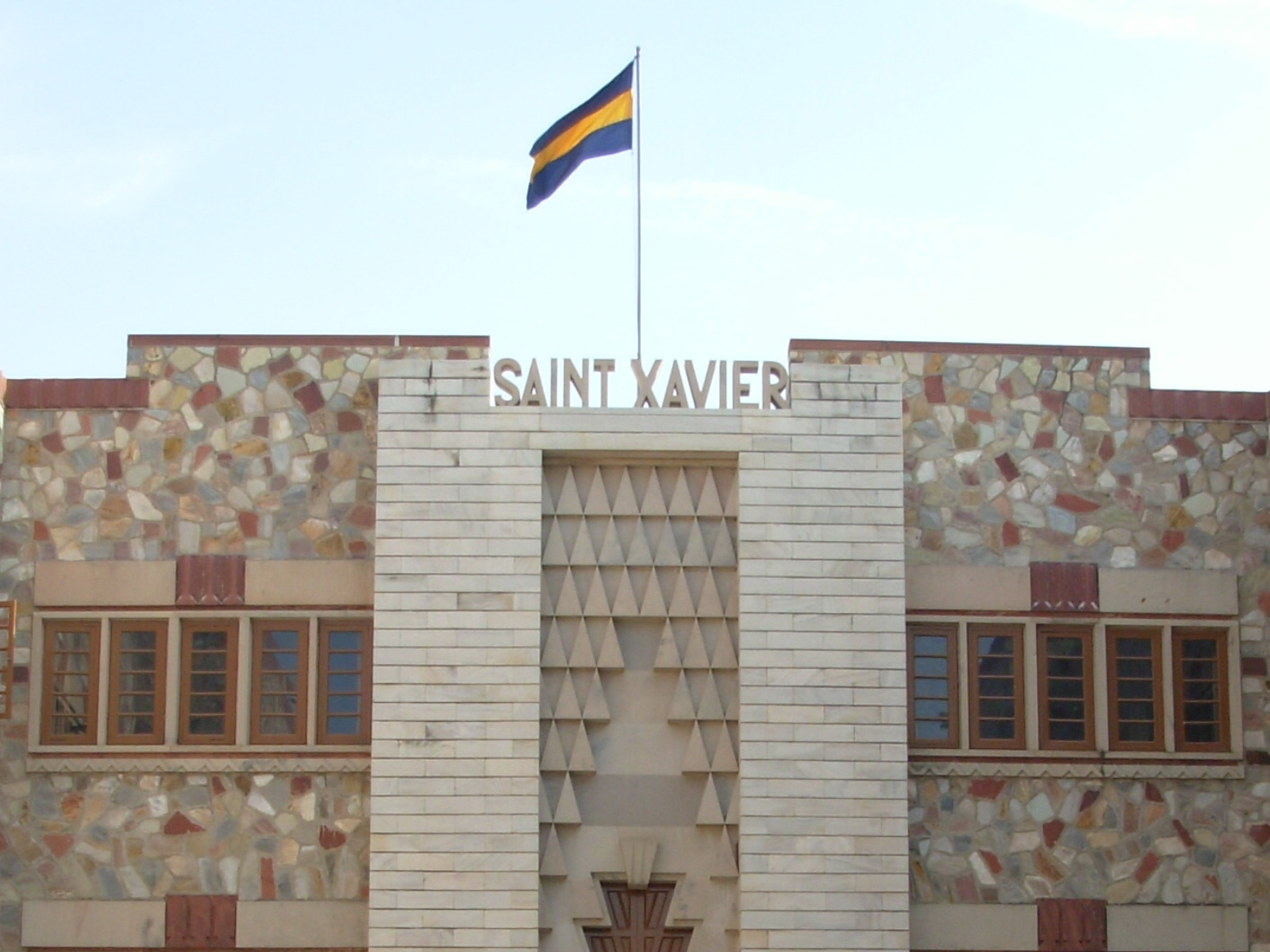
St Xavier's School, Jaipur

- St. Xavier's School in Jaipur (since 1941)
- St. Xavier's School in Behror (since 1991)
- St. Xavier's College in Jaipur (since 2010)
- St. Xavier's School, Nevta in Jaipur (since 2015)
- St. Xavier's High School in Mahua

==== Tamil Nadu ====
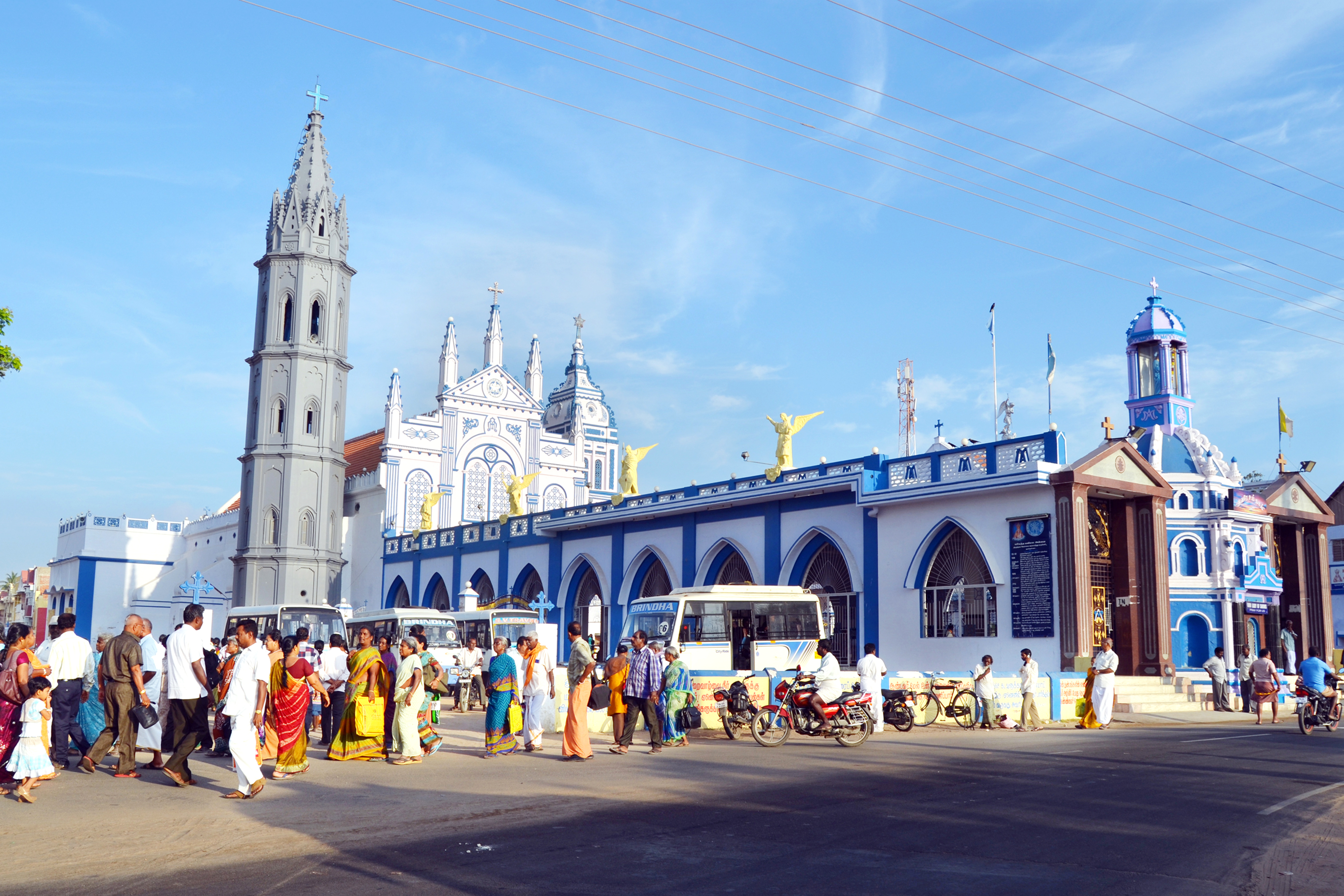
Our Lady of Snows, Thoothukudi

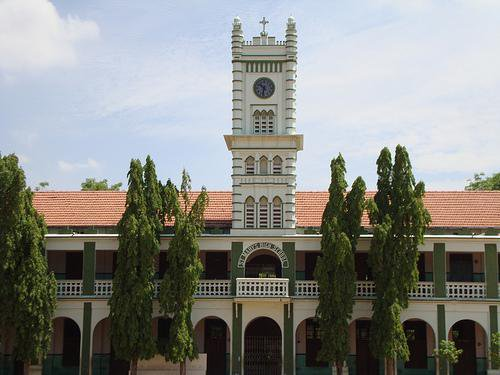
St Mary's School, Dindigul

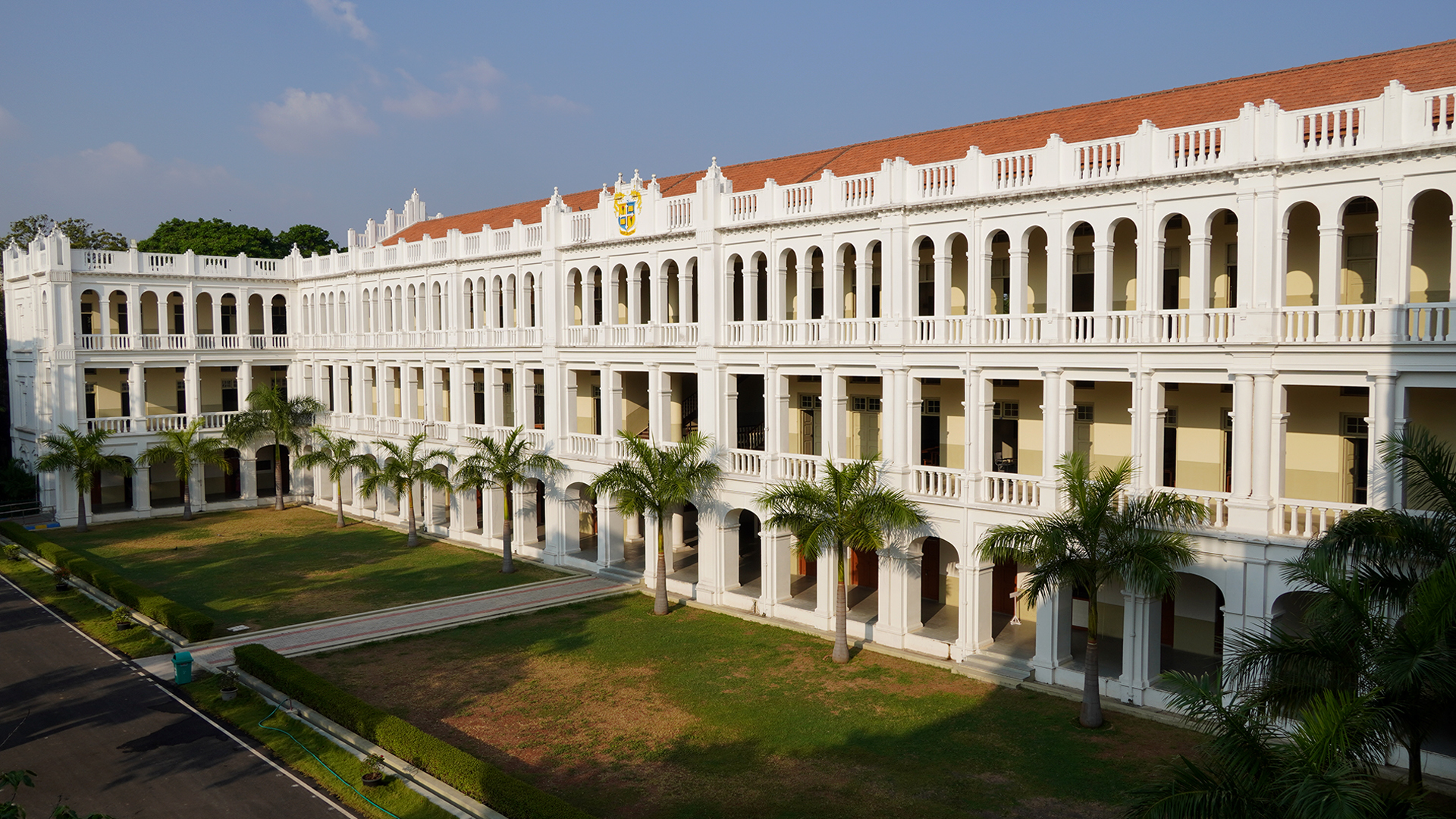
Loyola College, Chennai

- Church of Saint Francis Xavier in Punnaikayal (1544–1663)
- Basilica of Our Lady of Snows in Thoothukudi (1582–1773, with interruption from 1658 to before 1713)
- Shrine of Saint John de Britto (Arul Anandar) in Orur (since 1734)
- St. Joseph's College in Tiruchirappalli (since 1844)
- St. Mary's Higher Secondary School in Dindigul (since 1850)
- St. Joseph Boys Higher Secondary School in Tiruchirappalli (since 1862)
- St. Xavier's Higher Secondary School in Palayamkottai (since 1880)
- St. Xavier's Higher Secondary School in Thoothukudi (since 1884)
- St. Arul Anandar School in Orur (since 1908)
- St. Mary's Higher Secondary School in Madurai (since 1908)
- Carmel Higher Secondary School in Nagercoil (since 1922)
- St. Xavier's College in Palayamkottai (since 1923)
- Loyola College in Chennai (since 1925)
  - Loyola College of Education established in 2007
- Arul Anandar College, Karumathur in Madurai (since 1970)
- Loyola Institute of Business Administration in Chennai (since 1979)
- Loyola Higher Secondary School, Kuppayanallur in Kanchipuram district (since 1995)
- Loyola-ICAM College of Engineering and Technology in Chennai (since 2010)
- Loyola Academy in Maraimalai Nagar near Chennai (since 2011)

==== Telangana ====
- St. Patrick's High School in Secunderabad (since 1911)
- Loyola Academy in Secunderabad (since 1976)
- Loyola High School in Karimnagar (since 1980)
- St.Paul's High School in Hyderabad (since 1954)
- Little Flowers High School in Hyderabad (since 1953)
- St.Gabriel's High School in Kazipet (since 1955)
- All Saints High School in Hyderabad (since 1855)
- St. Alphonsus High School in Nalgonda (since 1965)

==== Uttar Pradesh ====
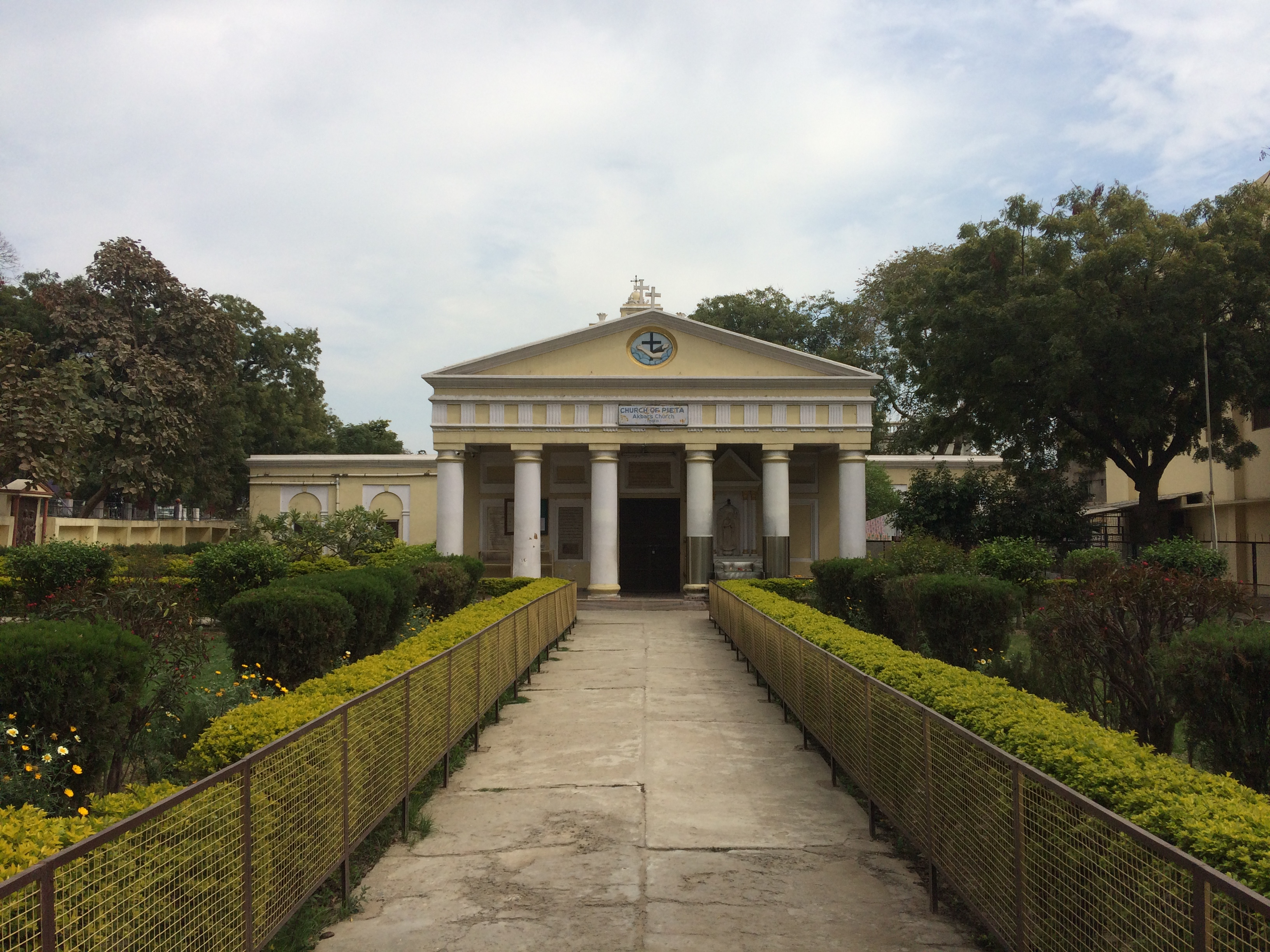
Akbar's Church, Agra

- Akbar's Church in Agra (1599–1803)

==== West Bengal ====
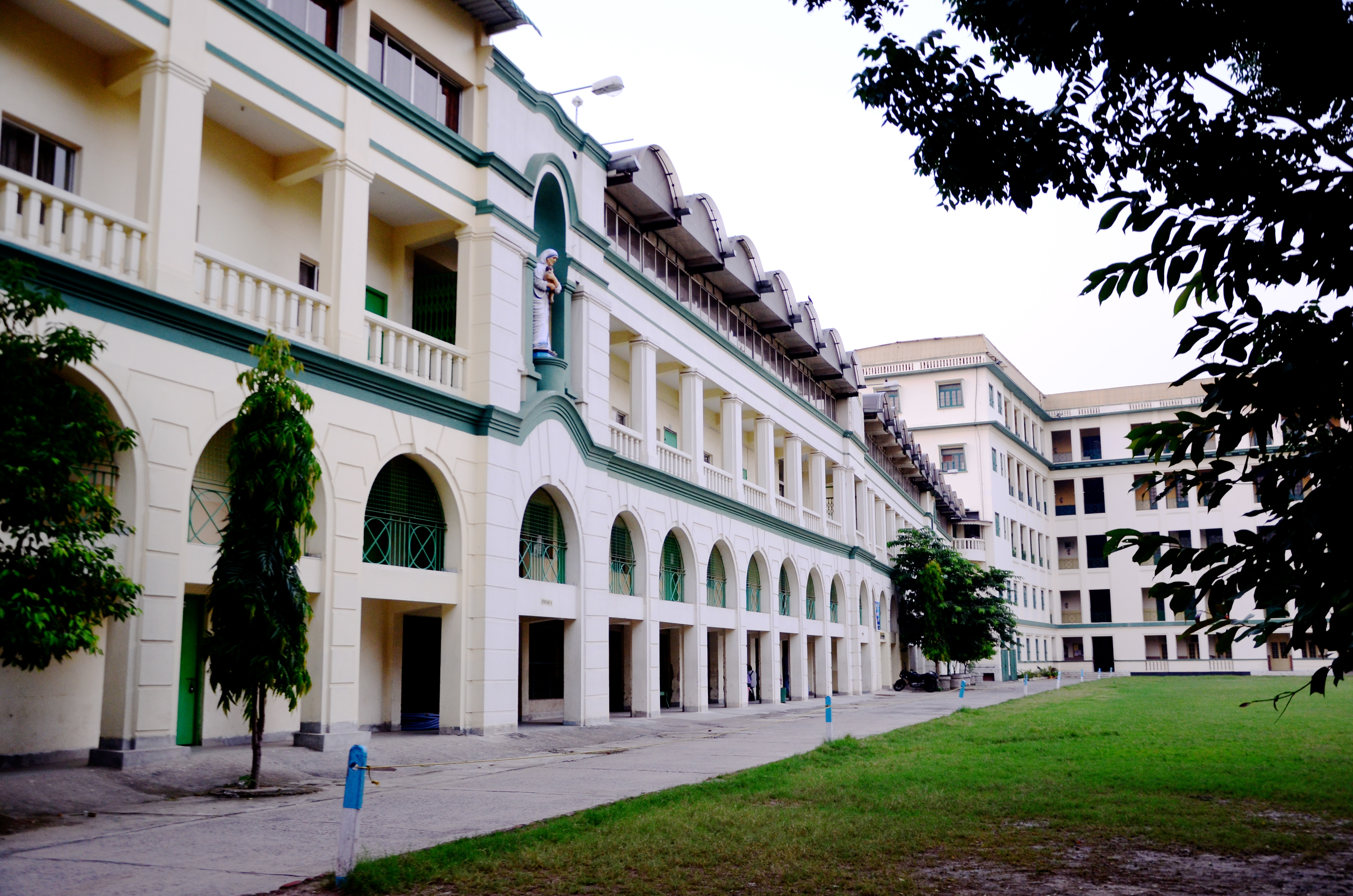
St Xavier's College, Kolkata

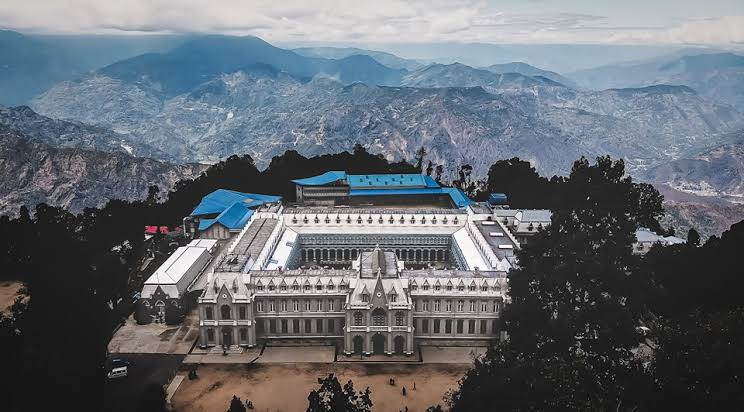
St Joseph's School, Darjeeling

- St. Xavier's College in Kolkata (since 1860)
- St. Xavier's Collegiate School in Kolkata (since 1860)
- Ecole Sainte-Marie in Chandannagar (1862–1887), now Chandernagore Government College
- St. James' School in Kolkata (since 1864)
- Saint Joseph's Seminary (1879–1971), initially in Asansol and after 1889 in Kurseong; moved to Delhi in 1972
- St. Joseph's School in Darjeeling (since 1888)
- St. Joseph's College in Darjeeling (since 1927)
- St. Lawrence High School in Kolkata (since 1937)
- Loyola High School in Kolkata (since 1961)
- St. Xavier's School in Durgapur (since 1963)
- St. Xavier's School in Bardhaman (since 1964)
- Church of the Lord Jesus in Kolkata (since 1969)
- St. Xavier's School in Raiganj (since 1999)
- North Bengal St. Xavier's College in Jalpaiguri (since 2007)
- St. Xavier's College in Bardhaman (since 2014)
- St. Xavier's College in Asansol (since 2015)
- St. Xavier's University in Kolkata (since 2017)
- St. Xavier's School, Haldia in Howrah (since 2019)

=== Nepal ===
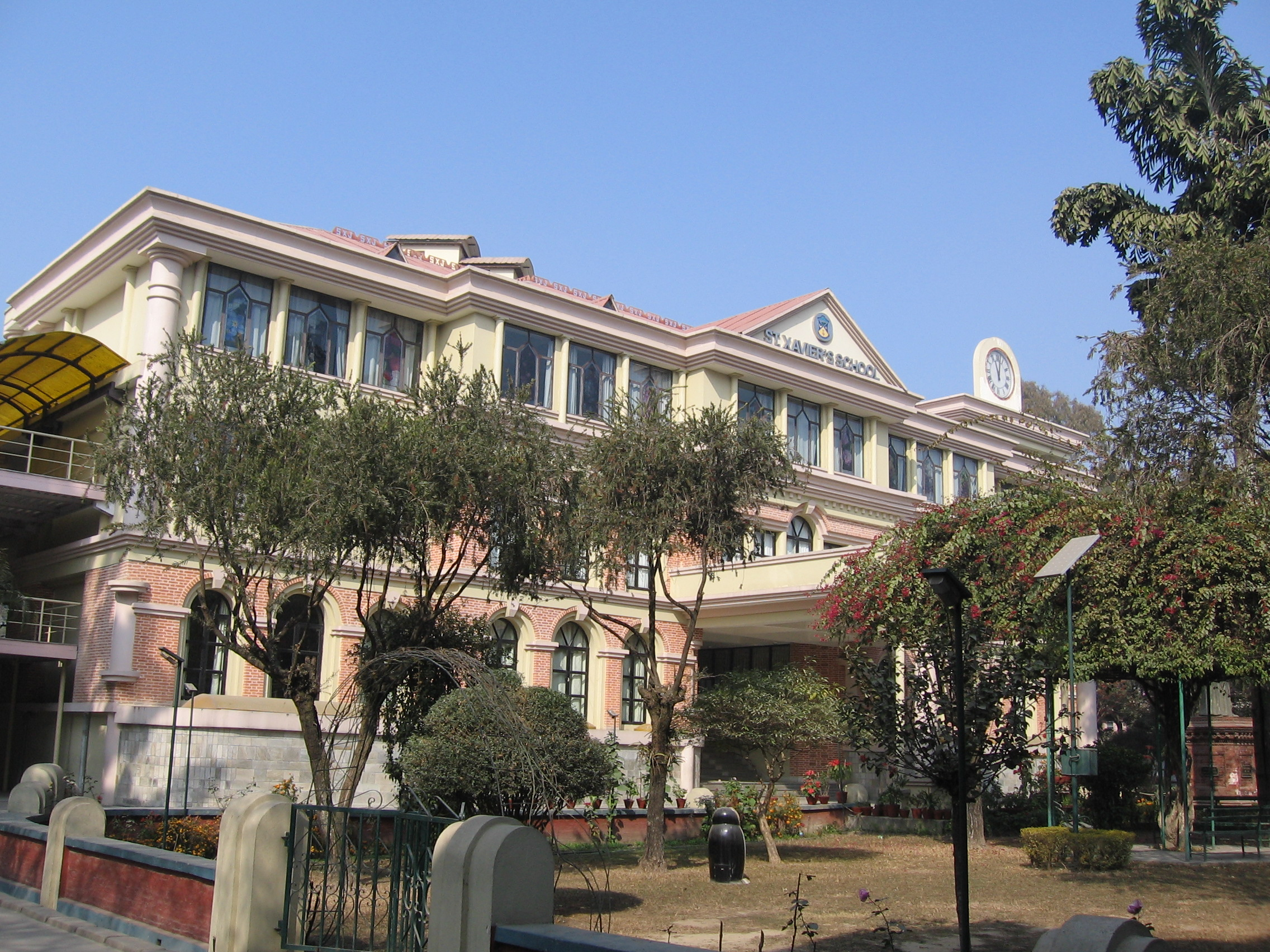
St Xavier's School, Jawalakhel

- St. Xavier's School in Jawalakhel near Lalitpur (since 1951)
- St. Xavier's School in Godawari, Lalitpur (since 1951)
- St. Xavier's College, Maitighar in Kathmandu (since 1988)

=== Pakistan ===
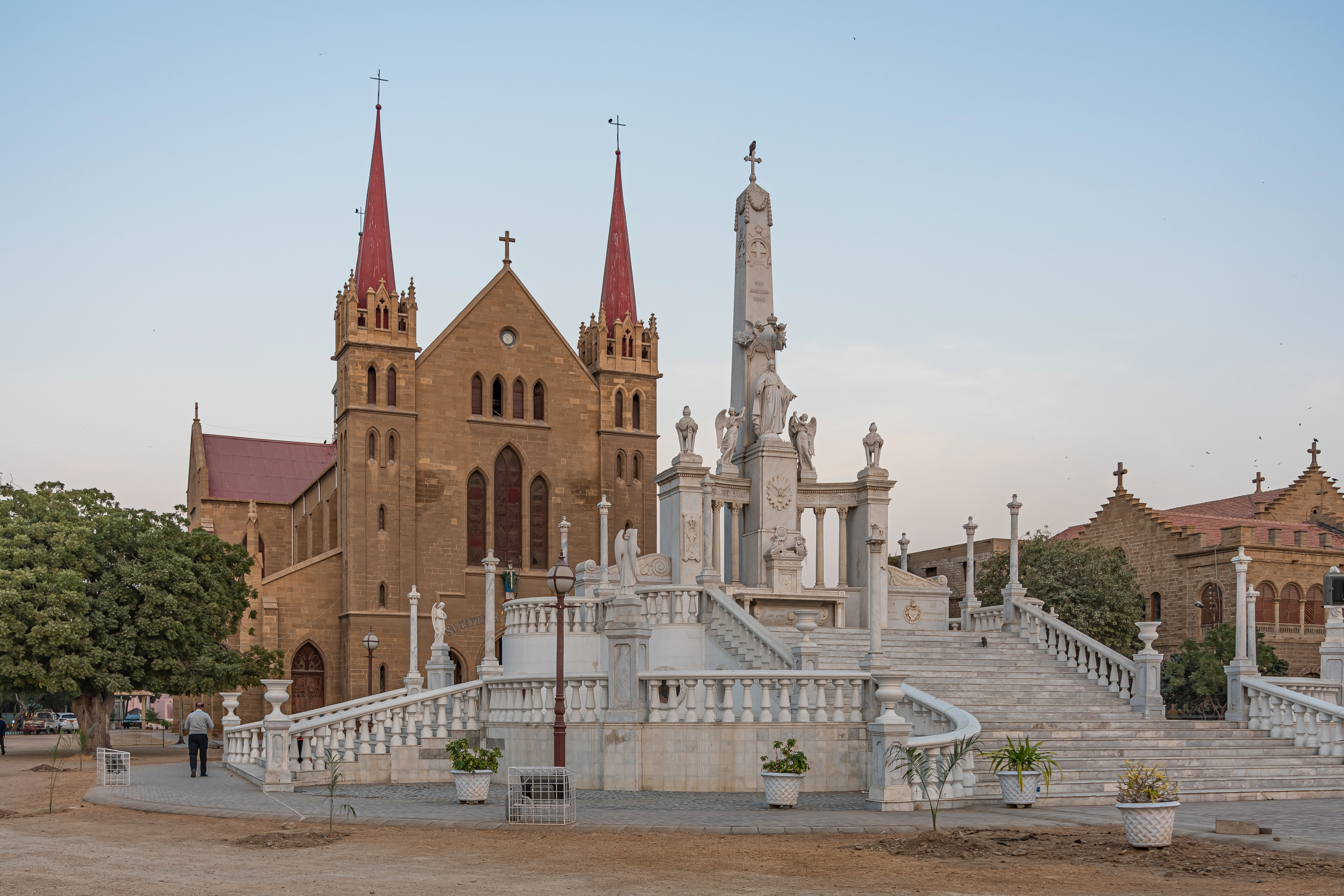
St Patrick's Cathedral, Karachi

- St. Patrick's High School in Karachi (1861–1950)
- Saint Patrick's Cathedral in Karachi (1881–1935), and the Monument to Christ the King built 1927
- St. Francis Xavier Seminary near Lahore (since 1990)

=== Sri Lanka ===
St Aloysius' College, Galle

- St. Xavier's College in Nuwara Eliya (since 1859)
- St. Mary's Cathedral in Galle (1874–1963)
- Jnana Deepa, Institute of Philosophy and Theology in Kandy (1893–1955)
- St. Aloysius' College in Galle (1895–1971)
- St. Servatius' College in Matara (1897–1965)
- St Joseph's College in Trincomalee (since 1901)
- St. Xavier's College in Marawila, Puttalam District (since 1942)
- St. Xavier's Boys' College and St. Xavier's Girls' College in Mannar

== East and Southeast Asia ==
=== China ===
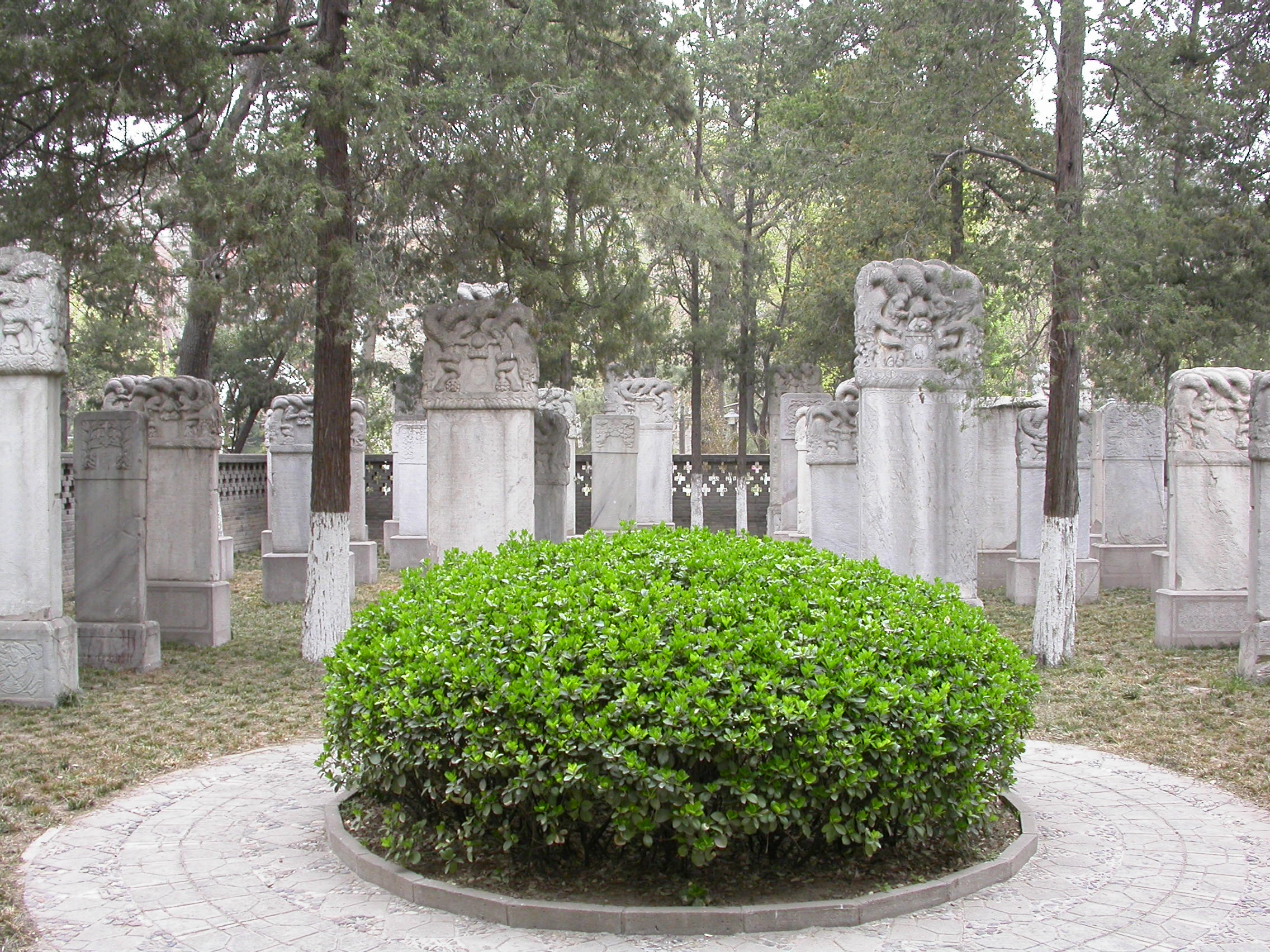
Zhalan Cemetery, Beijing

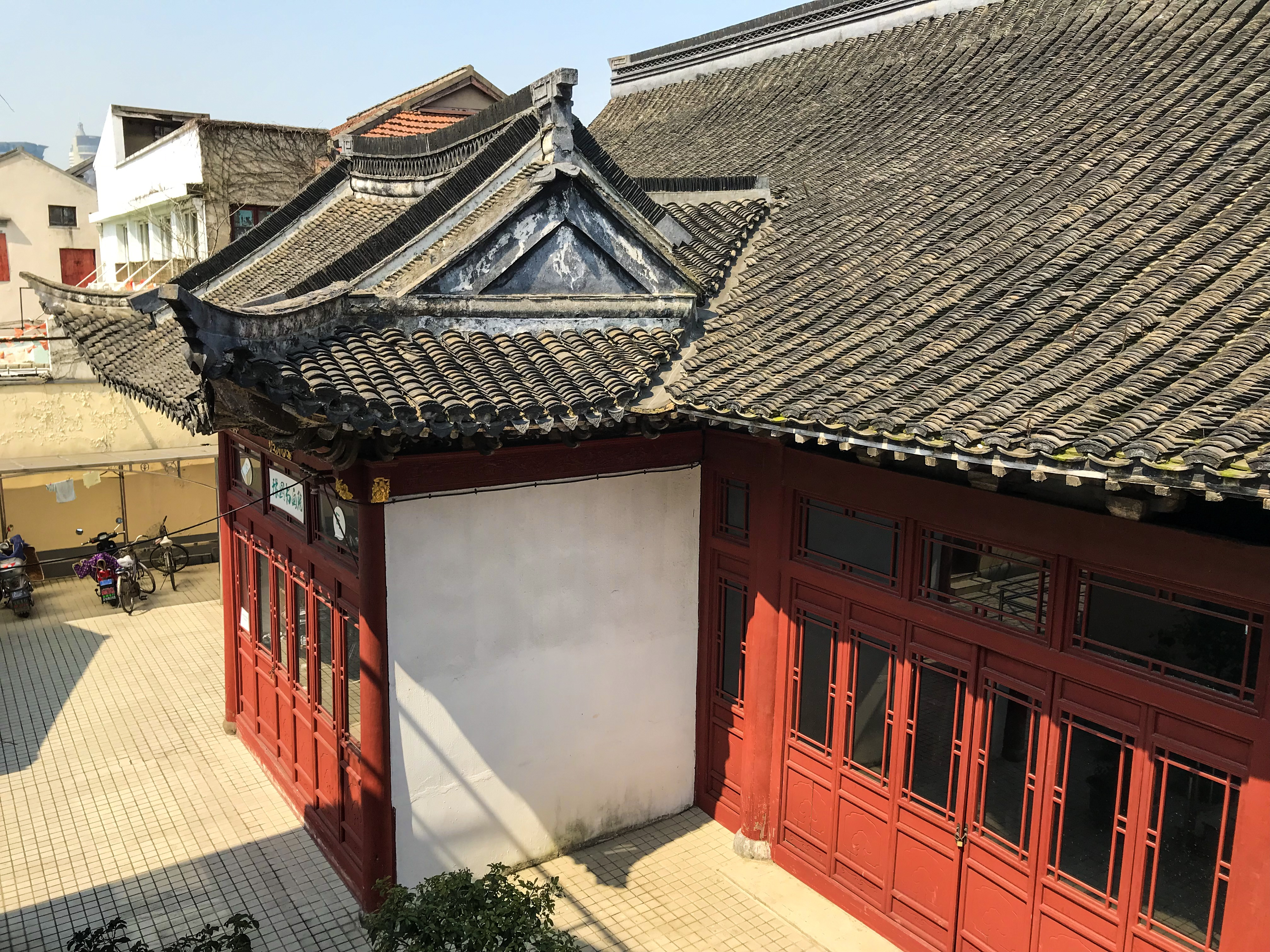
Jingyi church, Shanghai

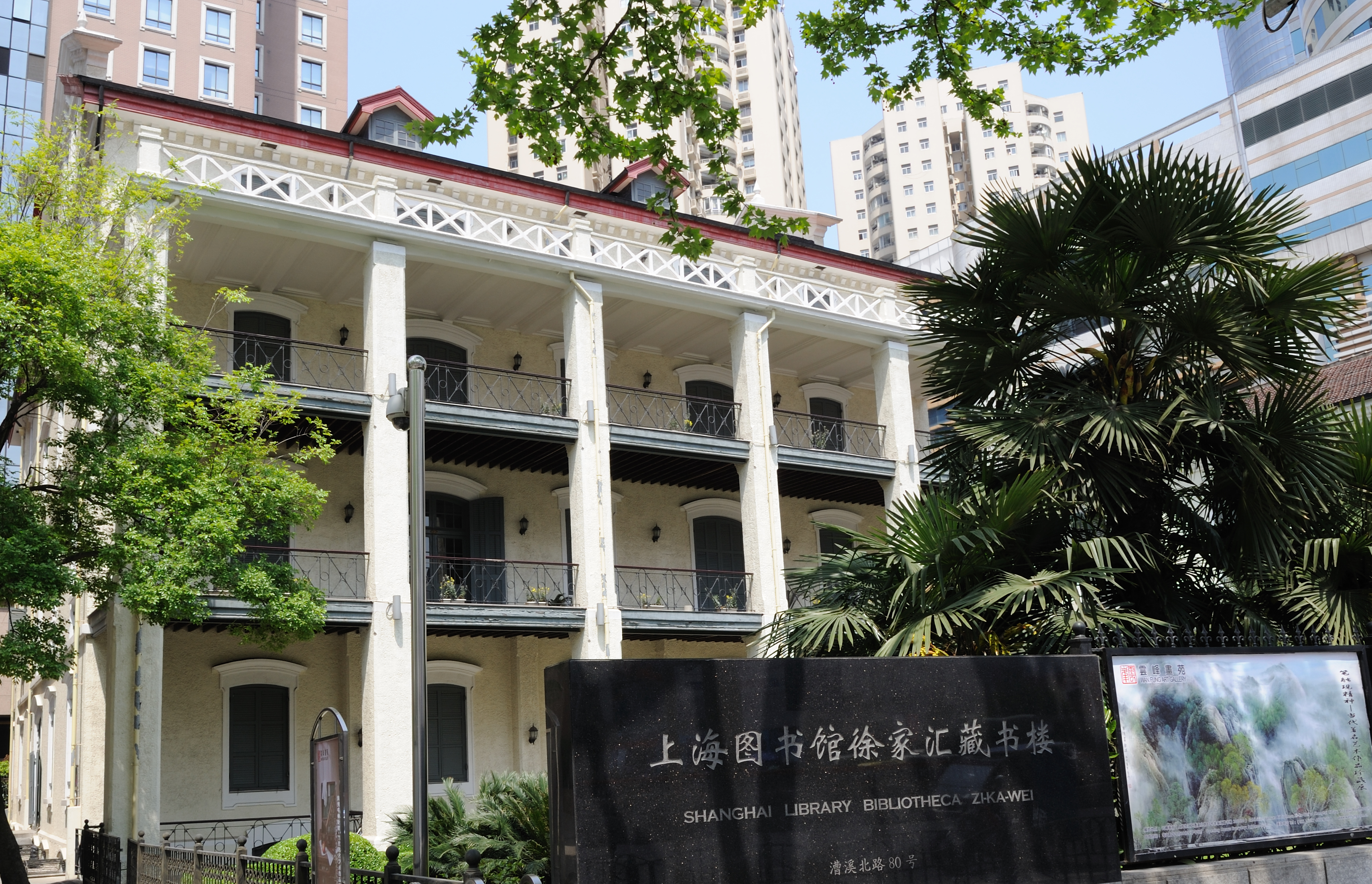
Zi-Ka-Wei Library, Shanghai

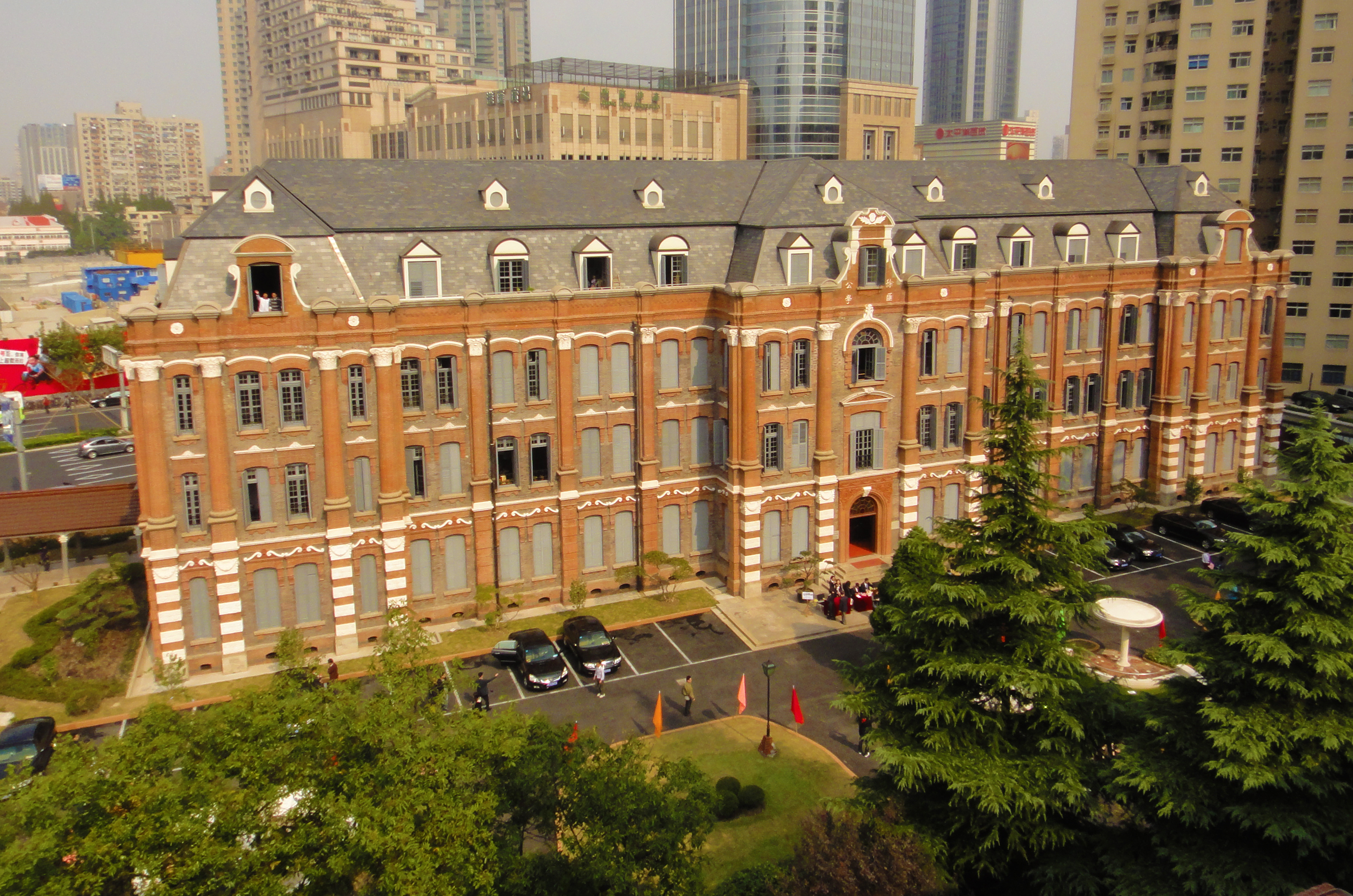
Xuhui High School, Shanghai

- Shangchuan Island (上川岛, "Saint John") in Guangdong, the place of death of Francis Xavier on 3 December 1552
- Jesuit church in Nanjing (1599–1618), rebuilt in 1870 as the Cathedral of the Immaculate Conception
- Xuanwumen (宣武门礼拜堂) or Nantang (南堂) Church in Beijing (1601–1690), now the Cathedral of the Immaculate Conception
- Zhalan Cemetery (栅栏墓地) in Beijing (1611–1773)
- Jesuit establishment in Tsaparang, Tibet (1624–28)
- Cathedral of the Immaculate Conception in Hangzhou (1627–1730, with interruption 1691–1692)
- Jingyi Church in Shanghai (1640–1731, with interruption 1665–1671)
- Guangqi Park in Xujiahui, Shanghai, final resting place of Xu Guangqi (since 1641)
- Beijing Ancient Observatory in Beijing (1644–1773)
- Wangfujing (王府井天主堂) or Dongtang (東堂) Church in Beijing (1653–1773), now St. Joseph's Church
- Xishiku (西什库天主堂) or Beitang (北堂) Church in Beijing (1694–1773), now Church of the Saviour
- St. Francis Xavier Church also known as Dongjiadu Cathedral (董家渡天主堂) in Shanghai (1847–1966)
- Bibliotheca Zi-Ka-Wei in Xujiahui, Shanghai (1847–1956)
- Xuhui High School in Xujiahui, Shanghai (1850–1949)
- St. Ignatius Cathedral in Xujiahui, Shanghai (1851–1966 and since 1978)
- Cathedral of Our Lady in Suzhou (19th century–1958)
- Xujiahui Observatory in Shanghai (1872–1945), now Shanghai Meteorological Bureau
- St. Joseph Cathedral in Wuhu (1883–1966)
- Aurora University in Shanghai (1903–1952)
- St. Francis Xavier's College in Shanghai (1874–1893)
- Church of the Good Shepherd in Shanghai (1933–1953)
- The Beijing Center for Chinese Studies at the University of International Business and Economics in Beijing (since 1998)

==== Hong Kong ====
- Ricci Hall at the University of Hong Kong (since 1929)
- Wah Yan College, Hong Kong and Wah Yan College, Kowloon (since 1932, with interruption 1941–1945)
- St. Francis Xavier's School, Tsuen Wan (since 1963)

==== Macau ====
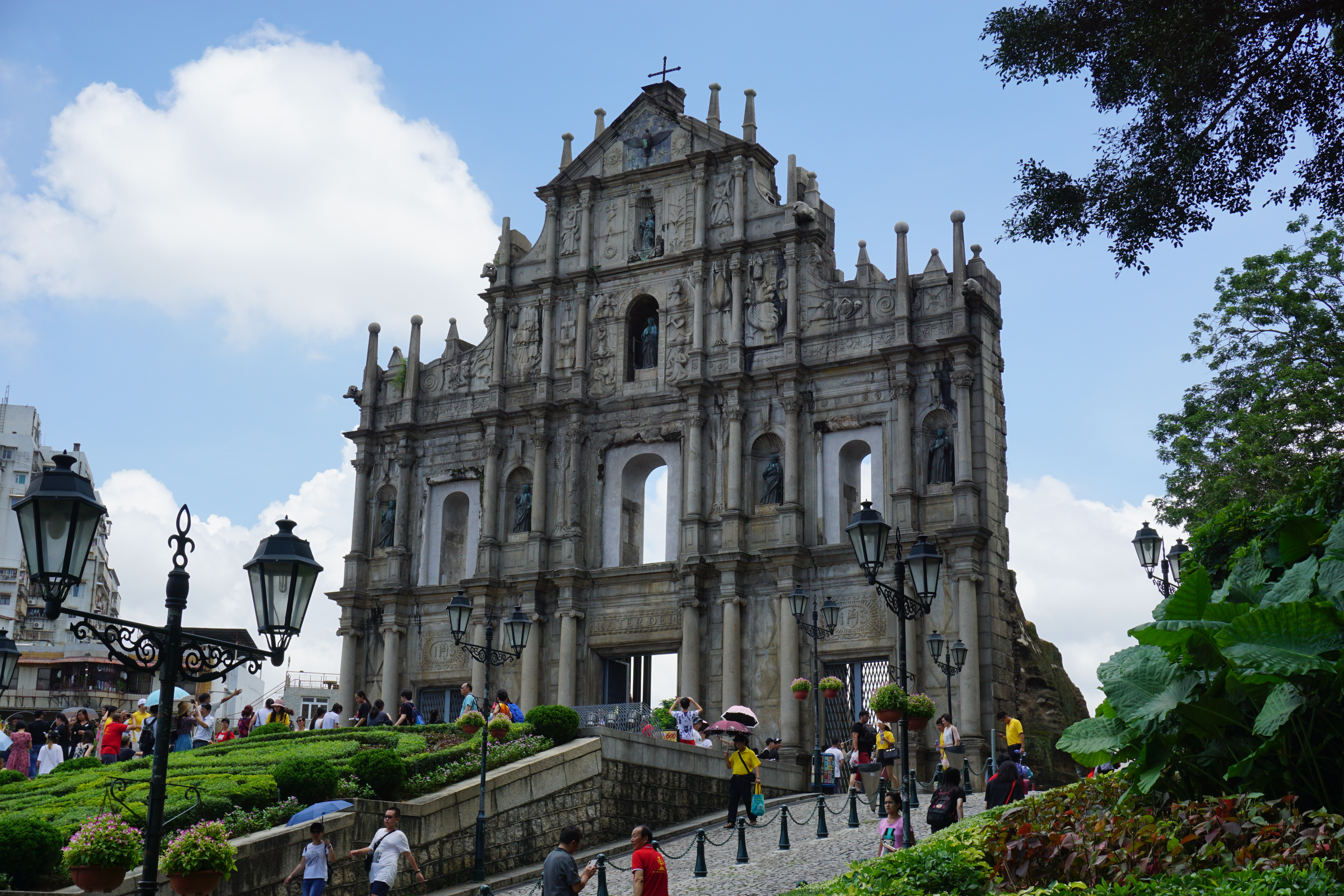
Ruins of St. Paul's, Macau

- Church of Saint Lawrence in Macau (1558–1762)
- St. Paul's College (1594–1762), now the Ruins of Saint Paul's, burial place of Alessandro Valignano
- Fortaleza do Monte (1616–1626)
- St. Joseph's Seminary and Church (1728–1762)
- Ricci Institute (since 1999)

=== Indonesia ===
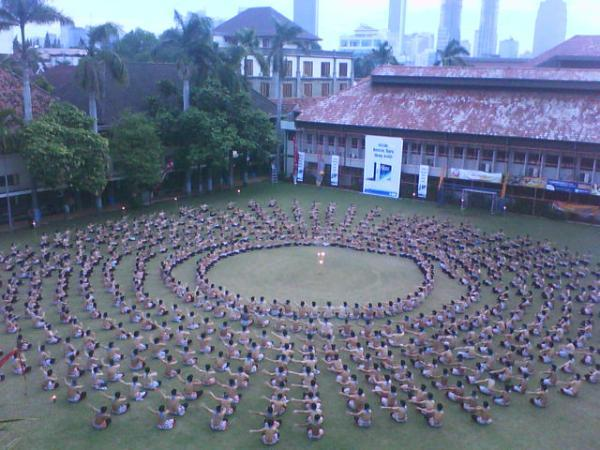
Canisius College, Jakarta

- Jesuit mission on Ambon Island (1578–1605) and Ternate
- Peter Canisius Minor Seminary Mertoyudan in Yogyakarta, Java (since 1912)
- Canisius College in Jakarta, Java (since 1927)
- De Britto High School in Yogyakarta, Java (since 1948)
- Kolese Loyola in Semarang, Central Java (since 1949)
- PIKA Industrial Woodworking School in Semarang, Central Java (since 1953)
- Sanata Dharma University, Yogyakarta, Java (since 1955), and Mechatronics Polytechnic of Sanata Dharma since 2011
- St. Michael Technical School in Surakarta, Central Java (since 1962)
- KPTT Agricultural Training Center in Salatiga (since 1965)
- Polytechnic ATMI Surakarta, Central Java (since 1968)
- Kolese Gonzaga in Jakarta, Java (since 1987), and Wacana Bhakti Seminary on the same campus since 1988
- College Le Cocq d'Armandville in Nabire, Papua (since 1987)

=== Japan ===
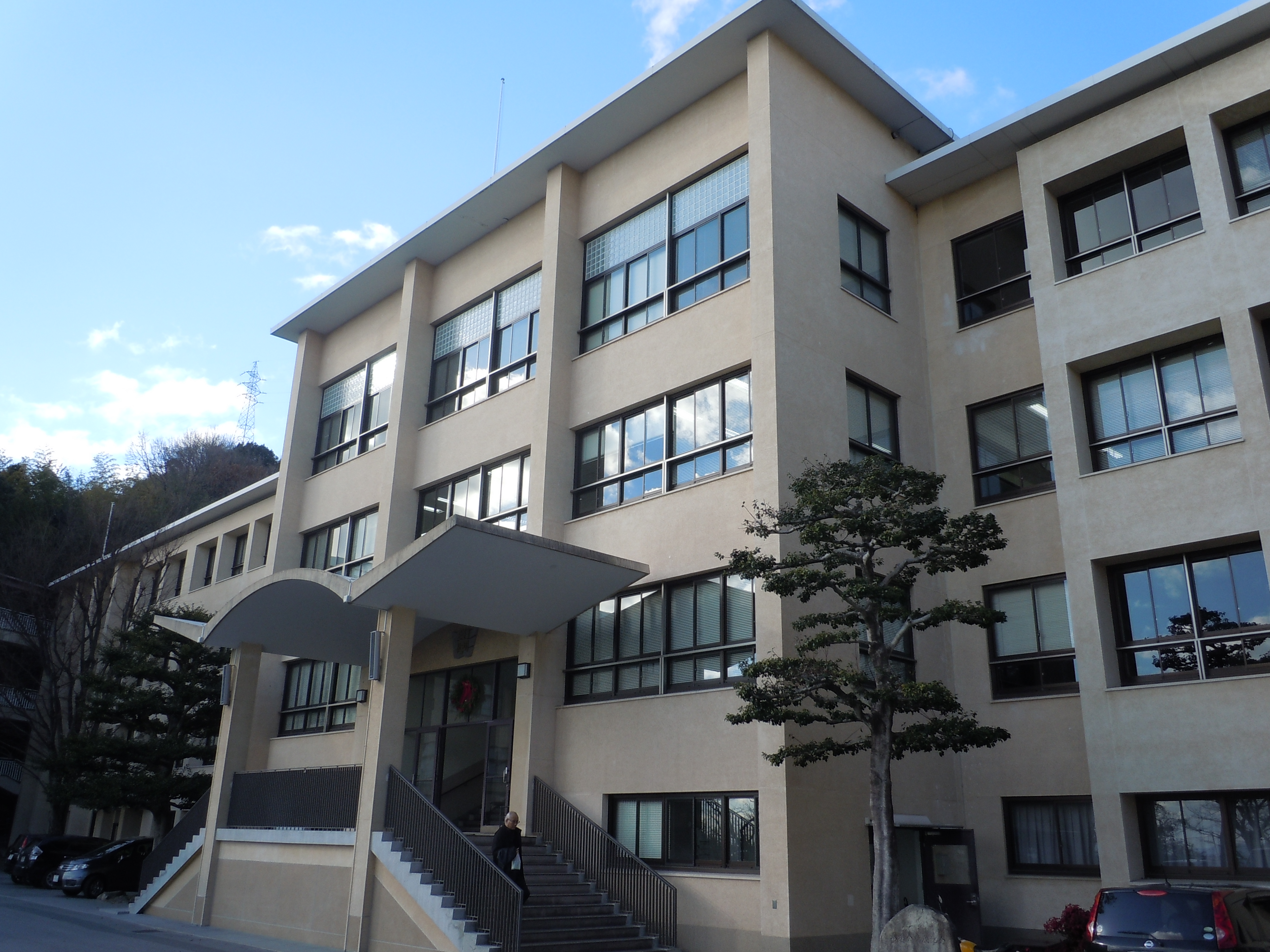
Hiroshima Academy High School

- Jesuit outpost in Yokoseura, Kyushu (1562–1563)
- Nanbanji Church in Kyoto (1576–1587)
- Dejima Island in Nagasaki, Kyushu (1580–1588)
- Jesuit art school (Seminario dei Pittori) in Kumamoto and other locations (c.1590–1614)
- Sophia University in Tokyo (since 1913), including the Church of Saint Ignatius
- Rokko Junior and Senior High School in Kobe (since 1937)
- Elisabeth University of Music in Hiroshima (since 1947)
- Eiko Gakuen in Kamakura (since 1947)
- Hiroshima Academy Junior and Senior High School in Hiroshima (since 1956)
- Sophia Fukuoka Junior and Senior High School in Fukuoka (since 1983)

=== Malaysia ===
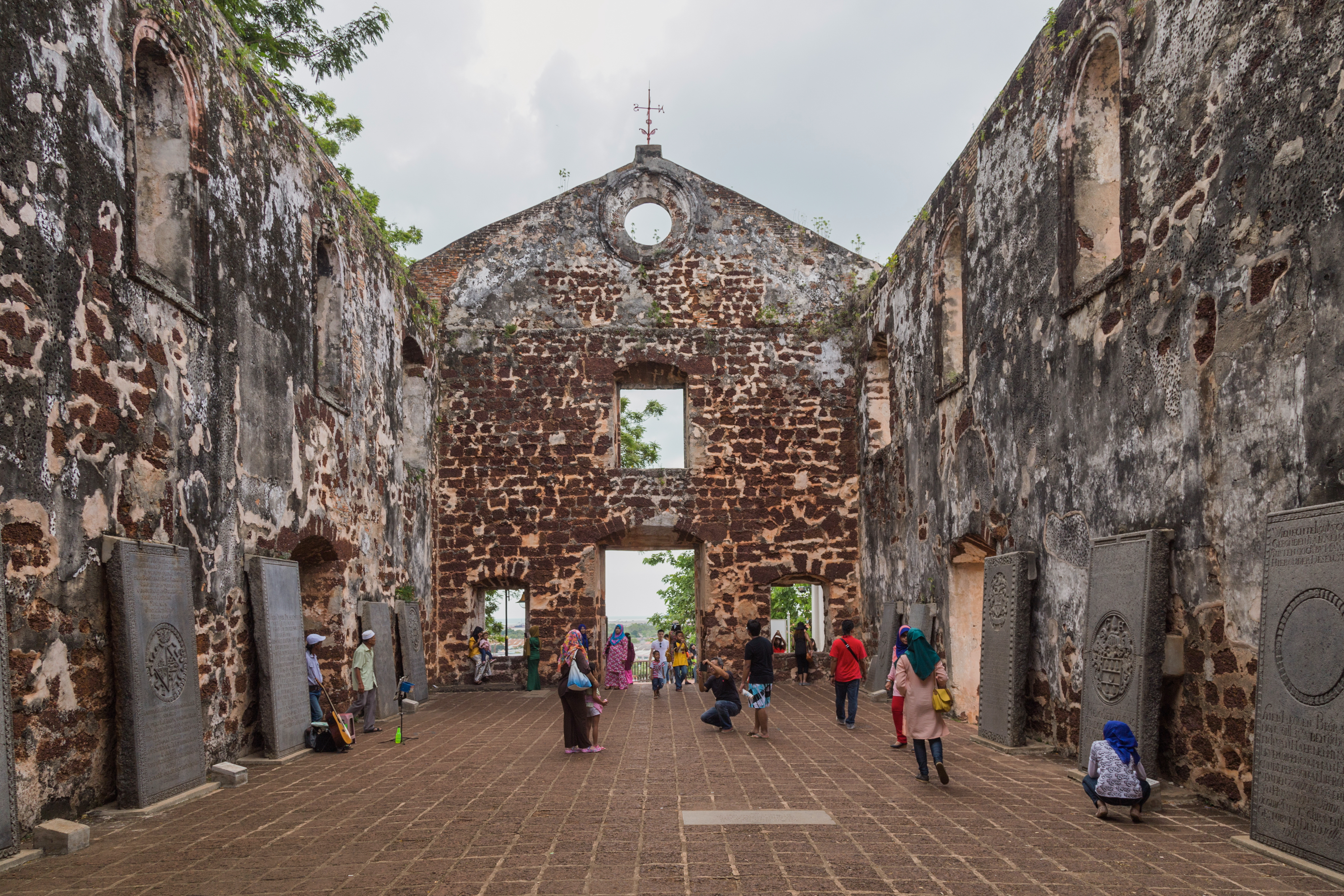
Church of St Paul, Malacca

- Church of Saint Paul in Malacca City (1548–1641)
- St. Francis Xavier's Church in Petaling Jaya near Kuala Lumpur (since 1957)

=== Philippines ===
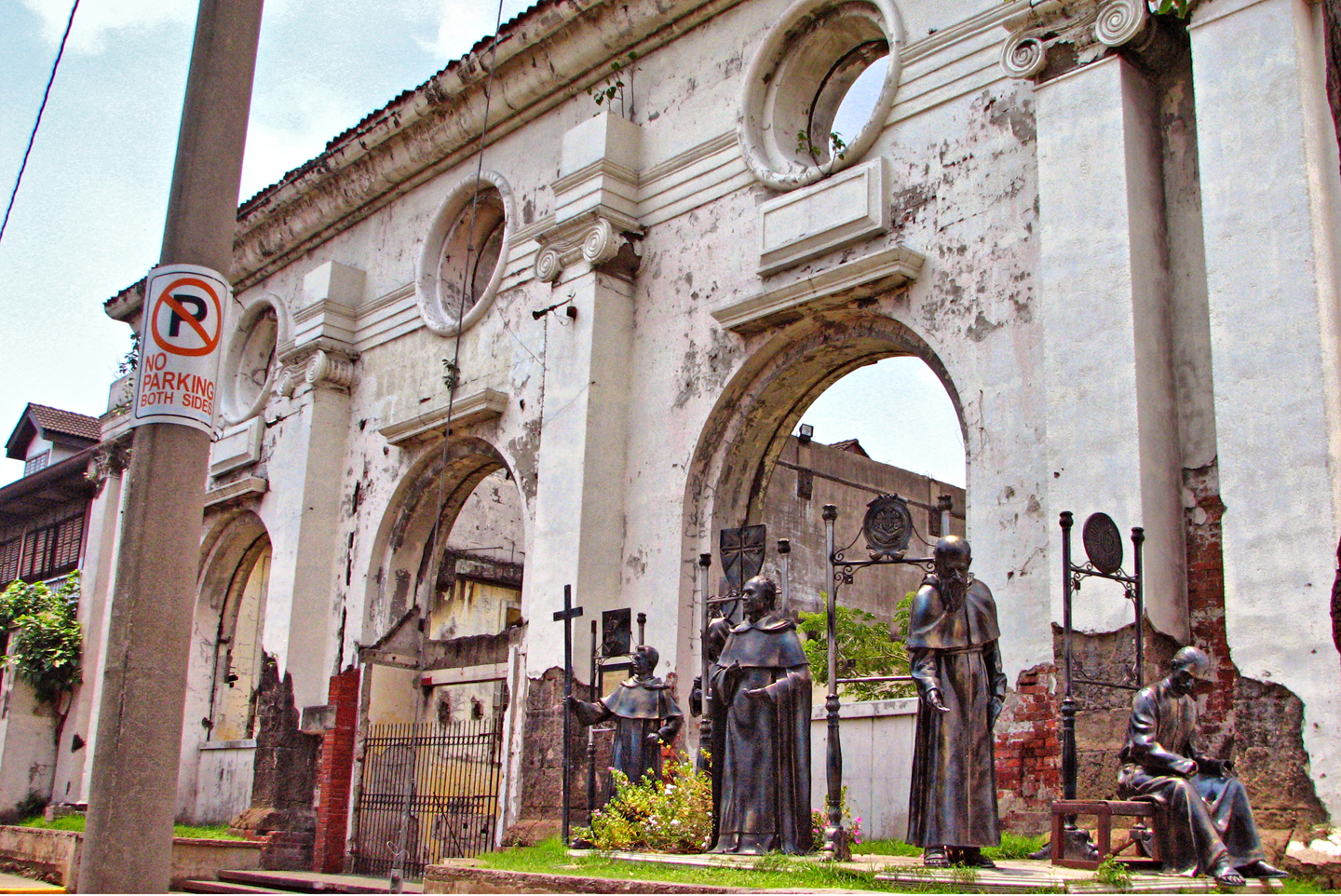
College church, Manila

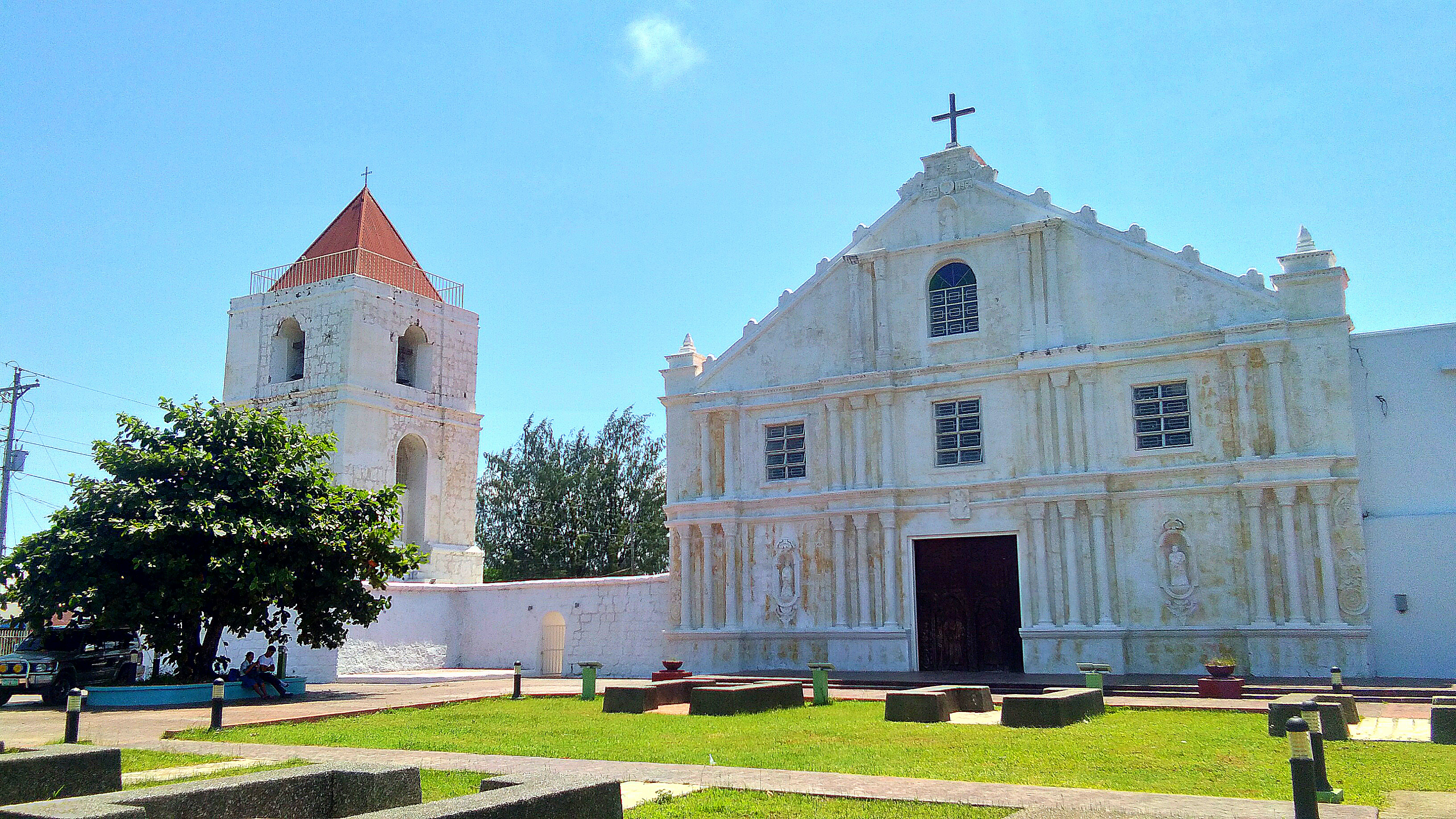
Guiuan Church

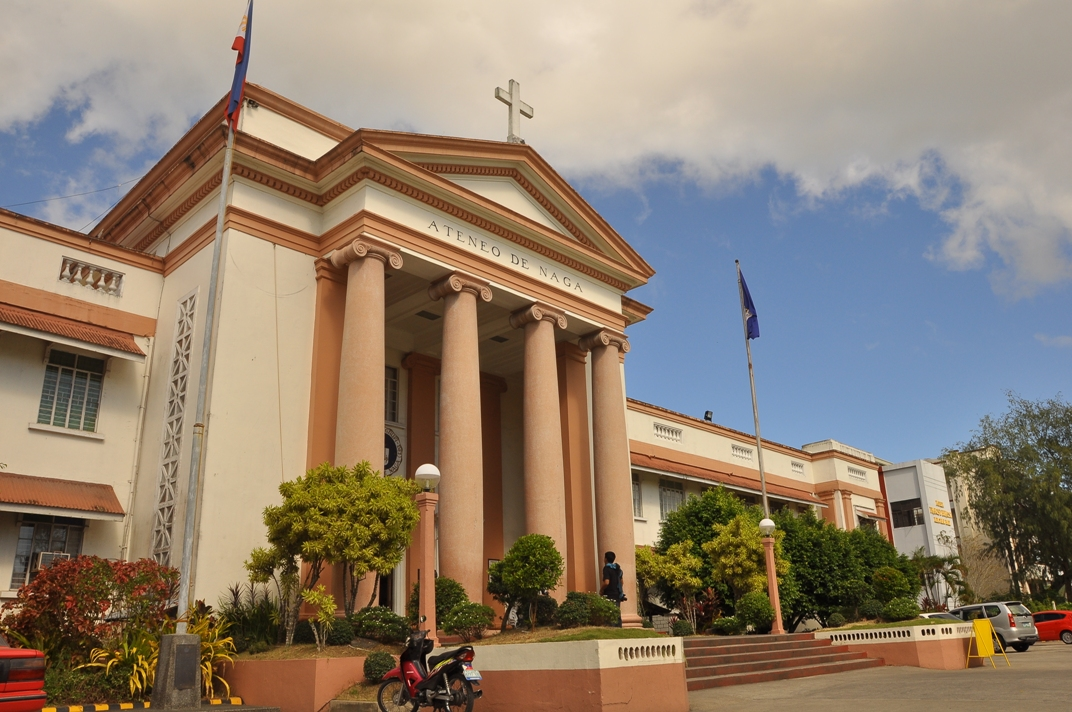
Ateneo de Naga

Christ the King Church in the Ateneo de Naga University campus, Naga City, Philippines

- Jesuit college of Manila (1587–1767), from 1621 Universidad de San Ignacio, destroyed (including the San Ignacio Church) during the Battle of Manila (1945); partly reconstructed from 2009 and reopened in 2018 as the Museo de Intramuros
- Colegio de San Ildefonso in Cebu City (1595–1767)
- Guiuan Church in Guiuan, Eastern Samar (1595–1768)
- Santa Cruz Church in Manila (1619–1773)
- Ateneo de Manila University in Quezon City (since 1859), founded as Escuela Municipal de Manila, with Church of the Gesù built 2001–2002
- Manila Observatory in Manila (since 1865)
- Immaculate Conception Parish Church in Jasaan, Misamis Oriental (since 1887)
- Ateneo de Zamboanga University in Zamboanga City (since 1912)
- Xavier University – Ateneo de Cagayan in Cagayan de Oro, Misamis Oriental (since 1933)
- Loyola College of Culion, Palawan, originally Culion Catholic Primary School (since 1936)
- Ateneo de Naga University, Naga, Camarines Sur (since 1940)
- Ateneo de San Pablo in San Pablo City (1947–1978)
- Ateneo de Davao University, Davao City (since 1948)
- Ateneo de Tuguegarao in Tuguegarao, Cagayan (1949–1962)
- Sacred Heart School – Ateneo de Cebu in Mandaue (since 1955)
- Xavier School in San Juan City (since 1956)
- Ateneo de Iloilo in Iloilo City (since 2004)
- Xavier School in Nuvali, Calamba, Laguna (since 2012)

=== Republic of Korea ===
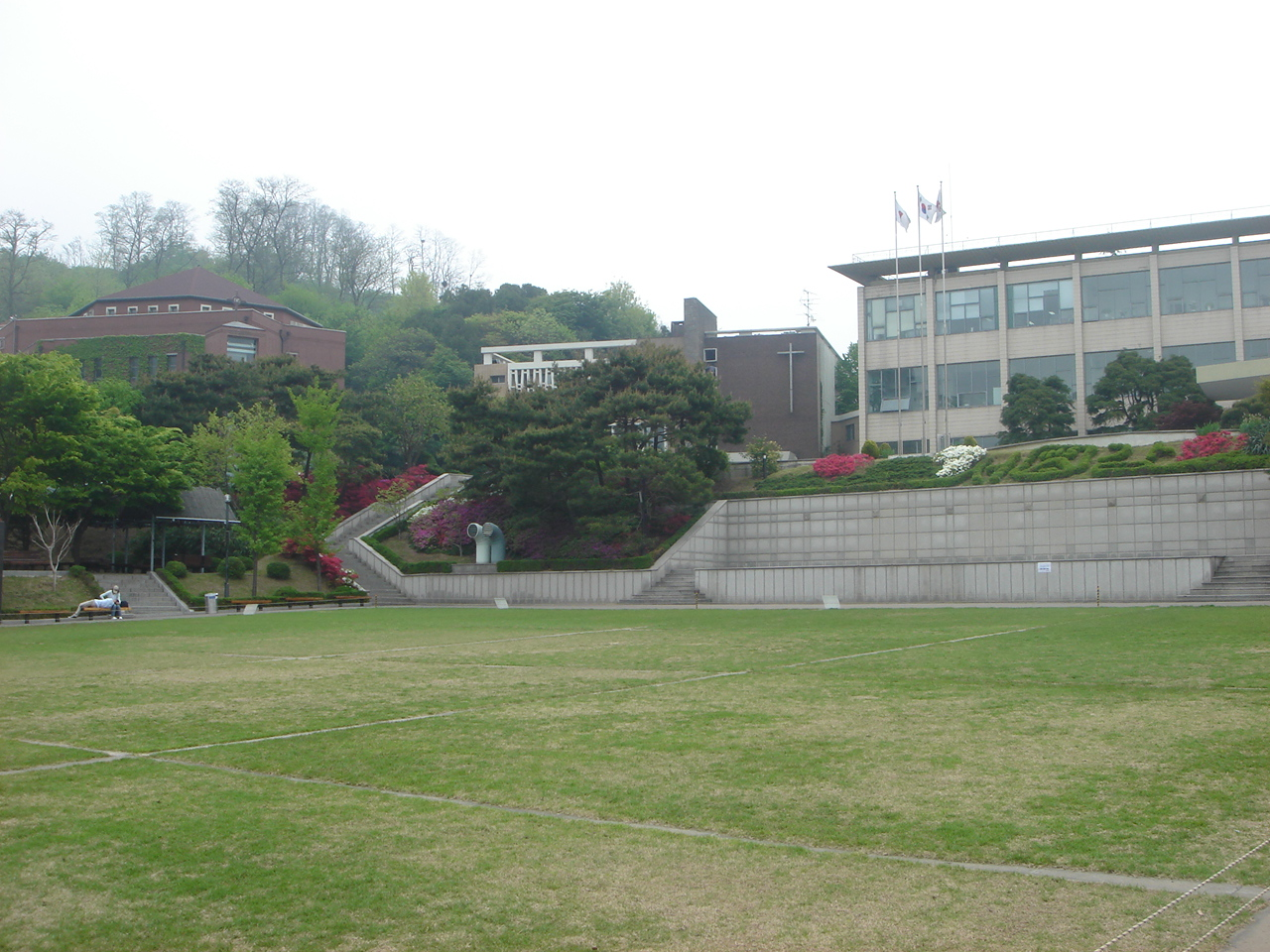
Sogang University, Seoul

- Sogang University in Seoul (since 1960)

=== Taiwan ===
- Fu Jen Catholic University in New Taipei City (since 1961)
- Church of the Holy Family near Daan Forest Park in Taipei (since 1964)
- Taipei Ricci Institute in Taipei (since 1966)
- Rerum Novarum Centre in Taipei (since 1971)

=== Thailand ===
- Jesuit mission in Ayutthaya (1670–1767)
- Jesuit observatory in Lopburi (1685–1687)

=== Timor-Leste ===
- St Joseph's High School in Dili (since 1993)
- St. Ignatius of Loyola College in Dili (since 2013)
- St. John de Britto Institute in Dili (since 2016)

=== Vietnam ===
- Pontifical Seminary of the Immaculate Heart of the Blessed Virgin Mary at Dalat University in Da Lat (1958–1977)
- Alexandre de Rhodes Center in Ho Chi Minh City (1959–1980)

== Oceania ==
=== Australia ===
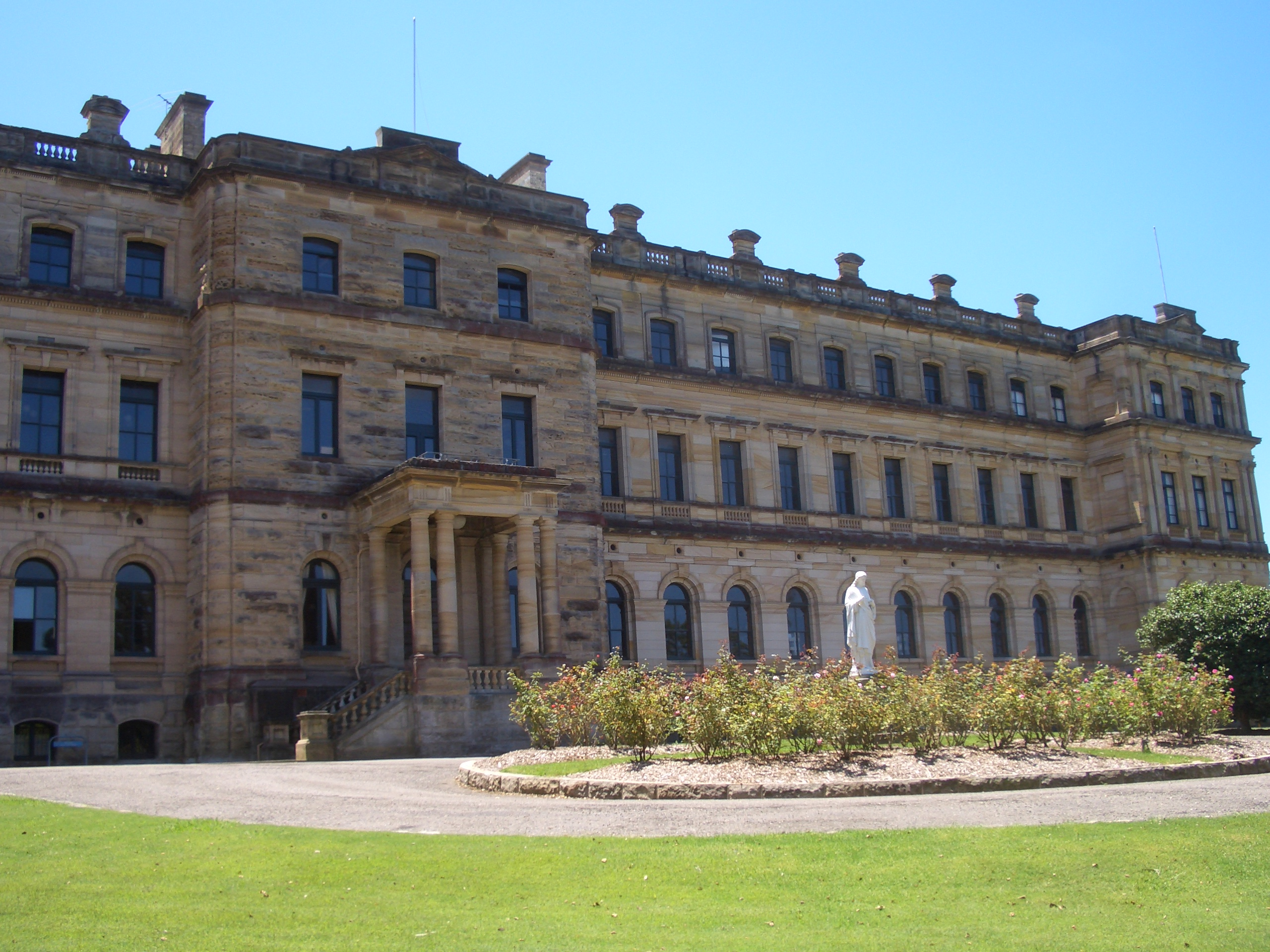
St Ignatius' College, Riverview

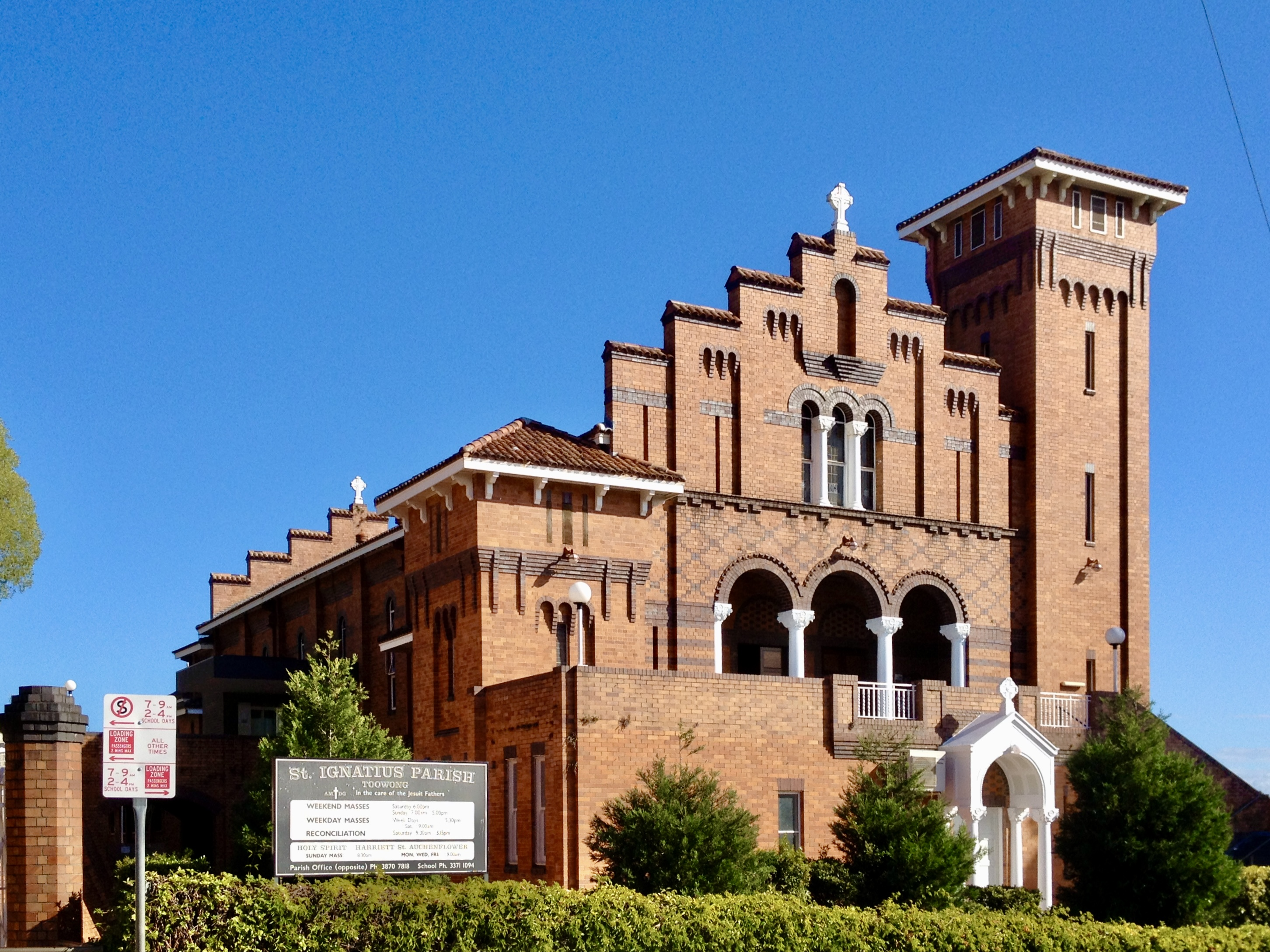
St Ignatius Church, Toowong

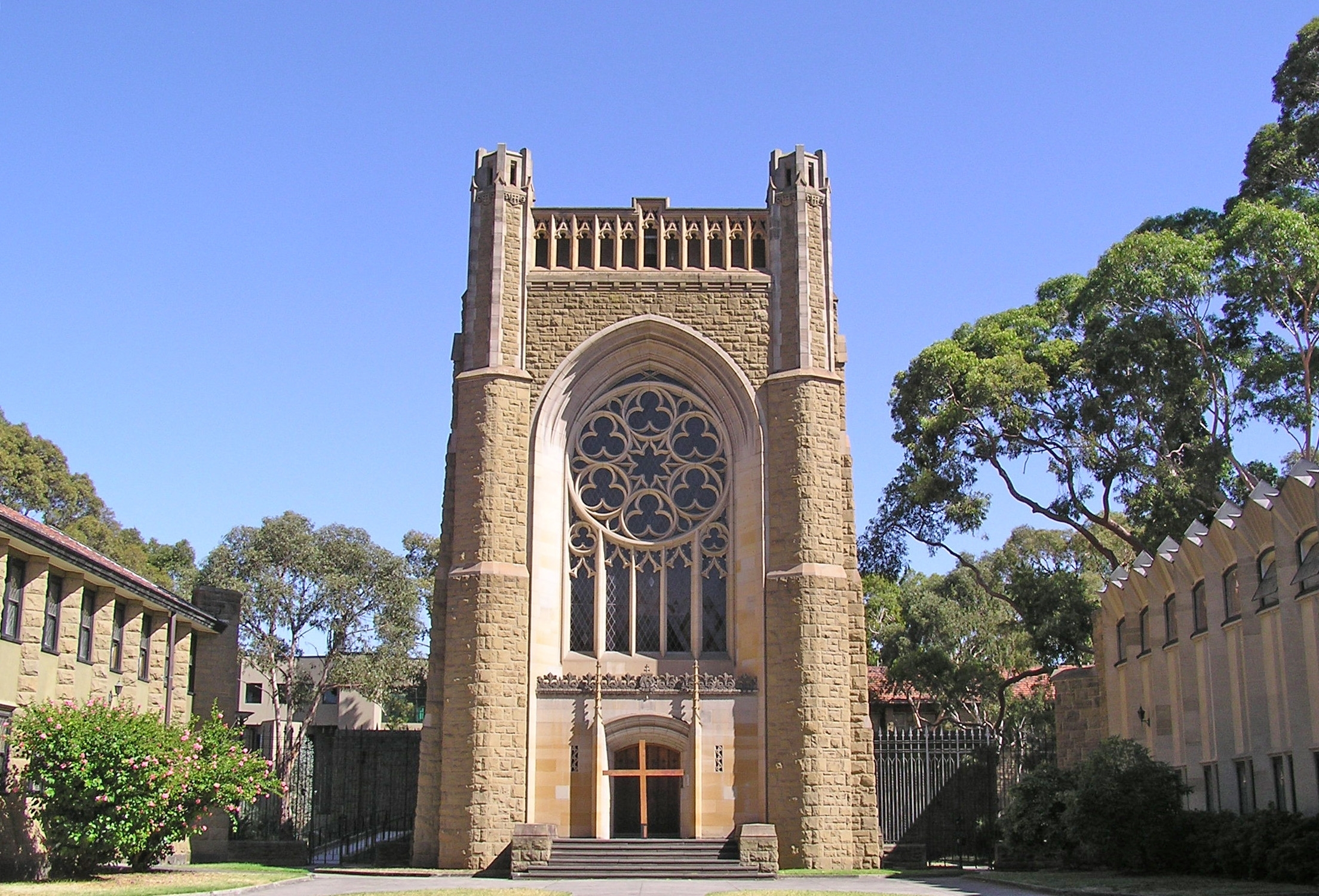
Newman College, Melbourne

- Xavier College in the Kew suburb of Melbourne (since 1872)
- St Aloysius' College in Sydney (since 1879)
- Saint Ignatius' College in Riverview near Sydney (since 1880)
- St Ignatius Loyola Church in the City of Brisbane (since 1916)
- Newman College in Melbourne (since 1918)
- St. Louis School in Claremont, Western Australia (1938–1971)
- Saint Ignatius' College in Adelaide (since 1951)
- Jesuit Social Services in Victoria (since 1977)
- Saint Ignatius College in Geelong (since 2007)

=== Micronesia ===
- Xavier High School on Weno Island (since 1952)
- Ponape Agricultural and Trade School in Pohnpei (1960s?–2005)

=== New Zealand ===
- Holy Name Seminary in Christchurch (1947–1978)
- St Ignatius Loyola Catholic College, Drury, Auckland (2024–present)
- Trinity Catholic College, Dunedin

=== Palau ===
- Sacred Heart Church in Koror (since 1921)

== See also ==
- List of Jesuit educational institutions
- List of schools named after Francis Xavier
- List of Carthusian monasteries
- List of Knights Hospitaller sites
- List of Knights Templar sites
- List of sites of the Dominican Order
