= List of Jesuit educational institutions =

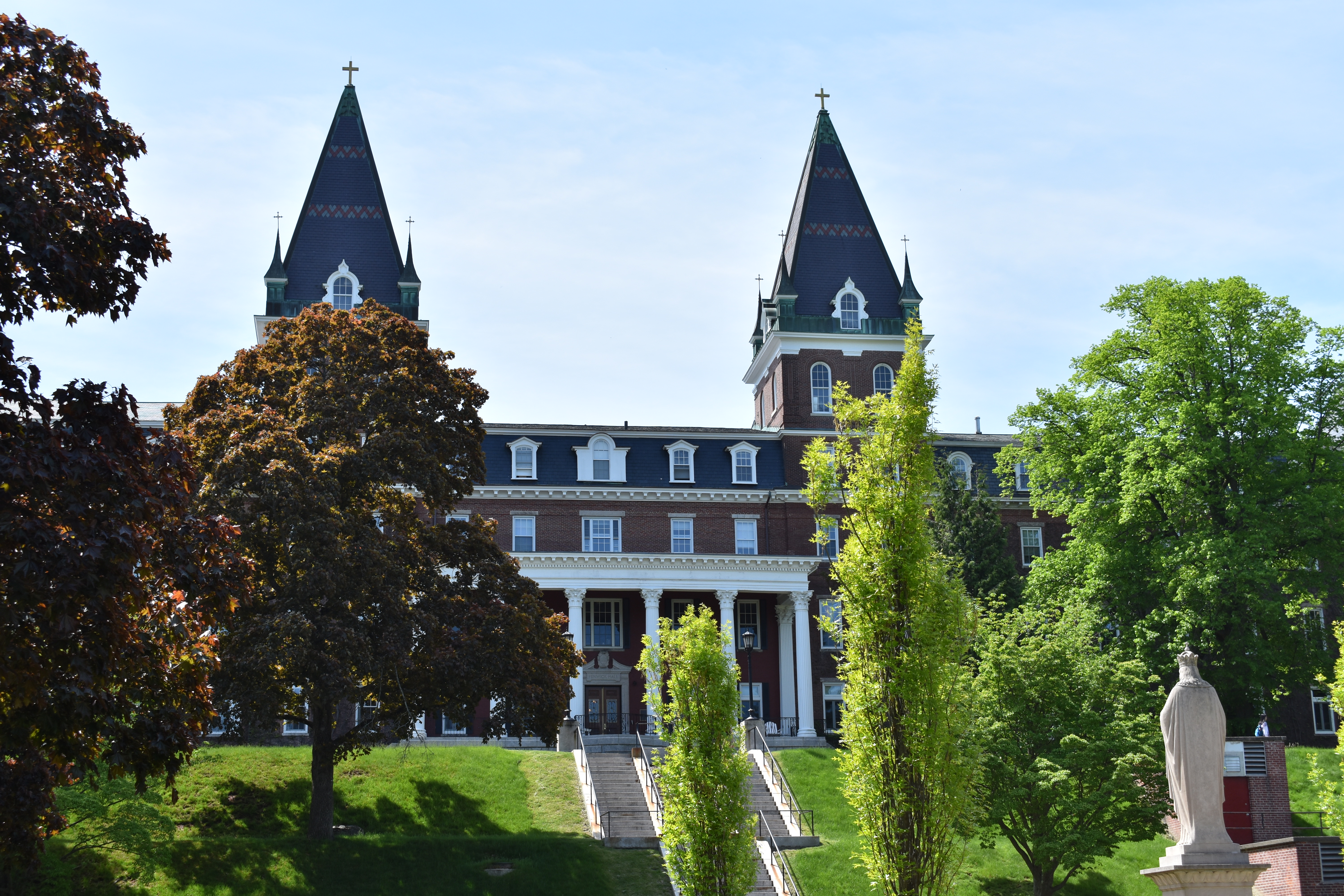
Fenwick Hall at the College of the Holy Cross in Worcester, Massachusetts

The Jesuits (Society of Jesus) in the Catholic Church have founded and managed a number of educational institutions, including the notable secondary schools, colleges, and universities listed here.

Some of these universities are in the United States where they are organized as the Association of Jesuit Colleges and Universities. In Latin America, they are organized in the Association of Universities Entrusted to the Society of Jesus in Latin America.

== List of Jesuit universities ==
This list includes four-year colleges and universities operated by the Society of Jesus. The currently listed total on this page is 190 colleges and universities. Paul Grendler has authored a history of Jesuit schools and universities from 1548 to 1773. In it, he notes that the Jesuits had established over 700 colleges and universities across Europe by 1749, with another hundred in the rest of the world, but in the aftermath of the Jesuit suppressions of the 18th and 19th centuries, all these schools were closed. The following schools were established in the post-suppression period. Secondary schools, along with sixth forms, are contained in the listing following this one. The listings are in alphabetical order by country.

=== Argentina ===
- Colegio Máximo de San José, Argentina
- Universidad de Buenos Aires, Argentina
- Facultades de Filosofía y Teología de San Miguel, San Miguel
- Universidad Católica de Córdoba, Cordoba
- Universidad del Salvador, Buenos Aires

=== Austria ===
- University of Innsbruck, Faculty of Theology
- Canisianum (Innsbruck)

=== Belgium ===
- University of Namur
- Institut Gramme
- St John Berchmans University College, Heverlee
- Saint Ignatius University Centre (UCSIA), Antwerp
- Onze-Lieve-Vrouwecollege plus (OLVC+), Antwerp

=== Belize ===
- St. John's Junior College, Belize City

=== Bolivia ===
- Luis Espinal Higher Institute of Philosophy and Humanities, Cochabamba

=== Brazil ===
- Centro Universitário da FEI (FEI), São Bernardo do Campo
- Jesuit School of Philosophy and Theology (FAJE), Minas Gerais
- Pontificia Universidade Católica do Rio de Janeiro (PUC-Rio), Rio de Janeiro
- Universidade Católica de Pernambuco (UNICAP), Recife
- Universidade do Vale do Rio dos Sinos (UNISINOS), São Leopoldo

=== Canada ===
- St. Paul's College, University of Manitoba
- Saint Mary's University, Halifax
- Regis College, theological faculty, University of Toronto
- Campion College, Regina, University of Regina

=== Chile ===
- Universidad Alberto Hurtado, Santiago, Chile

=== China ===
- The Beijing Center for Chinese Studies

=== Colombia ===
- Pontificia Universidad Javeriana, Bogotá
- Pontificia Universidad Javeriana, Cali

=== Croatia ===
- Faculty of Philosophy and Religious Sciences, Zagreb

=== Democratic Republic of Congo ===
- Loyola University of Congo, Kinshasa

=== Dominican Republic ===
- Loyola Polytechnic Institute, San Cristóbal
- Pedro Francisco Bono Institute, Santo Domingo

=== Ecuador ===
- Pontificia Universidad Católica del Ecuador

=== El Salvador ===
- Universidad Centroamericana "José Simeón Cañas"(UCA), Antiguo Cuscatlán

=== France ===
- Centre Sèvres, Paris

=== Germany ===
- Munich School of Philosophy, Munich
- Philosophisch-Theologische Hochschule Sankt Georgen, Frankfurt

=== Guatemala ===
- Universidad Rafael Landívar, Guatemala City

=== India ===
==== Andhra Pradesh ====
- St. Xavier's College of Education, Hindupur
- Andhra Loyola College, Vijayawada
- Loyola Public School, Guntur

==== Bihar ====
- St. Xavier's College, Patna
- St. Xavier's College of Education, Patna

==== Goa ====
- St. Xavier's College, Mapusa

==== Gujarat ====
- St. Xavier's College, Ahmedabad

==== Jharkhand ====
- Loyola College of Education, Jamshedpur
- St. Xavier's College, Maharo, Dumka
- St. Xavier's College, Ranchi
- Xavier Institute of Social Service, Ranchi
- XLRI - Xavier School of Management, Jamshedpur

==== Karnataka ====
- Loyola College, Manvi, Raichur
- St. Aloysius College, Mangalore
- St. Aloysius Evening College (Mangalore)
- St. Aloysius Industrial Training Institute, Mangalore
- St. Aloysius Institute of Education, Mangalore
- St. Joseph's Institutions, Bangalore
- St. Joseph's University, Bangalore
- St. Joseph's College, Hassan
- St. Joseph's College of Commerce (Autonomous). Bangalore
- St. Joseph's Community College, Bangalore
- St. Joseph's Evening College (Autonomous), Bangalore
- St. Joseph’s College of Law, Bangalore
- St. Joseph's Institute of Management, Bangalore

==== Kerala ====
- Loyola School, Trivandrum
- Loyola College of Social Sciences, Thiruvananthapuram
- St. Xavier's College, Thumba, Thiruvananthapuram
- St. Michael's AIHSS, Kannur

==== Madhya Pradesh ====
- Xavier Institute of Development Action and Studies (XIDAS), Jabalpur

==== Maharashtra ====
- St. Joseph’s Technical Institute, Pune
- St. Xavier's College, Mumbai (including Xavier Institute of Management & Research)
- St. Xavier's Institute of Education, Mumbai
- St. Xavier's Technical Institute, Mumbai
- Xavier Institute of Engineering, Mumbai

==== Odisha ====
- Xavier Institute of Management, Bhubaneswar
- XIM University, Bhubaneswar

==== Rajasthan ====
- St Xaviers College, Jaipur
- St. Xavier's College, Nevta, Jaipur

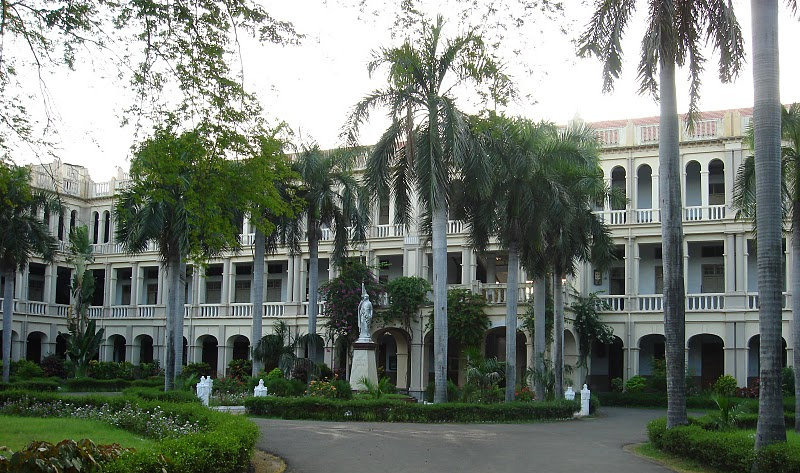
Loyola College, Chennai

==== Tamil Nadu ====
- Loyola College, Chennai
- Loyola-ICAM College of Engineering & Technology, Chennai
- Loyola College of Education, Chennai
- Loyola College, Mettala
- Loyola Institute of Business Administration, Chennai
- St. Joseph's College, Tiruchirappalli
- St. Xavier's College, Palayamkottai
- St. Xavier's College of Education, Palayamkottai
- Xavier Institute of Business Administration, Palayamkottai

==== Telangana ====
- Loyola Academy, Secunderabad
- St. Patrick's High School, Secunderabad

==== West Bengal ====
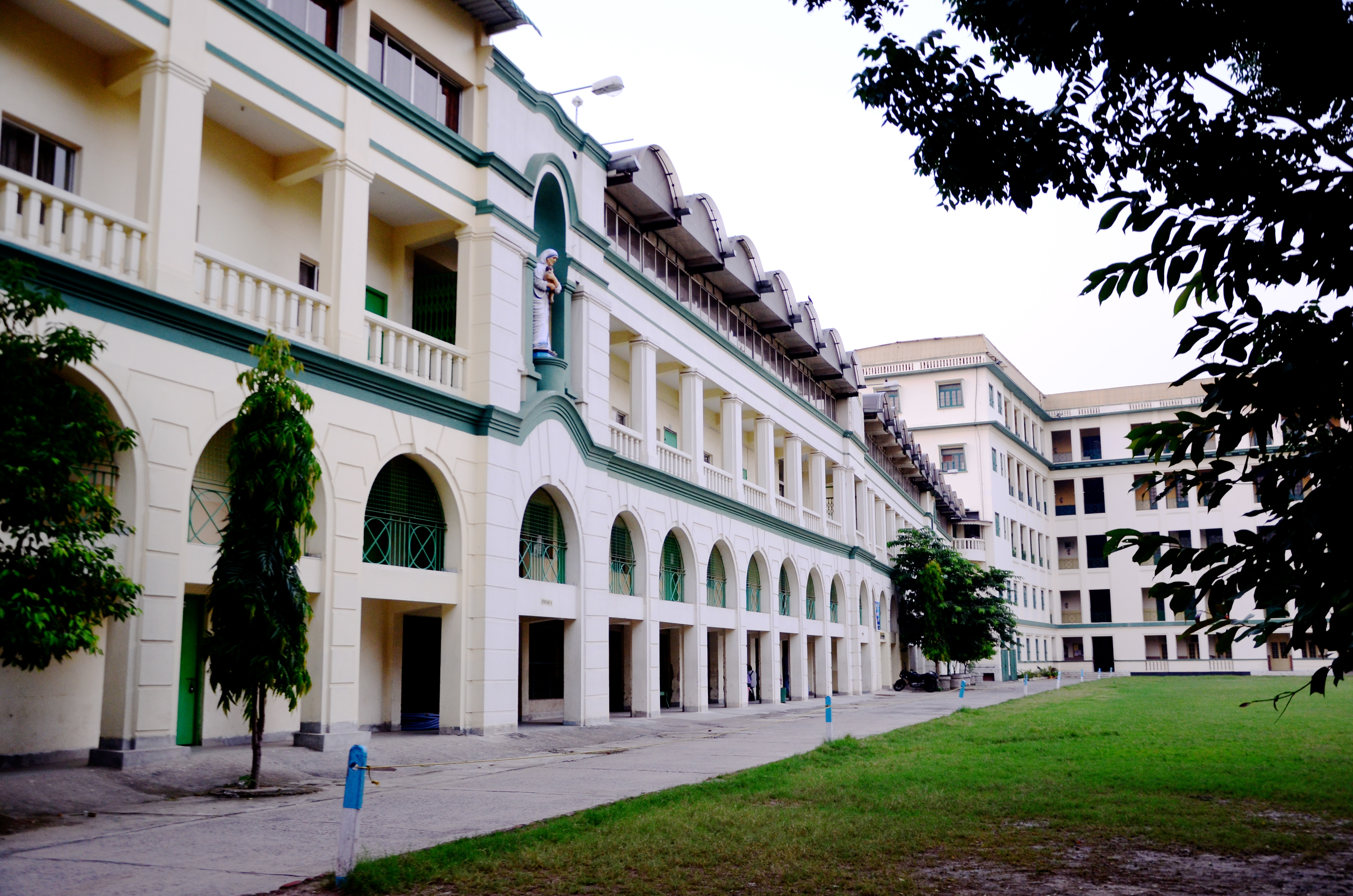
St. Xavier's College, Kolkata

- St. Xavier's School, Durgapur
- North Bengal St. Xavier's College, Jalpaiguri
- St. Joseph's College, Darjeeling
- St. Lawrence High School, Kolkata
- St. Xavier's College, Asansol
- St. Xavier's College, Burdwan
- St. Xavier's College, Kolkata
- St. Xavier's University, Kolkata

=== Indonesia ===
- Sanata Dharma University, Yogyakarta
- Polytechnic ATMI Surakarta, Surakarta
- Sekolah Tinggi Filsafat Driyarkara, Jakarta

=== Iraq ===
- Al Hikma College – nationalized during the Baath regime

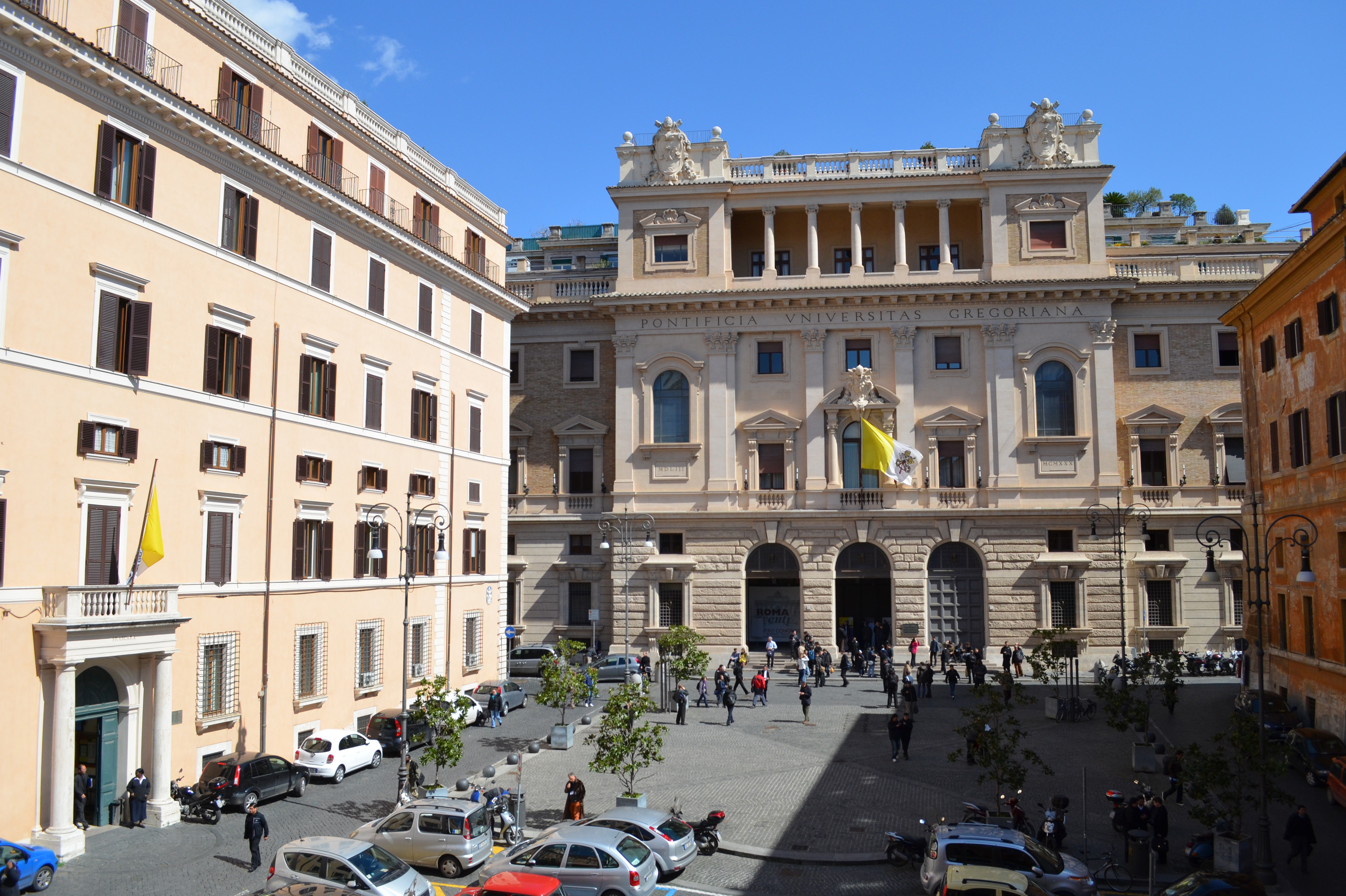
Pontifical Gregorian University, Rome

=== Italy ===
- John Felice Rome Center, Loyola University Chicago, Rome
- Pontifical Biblical Institute, Rome
- Pontifical Gregorian University, Rome – formerly Collegio Romano
- Pontifical Oriental Institute, Rome
- University of Messina (Ignatian origins)

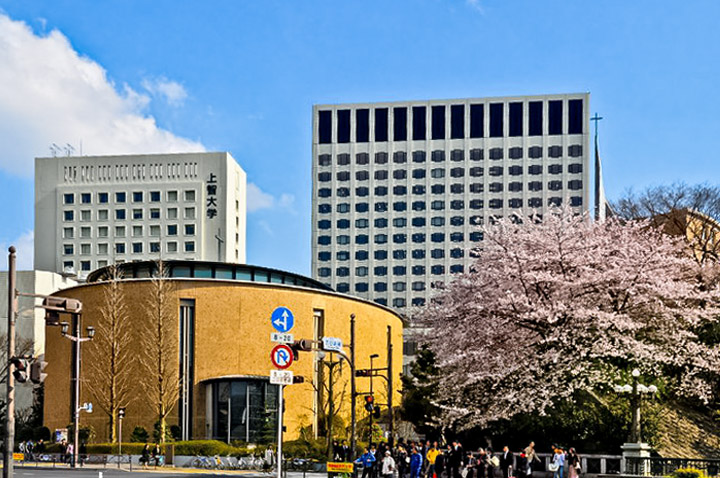
Sophia University, Tokyo

=== Japan ===
- Elisabeth University of Music, Hiroshima
- Sophia University, Tokyo

=== Kenya ===
- Hekima University College, Nairobi

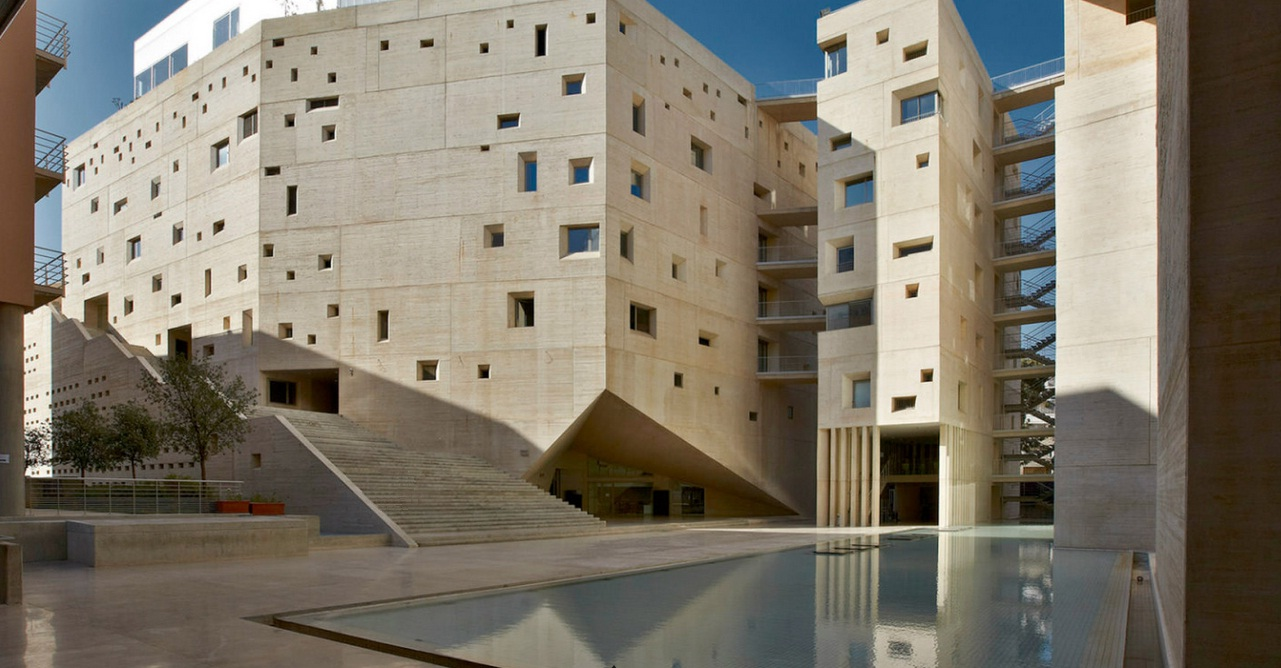
Université Saint-Joseph, Beirut

=== Lebanon ===
- Université Saint-Joseph, Beirut
- Collège Notre-Dame de Jamhour, Baabda

=== Madagascar ===
- Ecole Professionnelle Supérieure Agricole Bevalala, Antananarivo
- Saint Michael Higher Technical Institute, Amparibe, Antananarivo
- Saint Paul Tsaramasoandro Philosophate, Antananarivo
- SAMIS-ESIC School of Information and Communication, Antananarivo

=== Mexico ===
- Ibero-American University of Torreón, Torreón
- Ibero-American University Tijuana, Tijuana
- Universidad Iberoamericana, Mexico City
- Universidad Iberoamericana León, León
- Universidad Iberoamericana Puebla, Puebla de Zaragoza
- Intercultural Institute of Ayuuk, Oaxaca
- ITESO, Universidad Jesuita de Guadalajara

=== Nepal ===
- St. Xavier's College, Maitighar, Kathmandu

=== Nicaragua ===
- Central American University, Managua. Closed and expropriated by the Sandinista regime

=== Paraguay ===
- Universidad Jesuita del Paraguay, Asuncion

=== Peru ===
- Antonio Ruiz de Montoya University, Lima
- Universidad del Pacífico, Lima

=== Philippines ===
Ateneo de Manila University, Philippines

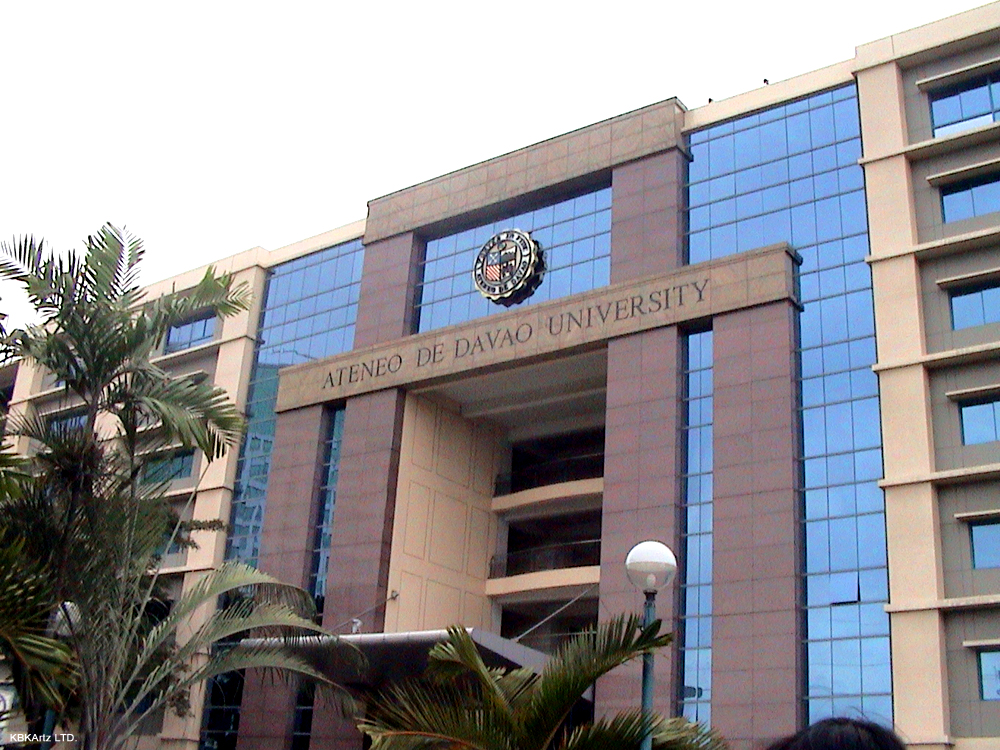
Ateneo de Davao University, Philippines

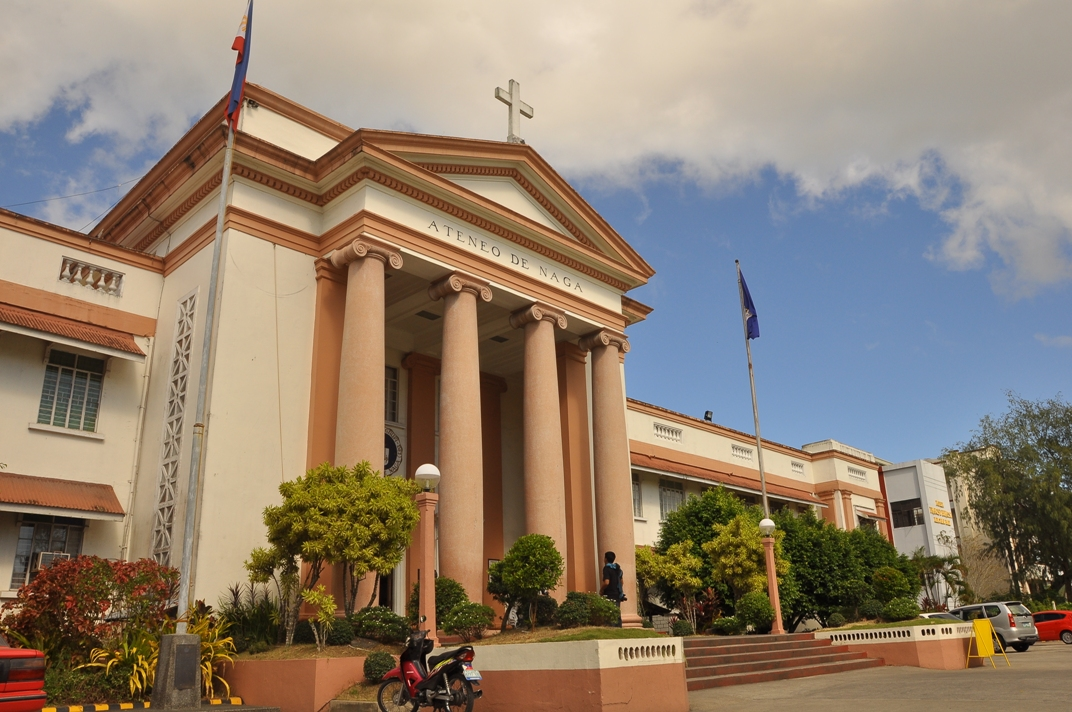
Ateneo de Naga University, Philippines

Ateneo de Zamboanga University, Philippines

(Note: Primarily, only in the Universities of Italyand the Jesuit Higher Education Institutes of the Philippines, are that which often refers to Colleges and Universities as Ateneos, rather than Colleges or Universities.)

- Ateneo de Davao University, Davao City
- Ateneo de Manila University, Quezon City, Metro Manila
- Ateneo de Naga University, Naga City Camarines Sur
- Ateneo de Tuguegarao, Tuguegarao City, Cagayan (closed in 1962)
- Ateneo de Zamboanga University, Zamboanga City
- Ateneo de Cagayan – Xavier University, Cagayan de Oro, Misamis Oriental
- Loyola College of Culion, Culion, Palawan
- San Jose Seminary, Quezon City, Metro Manila

=== Poland ===
- Collegium Nobilium (Jesuit) in Warsaw
- Jesuit College in Kalisz
- Jesuit University Ignatianum, Kraków
- Collegium Bobolanum, Warsaw

=== Romania ===
- Jesuit Academy of Cluj, Cluj-Napoca; from university, after 1773

=== South Korea ===
- Sogang University, Seoul, South Korea

=== Sweden ===
- The Newman Institute, Uppsala

=== Spain ===
- St. James the Apostle College, Vigo
- Comillas Pontifical University, Madrid
- Deusto University, Bilbao
- ESADE Barcelona, also in Madrid
- IQS – Institut Químic de Sarrià, Barcelona
- Holy Family University Center, Úbeda
- Loyola University of Andalusia
- Saint Louis University Madrid Campus
- University of Agricultural Engineering, Valladolid

=== Taiwan ===
- Fu Jen Catholic University, Taipei

=== Thailand ===
- Xavier Learning Community (XLC), Chiang Rai, Thailand

=== Timor-Leste ===
- St. John de Britto Institute (Instituto São João de Brito), Kasait-Ulmera, Timor-Leste

=== United Kingdom ===
- Campion Hall, Oxford University, Oxford

=== United States ===
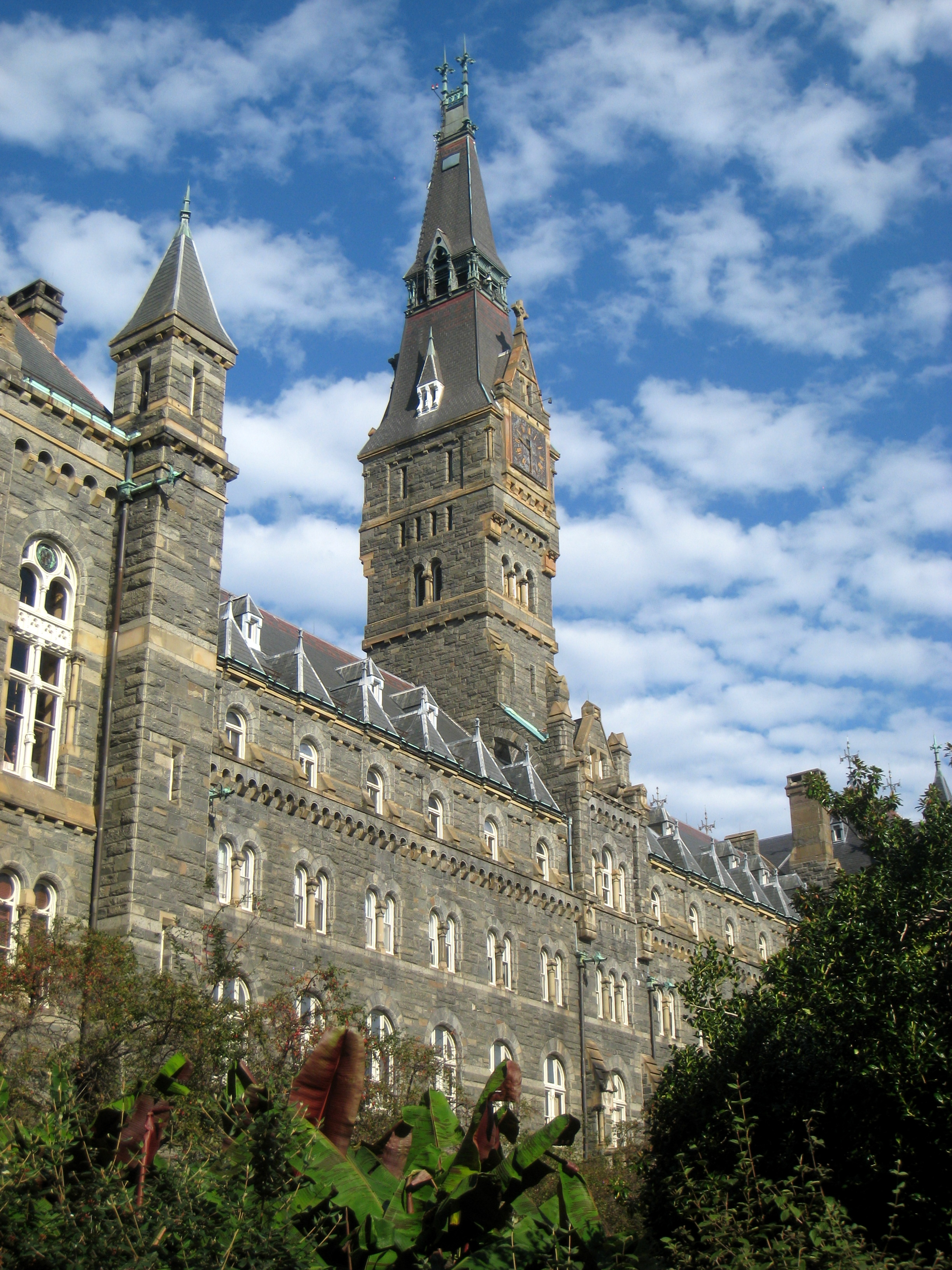
Georgetown University, Washington, D.C.

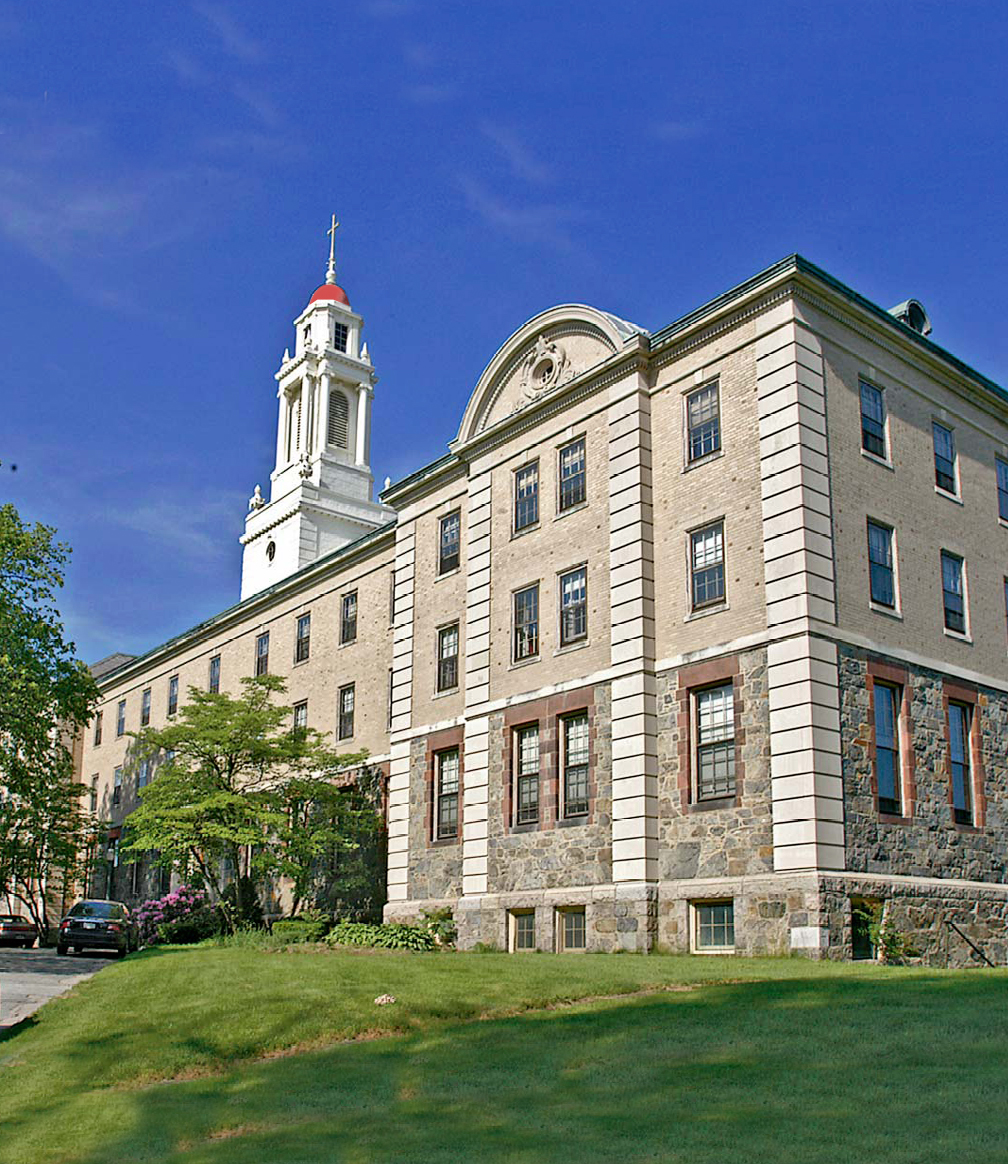
Boston College, School of Theology and Ministry

- Boston College, Chestnut Hill, Massachusetts
- Boston College School of Theology and Ministry, Brighton, Massachusetts
- Canisius University, Buffalo, New York
- College of the Holy Cross, Worcester, Massachusetts
- Creighton University, Omaha, Nebraska
- Fairfield University, Fairfield, Connecticut
- Fordham University, New York City
- Georgetown University, Washington, D.C.
- Gonzaga University, Spokane, Washington
- Jesuit School of Theology of Santa Clara University, Berkeley, California
- John Carroll University, University Heights, Ohio
- Le Moyne College, Syracuse, New York
- Loyola Marymount University, Los Angeles, California
- Loyola University Chicago, Chicago, Illinois
- Loyola University Maryland, Baltimore, Maryland
- Loyola University New Orleans, New Orleans, Louisiana
- Marquette University, Milwaukee, Wisconsin
- Regis University, Denver, Colorado
- Rockhurst University, Kansas City, Missouri
- Saint Joseph's University, Philadelphia, Pennsylvania
- Saint Louis University, St. Louis, Missouri
- Saint Peter's University, Jersey City, New Jersey
- Santa Clara University, Santa Clara, California
- Seattle University, Seattle, Washington
- Spring Hill College, Mobile, Alabama
- University of Detroit Mercy, Detroit, Michigan
- University of San Francisco, San Francisco, California
- University of Scranton, Scranton, Pennsylvania
- Xavier University, Cincinnati, Ohio

=== Uruguay ===
- Universidad Católica del Uruguay, Montevideo

=== Venezuela ===
- Jesus the Worker University Institute, Caracas
- Universidad Católica Andrés Bello, Caracas
- Catholic University of Tachira, San Cristóbal

=== Zambia ===
- Charles Lwanga College of Education, Chisekesi

=== Zimbabwe ===
- Arrupe Jesuit University, Harare, Zimbabwe

== List of defunct Jesuit Universities ==
=== Canada ===
- Loyola College, now a campus of Concordia University, Montreal
- Collège Sainte-Marie, merged into Université du Québec à Montréal, Montreal, in 1969

=== China ===
- Aurora University (Shanghai) (1902–1952)

=== Germany ===
- Jesuit College of Ingolstadt, closed in 1773
- University of Ingolstadt, Ingolstadt – closed in 1800

=== Malta ===
- Collegium Melitense, Valletta (1592–1768, predecessor of the University of Malta)

=== New Zealand ===
- Holy Name Seminary, Christchurch (closed in 1978)

=== United Kingdom ===
- Heythrop College, University of London, London

== List of Jesuit secondary schools ==
Below are listed notable Jesuit high schools or secondary schools, many of which grew into Jesuit colleges or universities, or formed in association with them. This list includes schools at the sixth form level, as distinguished from four-year colleges and universities (above).

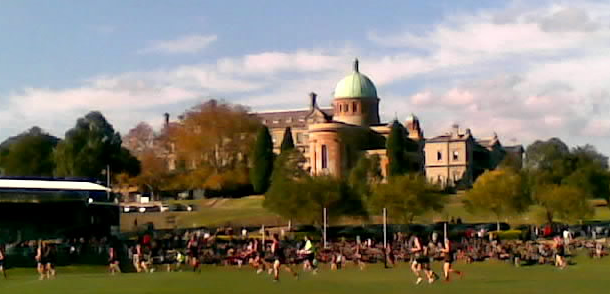
Xavier College, Melbourne, chapel

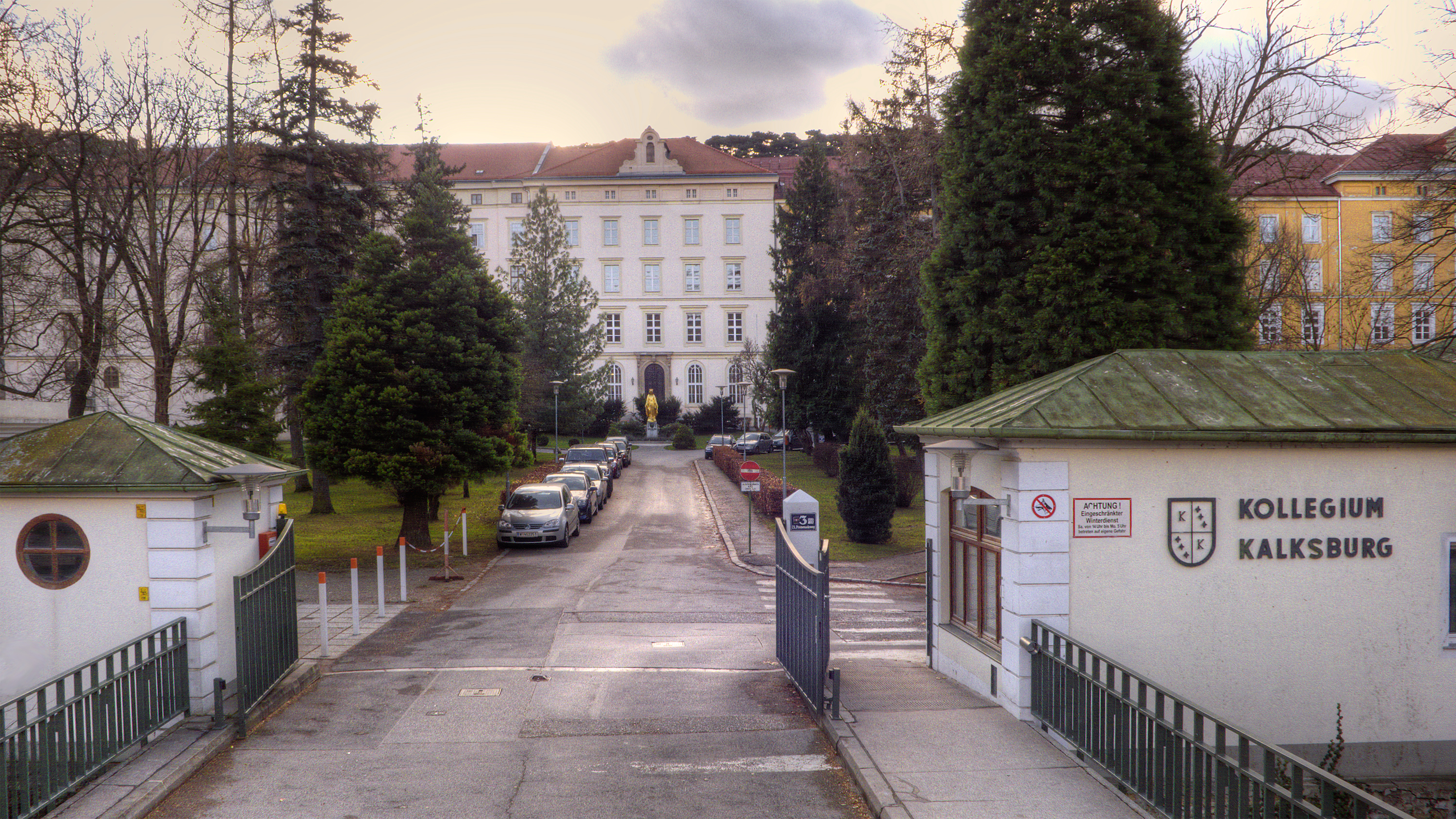
Kollegium Kalksburg

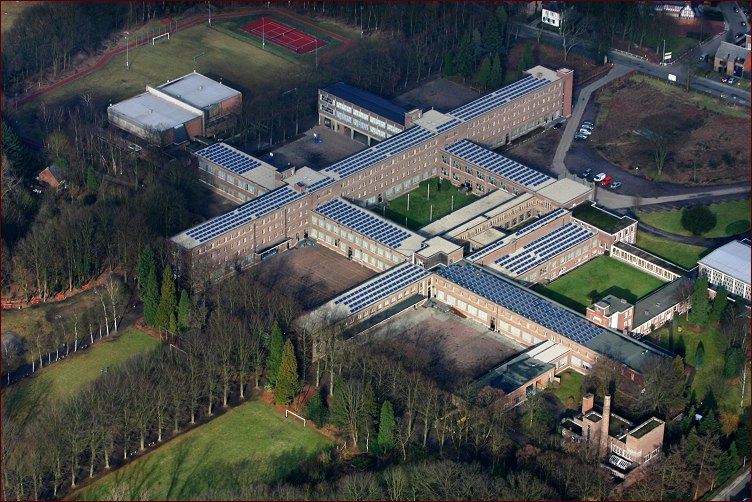
Sint-Jozefscollege, Turnhout

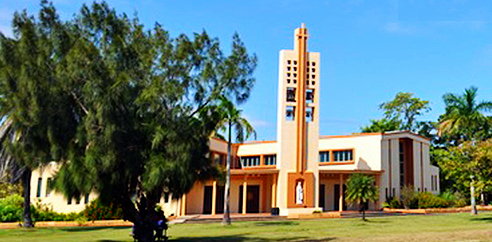
St. John's College, Belize, chapel

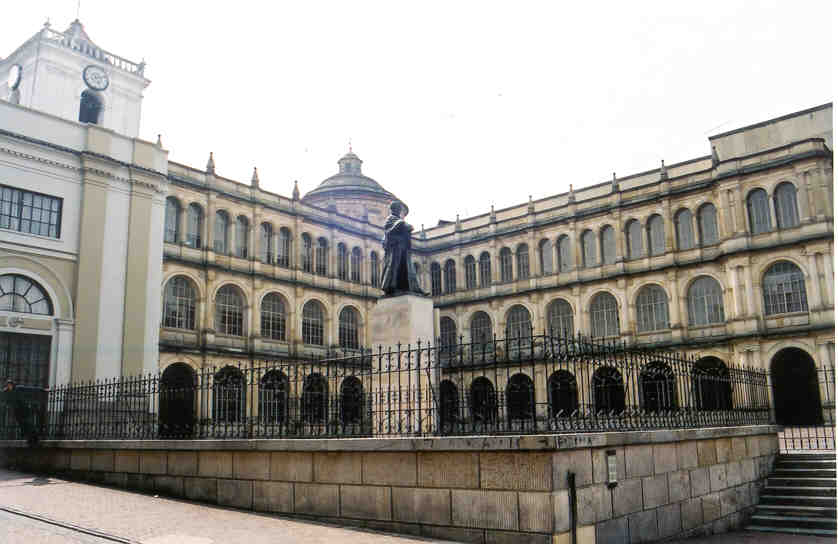
Colegio Mayor de San Bartolomé, Bogotá

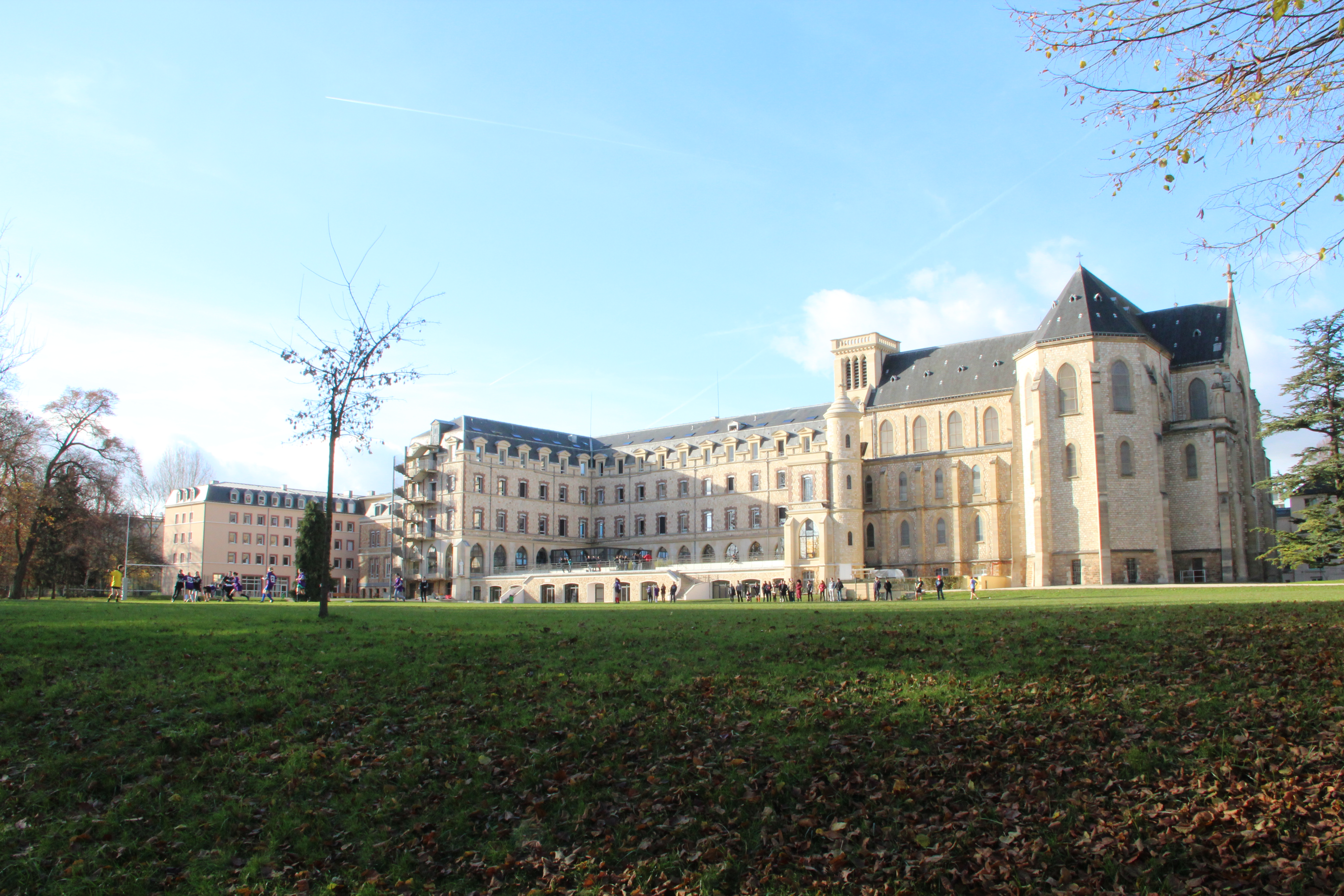
Lycée Sainte-Geneviève, Versailles

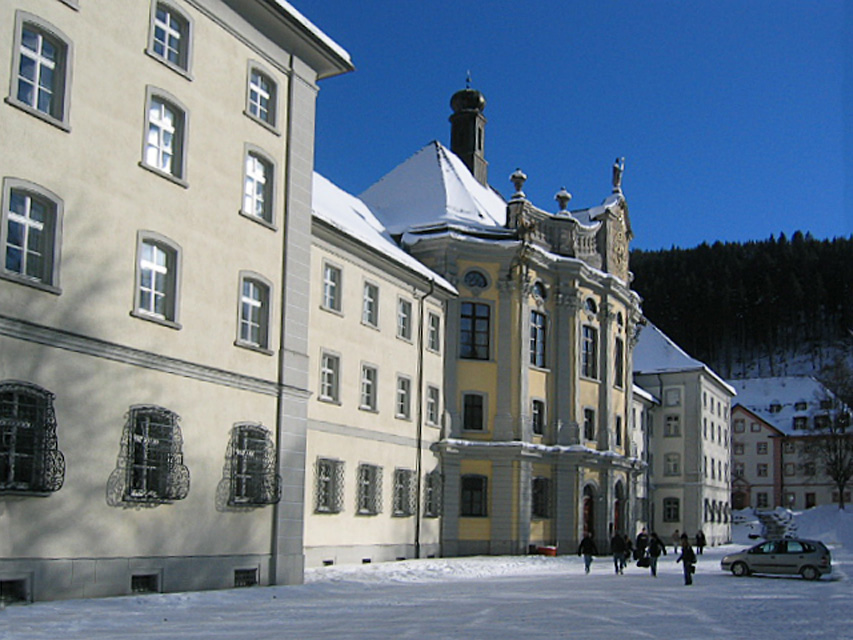
Kollegs St. Blasien, Black Forest

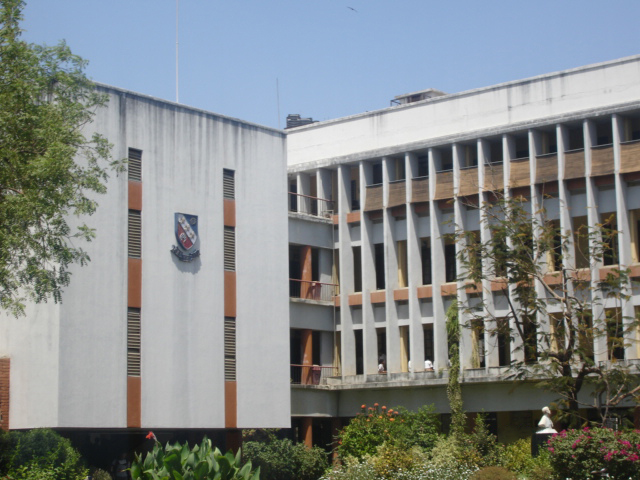
St. Xavier's Loyola Hall, Ahmedabad

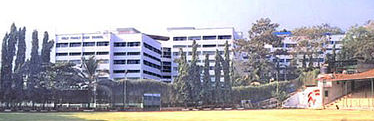
Holy Family, Mumbai

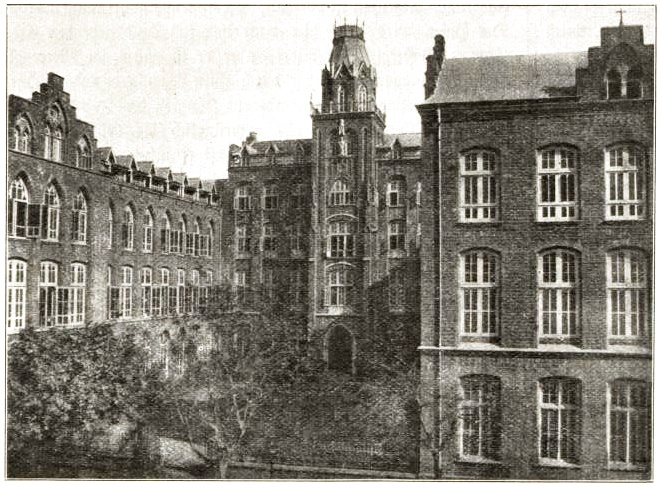
St. Xavier's High School, Mumbai

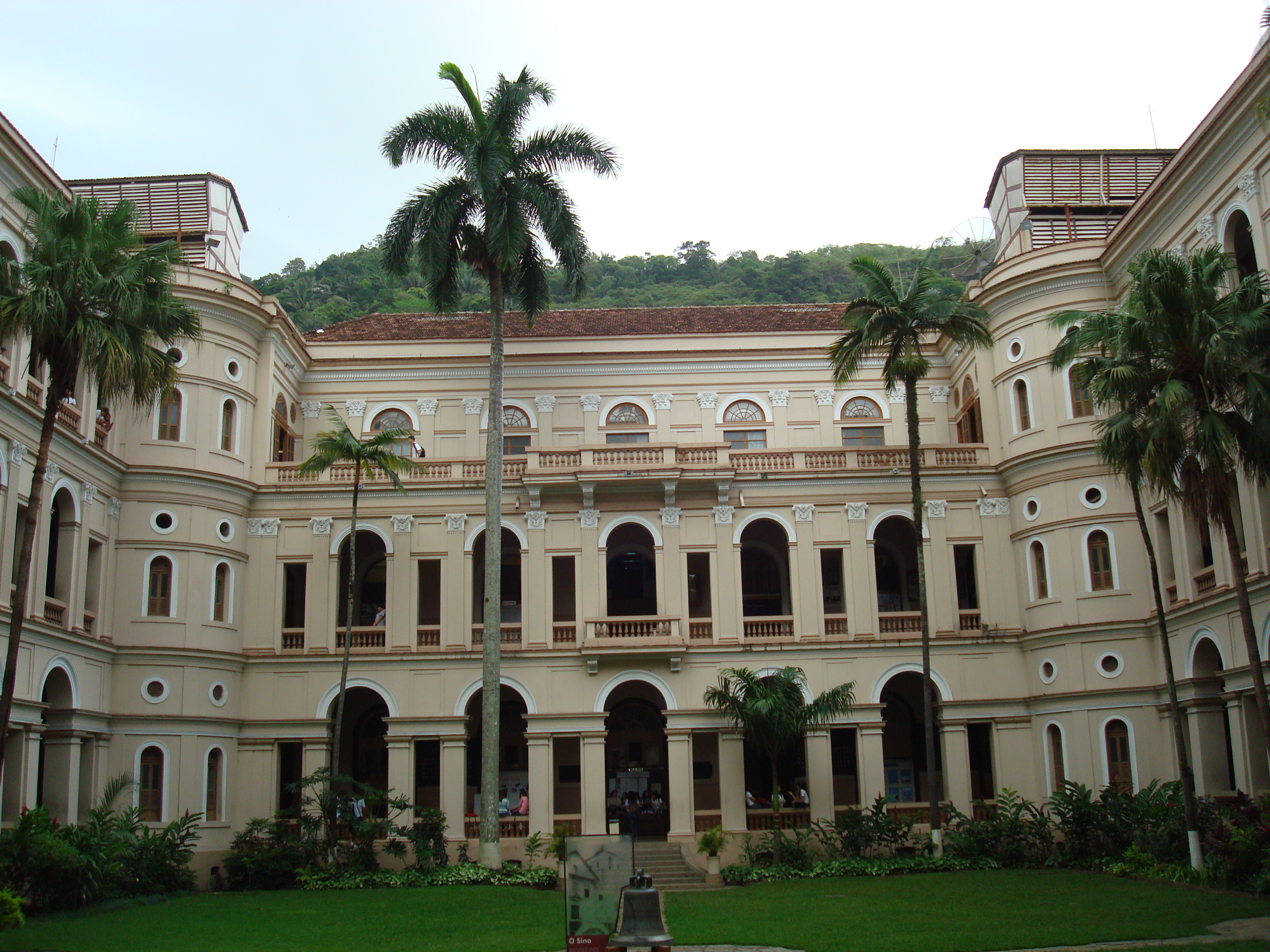
St. Ignatius, Rio de Janeiro

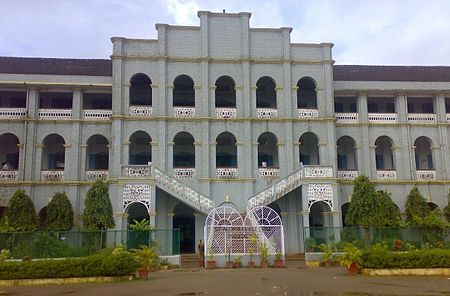
St. Aloysius, Mangalore

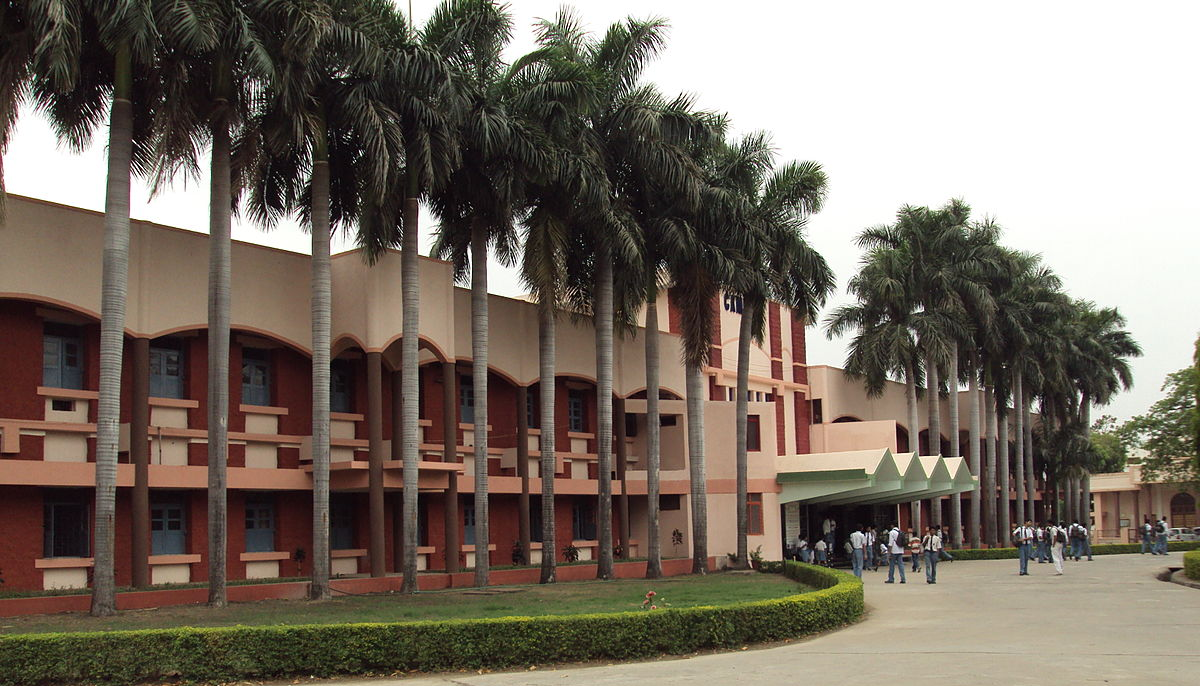
Campion School, Bhopal

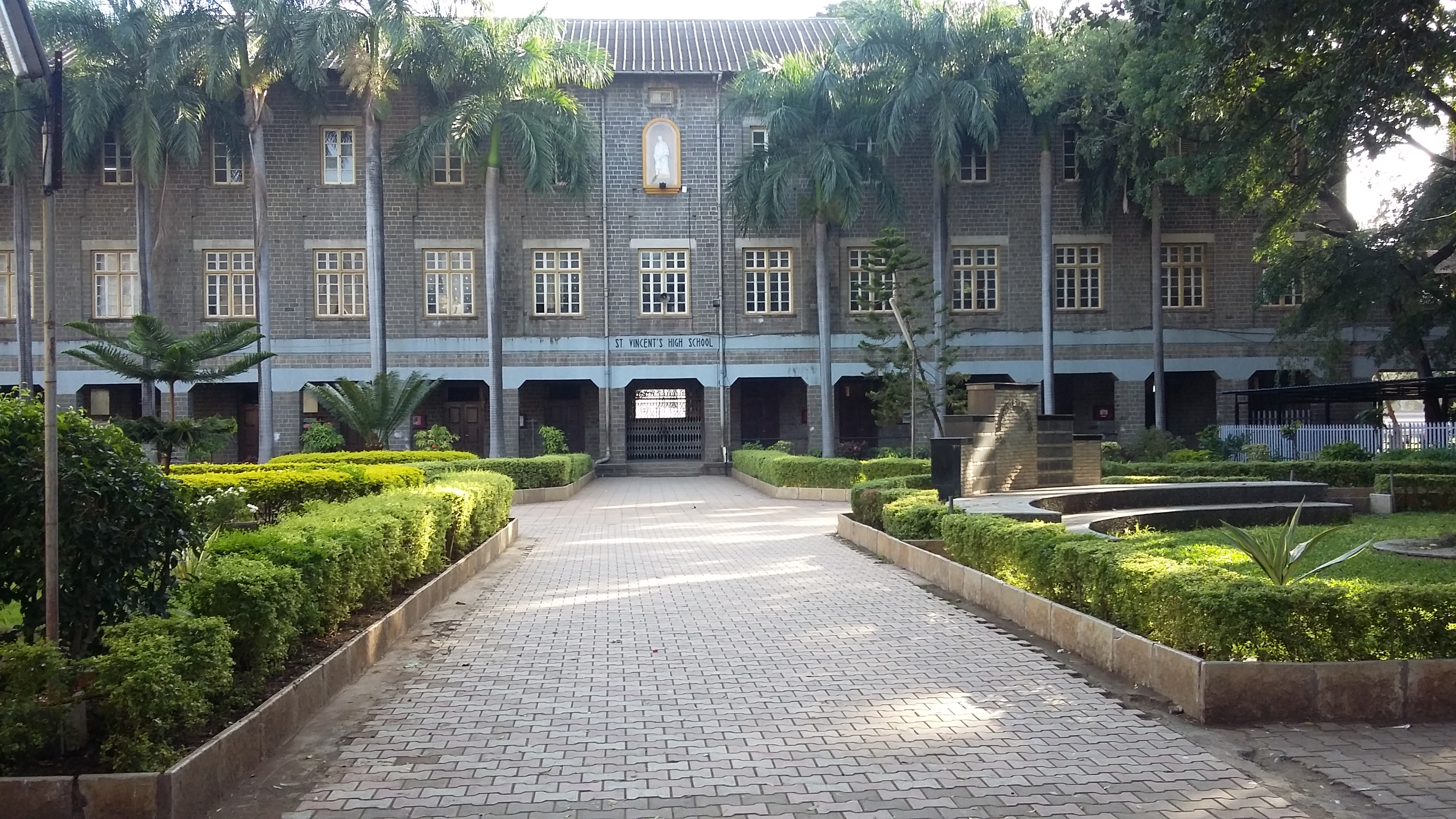
St. Vincent's, Pune

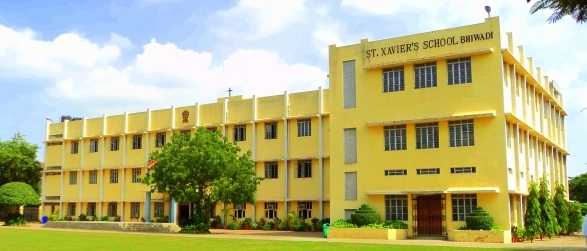
St. Xavier's, Bhiwadi

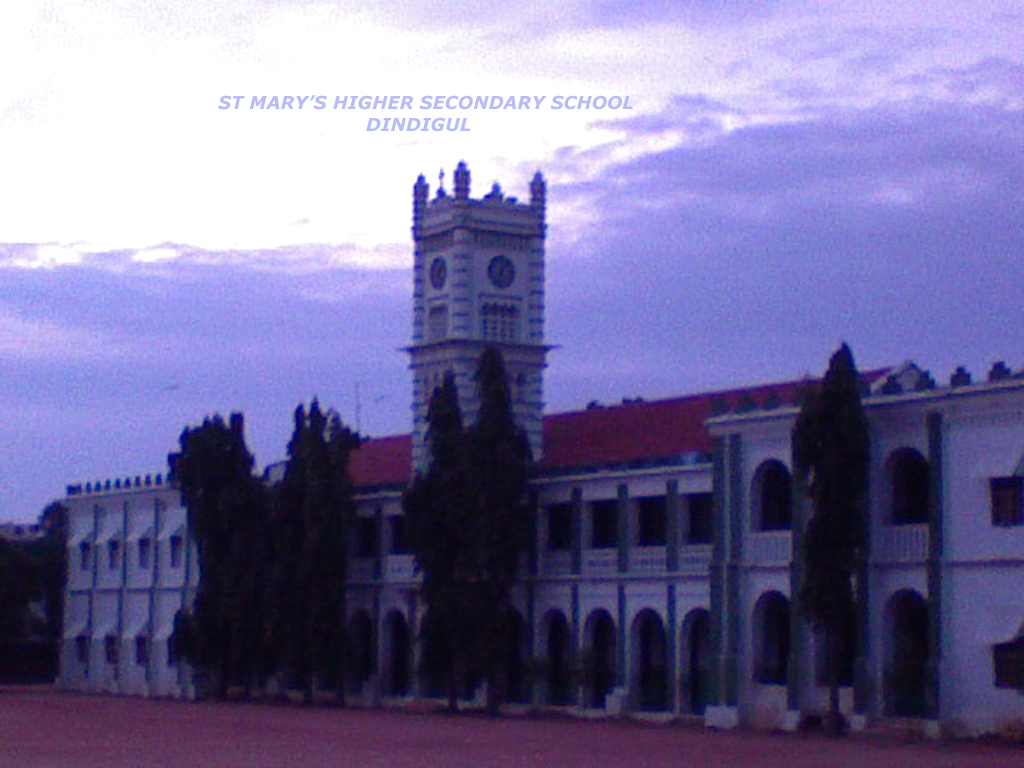
St. Mary's Dindigul

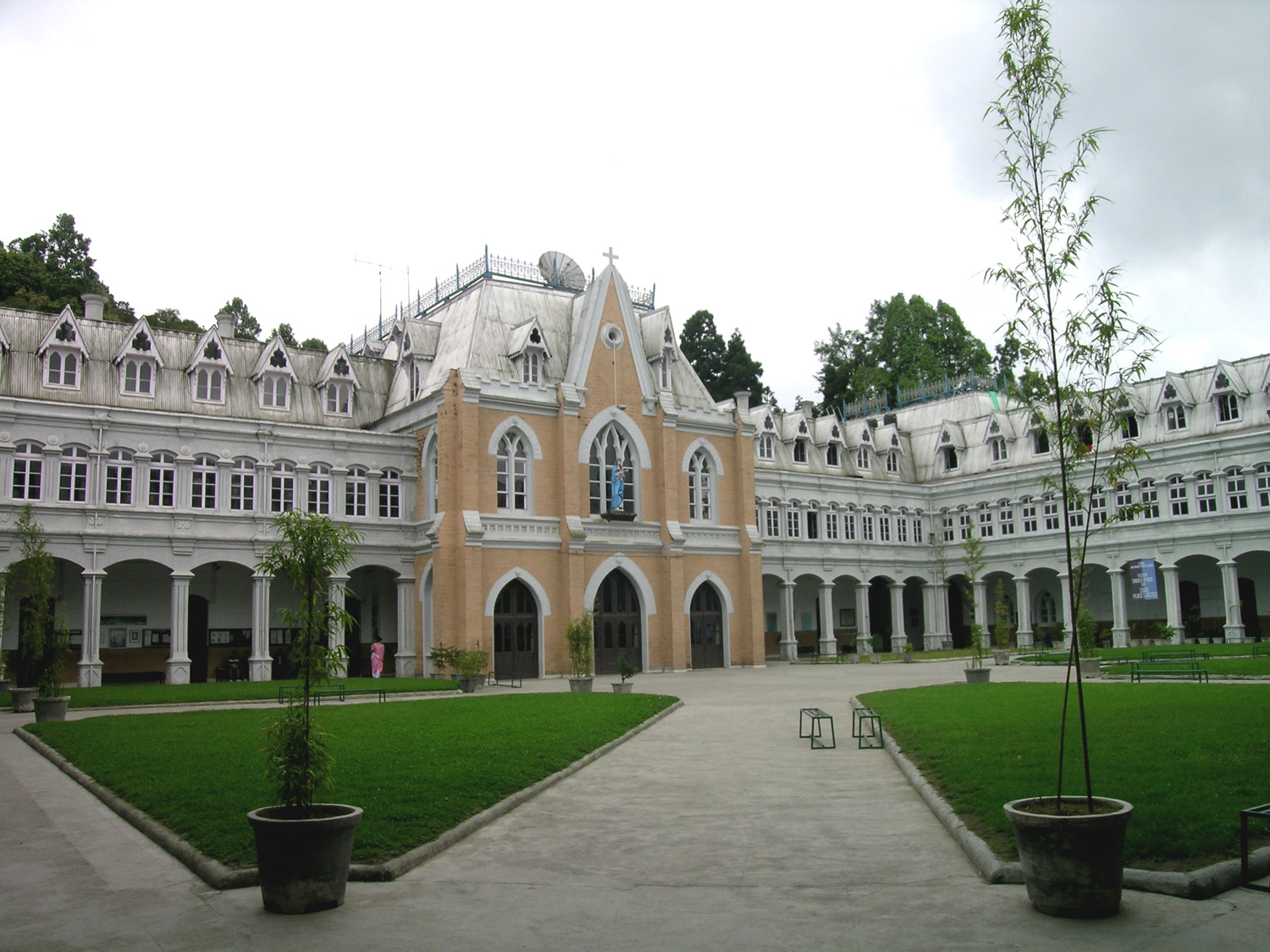
St. Joseph's, Darjeeling

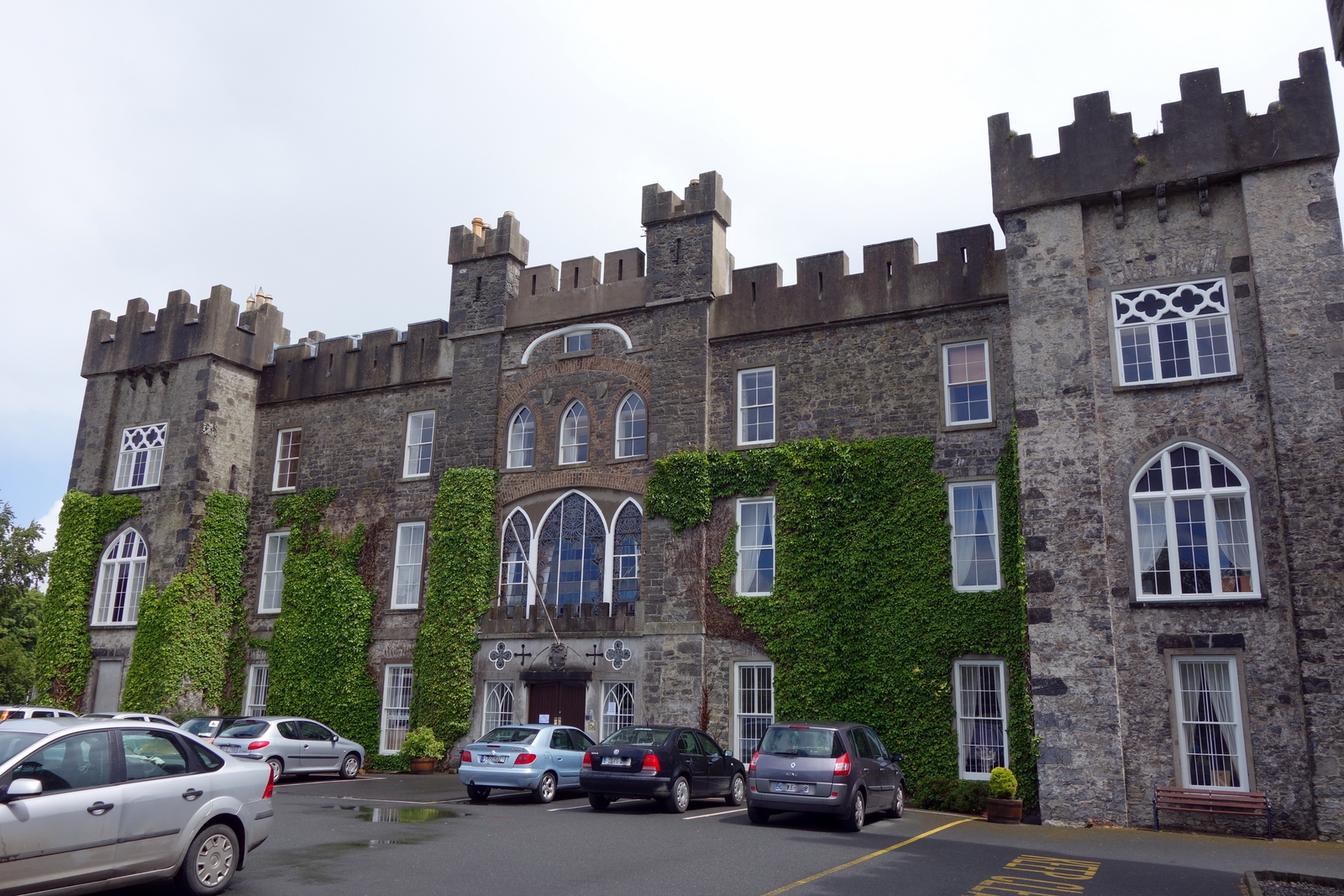
Clongowes Wood, Kildare

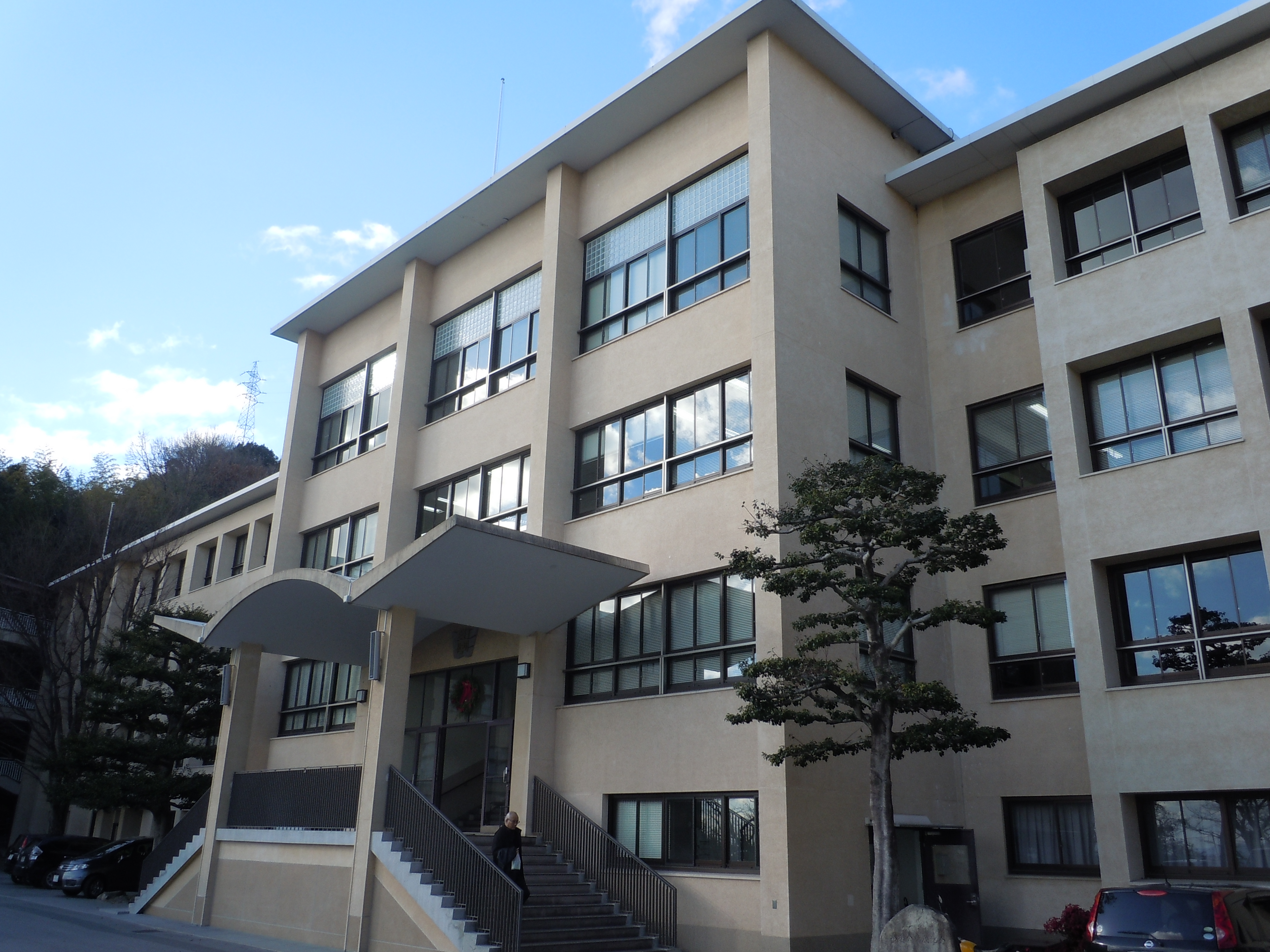
Hiroshima Academy

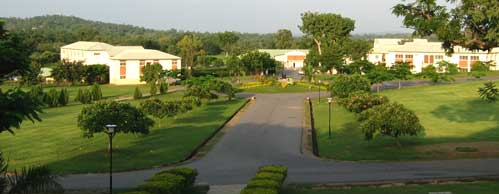
Loyola Jesuit College, Abuja

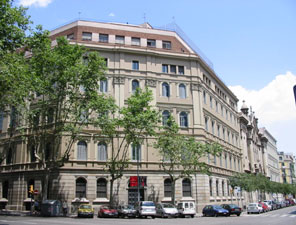
Casp-Sacred Heart, Barcelona

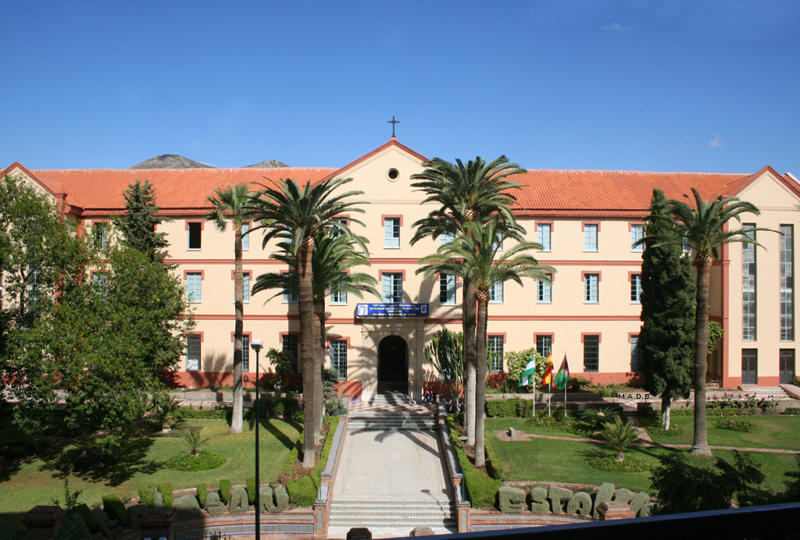
San Estanislao de Kostka, Málaga

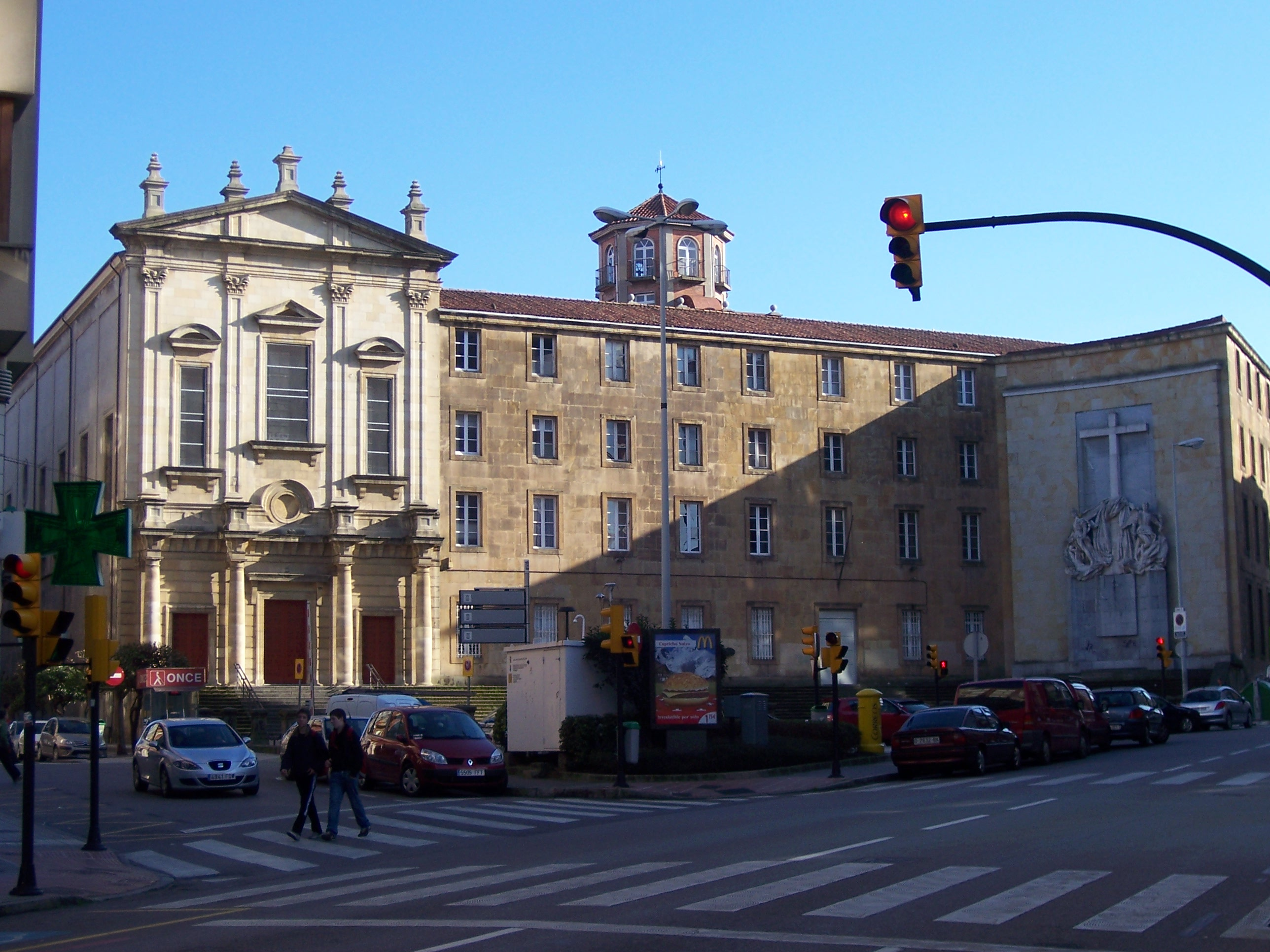
Inmculada, Gijón

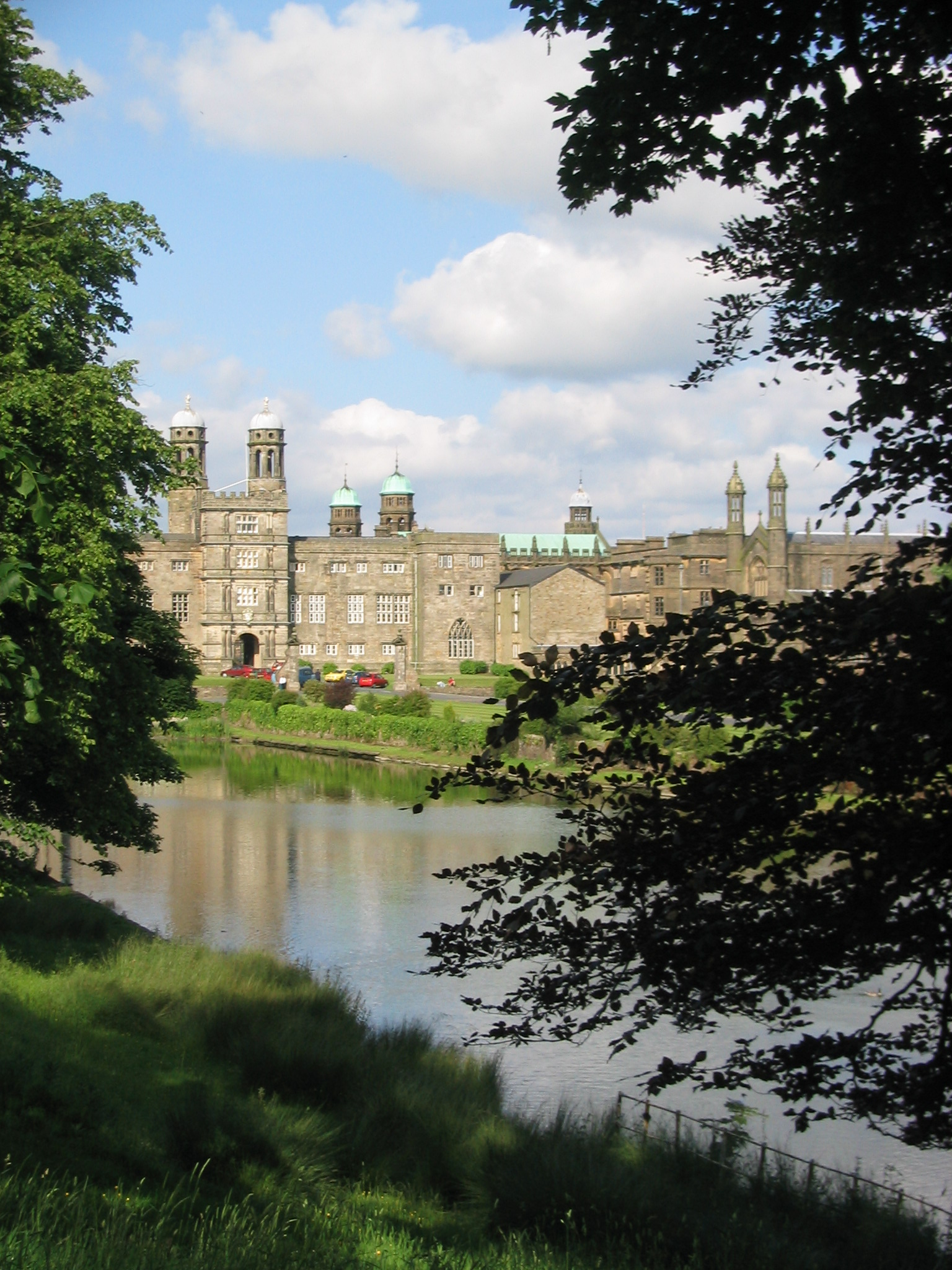
Stonyhurst, Lancashire

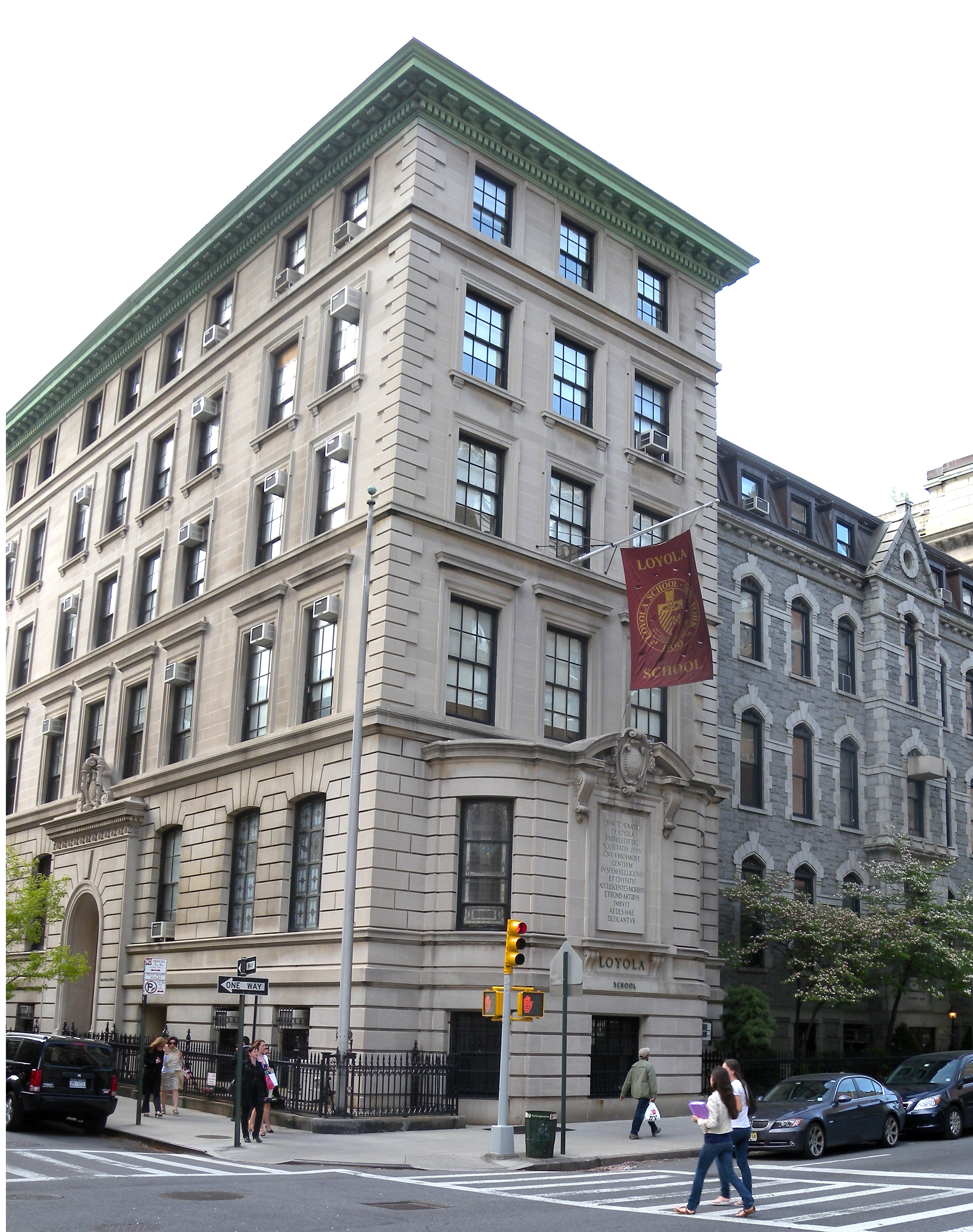
Loyola School, New York City

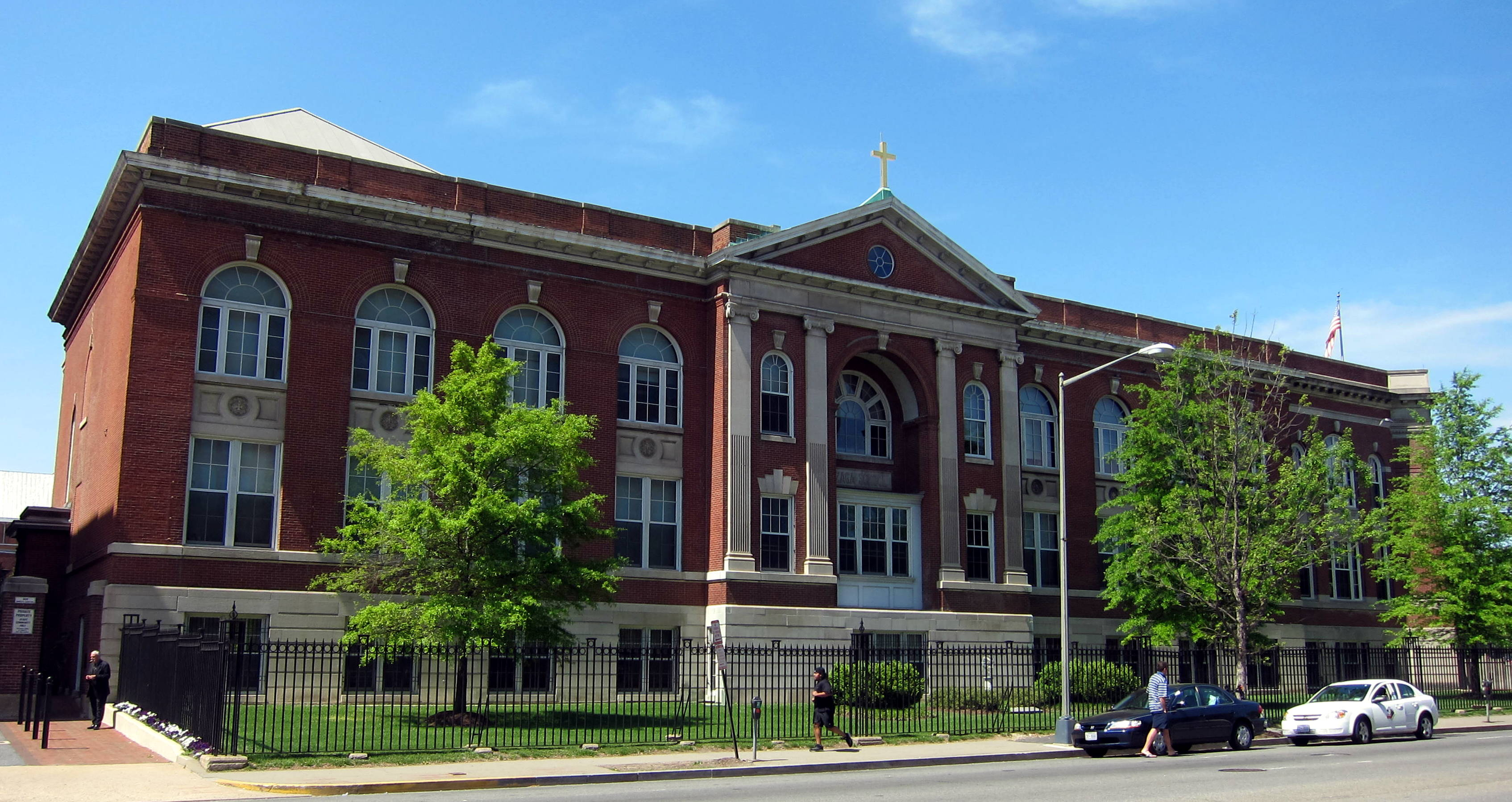
Gonzaga, Washington

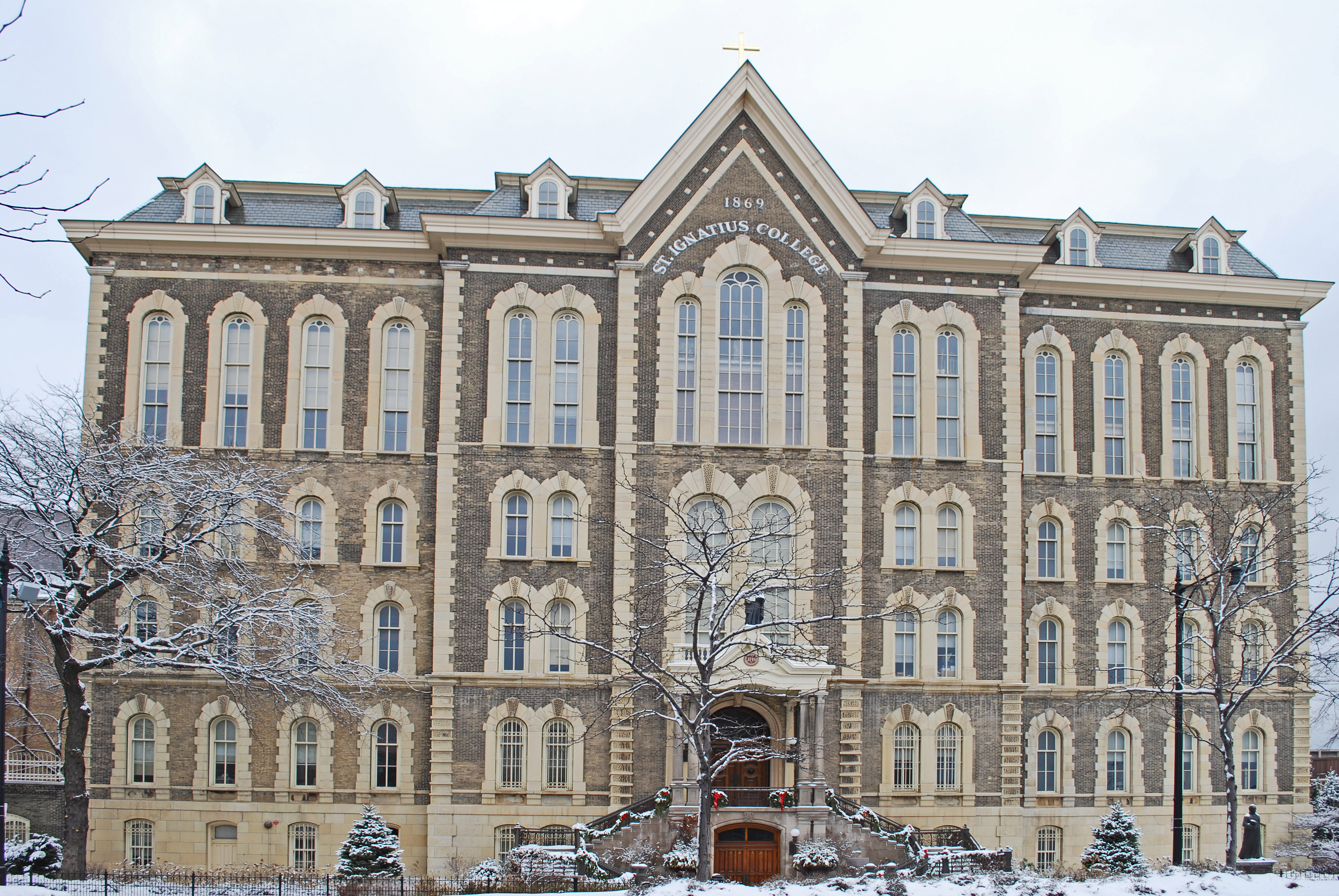
St. Ignatius, Chicago

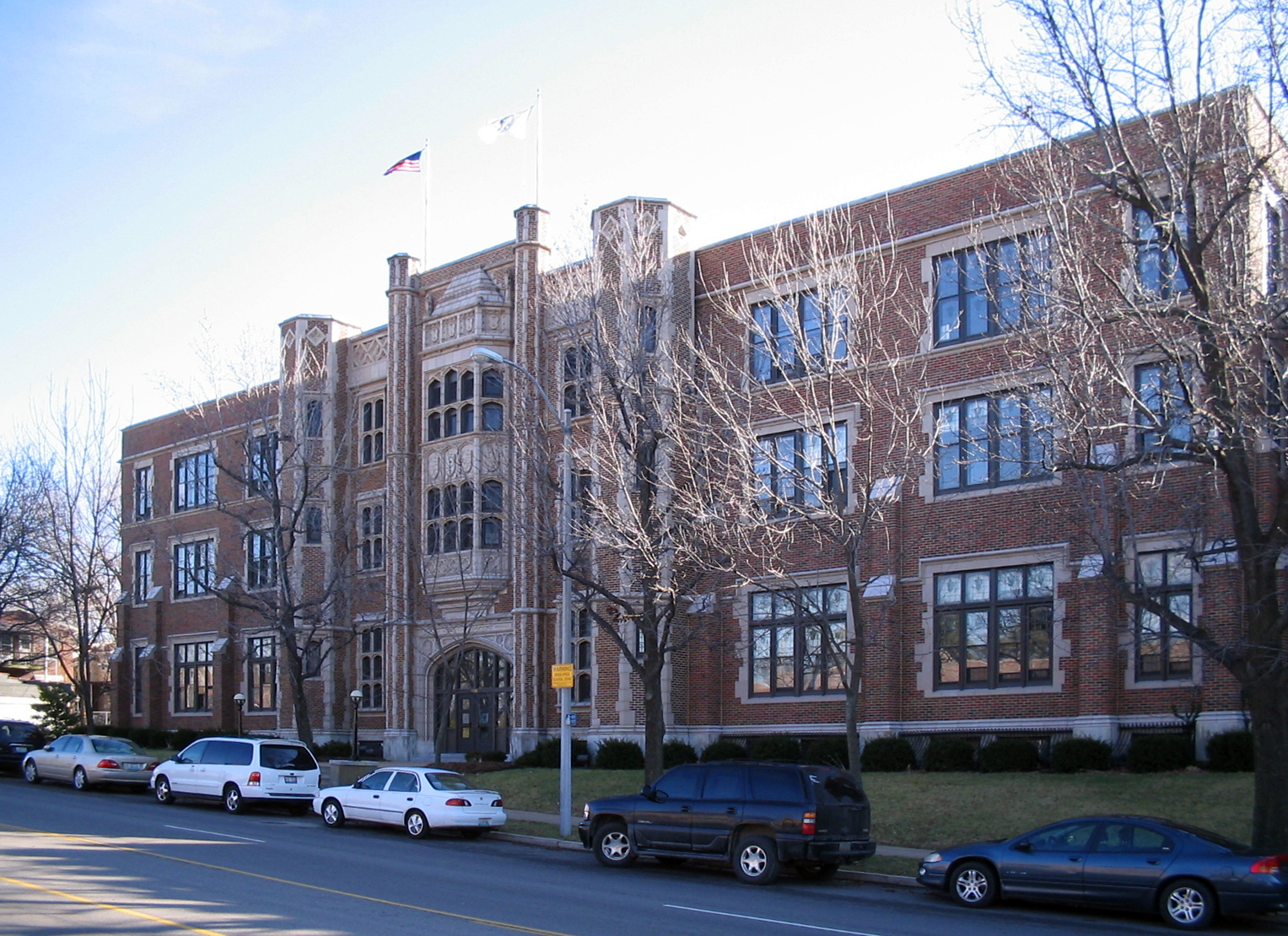
St. Louis U. High

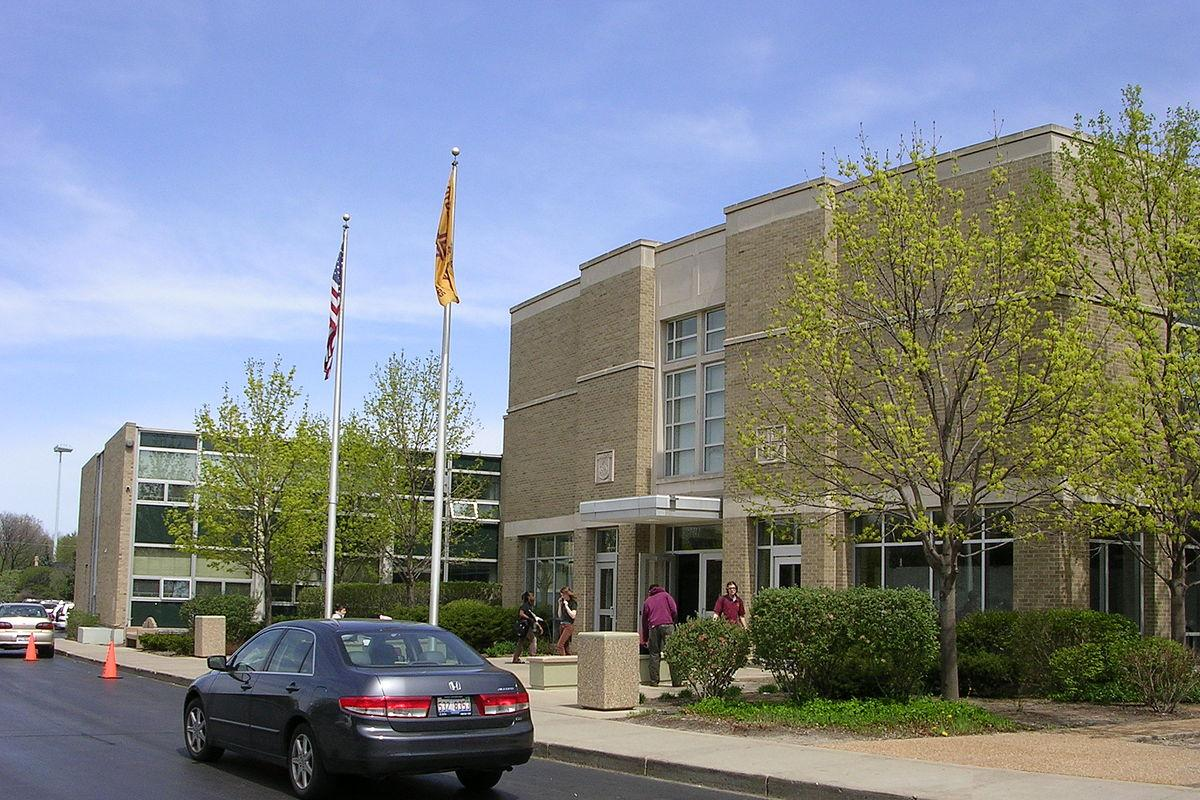
Loyola Academy, Wilmette, Illinois

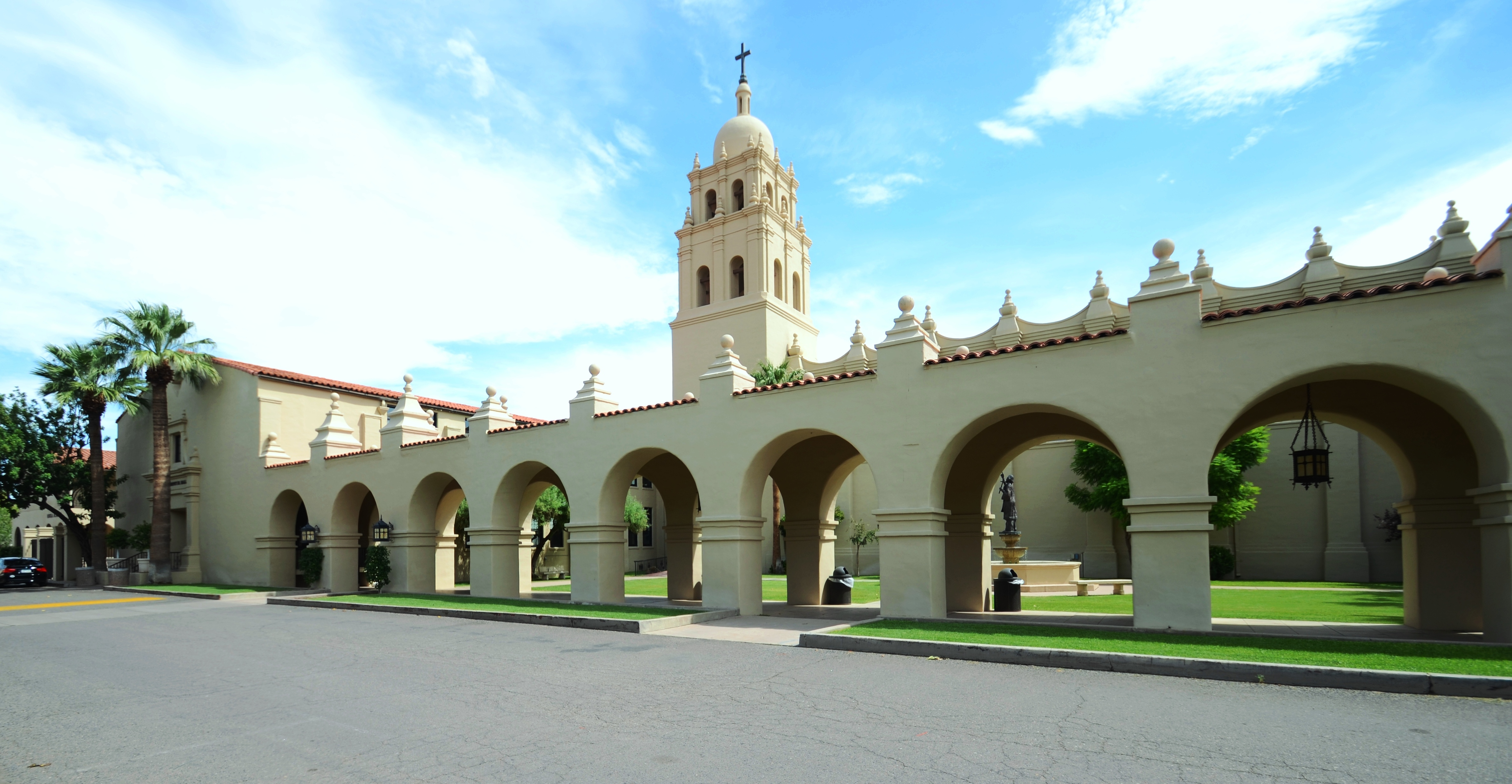
Brophy Prep chapel

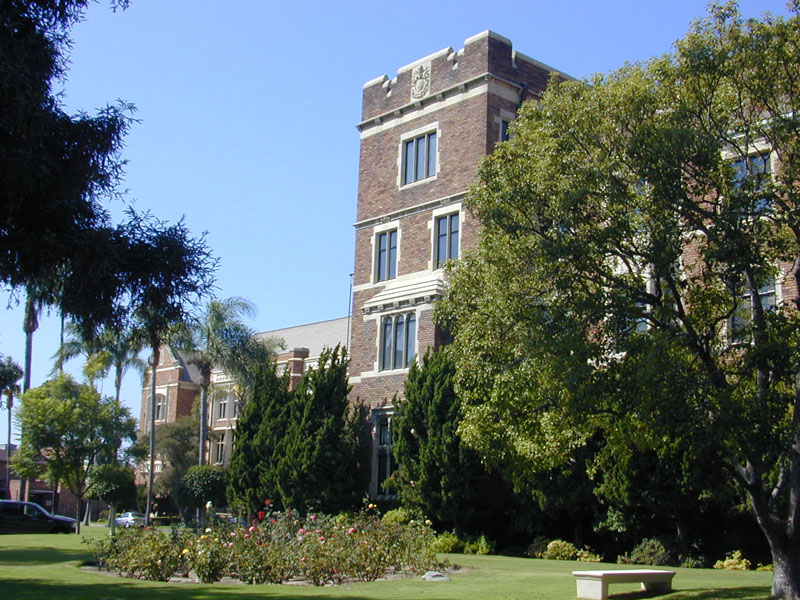
Loyola, Los Angeles

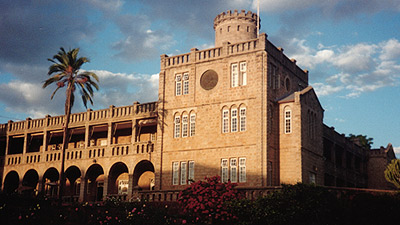
St. George's, Harare

=== Albania ===
- Pjeter Meshkalla High School, Shkoder

=== Angola ===
- Celia Mendez Mbanza-Kongo

=== Argentina ===
- Colegio del Salvador (Argentina), Buenos Aires

=== Australia ===
==== New South Wales ====
- St Aloysius' College, Sydney
- Saint Ignatius' College, Riverview, Sydney

==== South Australia ====
- Saint Ignatius' College, Athelstone, Adelaide

==== Victoria ====
- Saint Ignatius College, Geelong
- Xavier College, Melbourne

=== Austria ===
- Aloysian College, Linz
- Kalksburg College, Vienna

=== Belgium ===
- Collège Matteo Ricci, Brussels
- Collège Notre-Dame de la Paix, Namur
- Collège Saint-Paul (Godinne)
- Collège Saint-Servais (Liège)
- Collège Saint-Stanislas, Mons
- Collège Saint-François-Xavier, Verviers
- John of Ruysbroeck College, Laeken
- Our Lady College, Antwerp
- Sint-Barbaracollege
- St John Berchmans College, Brussels
- St Joseph College, Aalst
- St Joseph College, Turnhout
- St Michael College, Brussels
- Xaverius College

=== Belize ===
- St. John's College, Belize City

=== Bolivia ===
- Colegio del Sagrado Corazón, Sucre
- John XXIII College, Cochabamba
- Colegio San Calixto, La Paz
- Colegio San Ignacio, La Paz

=== Brazil ===
- Anchieta College (New Fribourg), RJ
- Anchieta College (Porto Alegre), RS
- Antonio Vieira College, Salvador, BA
- College of Our Lady Mediatrix, Curitiba, PR
- Diocesan College (Teresina), PI
- FMC Electronic Technical School, Santa Rita do Sapucaí, MG
- Jesuit College, Juiz de Fora, MG
- Loyola College, Belo Horizonte, MG
- Saint Catherine College, Florianópolis, SC
- St. Alphonsus Rodriguez School (ESAR), Teresina, PI
- St. Francis Xavier College, San Paulo, SP
- St. Ignatius College, Fortaleza, CE
- St. Ignatius College, Rio de Janeiro, RJ
- St. Louis College, São Paulo, SP

=== Burundi ===
- Holy Spirit Lycée, Bujumbura

=== Canada ===
- Brebeuf College School, Toronto
- Collège Jean-de-Brébeuf, Montreal
- Loyola High School, Montreal
- St. Bonaventure's College, St. John's City
- St. Paul's High School, Winnipeg
- Collège Saint-Charles-Garnier, Quebec City

=== Chile ===
- St. Francis Xavier College, Puerto Montt
- St. Ignatius College, Alonso Ovalle, Santiago
- St. Ignatius El Bosque, Santiago
- St. Aloysius College, Antofagasta
- St. Matthew College, Osorno

=== Colombia ===
- Berchmans College, Cali
- St. Bartholomew Major College, Bogotá
- Colegio San Bartolomé la Merced, Bogotá
- St. Francis Xavier College, Pasto
- Colegio San Pedro Claver, Bucaramanga
- St. Aloysius College, Manizales
- St. Ignatius Loyola College, Medellin
- St. Joseph College, Barranquilla
- Gimnasio Los Caobos, Bogotá

=== Croatia ===
- Jesuit Classical Gymnasium in Osijek

=== Democratic Republic of Congo ===
- Boboto College, Gombe

=== Ecuador ===
- Christ the King School, Portoviejo
- St. Gabriel College, Quito
- Xavier, Guayaquil
- Borja School, Cuenca

=== Egypt ===
- College de la Sainte Famille, Cairo

=== El Salvador ===
- Externado San José, San Salvador

=== Federated States of Micronesia ===
- Xavier High School, Chuuk

=== France ===
- Lycée la Providence, Amiens
- Lycée privé Sainte-Geneviève, Versailles
- Lycée Saint-Joseph-de-Tivoli
- Lycée Saint-Joseph of Avignon
- Lycée Saint-Louis-de-Gonzague, Paris
- Lycée Saint-Marc, Lyon
- Fénelon - La Trinité School, Lyon
- Provence School, Marseille
- Le Marais Sainte-Thérèse Professional School, Saint-Étienne
- Caousou School, Toulouse
- Saint-Joseph of Reims
- Sainte Marie La Grand’Grange, Saint-Chamond

=== Germany ===
- Aloisiuskolleg (gymnasium), Bonn
- Canisius-Kolleg Berlin (gymnasium), Berlin
- Kolleg St. Blasien (gymnasium), Black Forest
- Sankt-Ansgar-Schule (gymnasium), Hamburg

=== Guatemala ===
- Xavier Lyceum, Guatemala, Guatemala City
- Loyola College Guatemala, Guatemala City

=== Hong Kong ===
- Wah Yan College, Hong Kong
- Wah Yan College, Kowloon

=== Hungary ===
- Fényi Gyula Jesuit High School, Miskolc

=== India ===
==== Andhra Pradesh ====
- Loyola High School, Hindupur
- Loyola High School, KD Peta
- Loyola High School, Vinukonda
- Andhra Loyola College Vijayawada
- Loyola Public School, Loyola Nagar, Guntur
- St. John's High School, Amalapuram
- St. Patrick's High School, Secunderabad
- St. Xavier's High School, Darsi

==== Bihar ====
- St. Michael's High School, Patna
- St. Xavier's High School, Patna
- St. Xavier's Higher Secondary School, Bettiah
- Khrist Raja High School, Bettiah

==== Delhi ====
- St. Xavier's School, Delhi
- St. Xavier's School, Rohini

==== Goa ====
- Loyola High School, Margao
- Saint Britto High School, Mapusa

==== Gujarat ====
- St. Xavier's High School, Mirzapur, Ahmedabad
- St. Xavier's High School, Loyola Hall, Ahmedabad
- St. Xavier's High School, Gandhinagar
- St. Xavier's High School, Surat

==== Jharkhand ====
- De Nobili School, Bhuli, Dhanbad
- De Nobili School, CMRI, Dhanbad
- De Nobili School CTPS, Bokaro, Chandrapura
- De Nobili School, FRI, Digwadih, Dhanbad
- De Nobili School, Koradih
- De Nobili School, Maithon, Dhanbad
- De Nobili School, Mugma, Dhanbad
- De Nobili School, Sindri, Dhanbad
- Loyola Collegiate School, Jamshedpur
- Loyola School, Jamshedpur
- St. John's High School, Ranchi
- St. Xavier's English School, Chakradharpur
- St. Xavier's School, Ranchi
- St. Xavier's School, Bokaro
- St. Xavier's School, Hazaribag

==== Karnataka ====
- St. Aloysius PU College, Harihar
- St. Joseph's Boys High School, Bangalore
- St. Joseph's Indian High School, Bangalore
- St. Joseph's Pre-University College, Bangalore
- St. Joseph's PU College, Anekal
- St. Paul's School, Belgaum
- St. Xavier's PU College, Gulbarga
- Xavier School, Manvi, Raichur

==== Kerala ====
- Loyola School, Thiruvananthapuram
- AKJM Public School, Kanjirappally, Kottayam
- St. Michael’s School, Kannur

==== Madhya Pradesh ====
- Campion School Bhopal, Madhya Pradesh

==== Maharashtra ====
- Campion School, Mumbai
- Dnyanmata Vidyalaya, Sangamner, Ahmednagar
- Holy Family High School, Mumbai
- St. Vincent's High School, Pune
- St. Stanislaus High School, Mumbai
- St. Mary's High School SSC, Mumbai
- St. Mary's School, Mumbai ICSE, Mumbai
- St. Mary's School, Sangamner, Ahmednagar
- St. Xavier's Boys' Academy, Mumbai
- St. Xavier's High School, Fort Fort, Mumbai
- St. Xavier's High School, Manickpur
- St. Xavier's High School, Nashik
- St. Xavier's School, Kolhapur

==== Odisha ====
- Loyola School, Bhubaneswar
- Loyola School, Baripada
- Loyola School, Kalinganagar

==== Rajasthan ====
- St. Xavier's School, Behror
- St. Xavier's School, Jaipur
- St. Xavier's School, Nevta

==== Tamil Nadu ====
- Carmel Higher Secondary School, Nagercoil
- Loyola College, Mettala, Namakkal
- Loyola Academy, Maraimalai Nagar, Chennai
- Loyola Higher Secondary School, Kuppayanallur
- St. Arul Anandar School, Oriyur
- St. Mary's Higher Secondary School, Dindigul
- St. Mary’s Higher Secondary School, Madurai
- St. Xavier's Higher Secondary School, Palayamkottai
- St. Xavier's Higher Secondary School, Thoothukudi
- St. Joseph's College, Tiruchirappalli
- Loyola College, Chennai

==== Telangana ====
- Loyola High School, Karimnagar

==== West Bengal ====
- Loyola High School (Kolkata)
- St. Joseph's School, Darjeeling
- St. Lawrence High School, Kolkata
- St. Xavier's Collegiate School, Kolkata
- St. Xavier's School, Burdwan
- St. Xavier's School, Durgapur
- St. Xavier’s School, Raiganj

=== Indonesia ===
- Canisius College, Jakarta
- Gonzaga College, Jakarta
- Loyola College, Semarang
- PIKA Industrial Woodworking School, Semarang
- De Britto College, Yogyakarta
- Peter Canisius Minor Seminary Mertoyudan, Magelang
- Mikael Professional School, Surakarta
- Le Cocq d'Armandville College, Nabire

=== Ireland ===
- Belvedere College, Dublin
- Clongowes Wood College, County Kildare
- Crescent College Comprehensive, County Limerick
- Gonzaga College, Dublin
- Coláiste Iognáid, Galway

=== Italy ===
- Leo XIII Institute, Milan
- Social Institute, Turin
- Massimiliano Massimo Institute, Rome
- House of the Savior, Naples
- Gonzaga Institute, Palermo
- St. Ignatius College, Messina
- Jesuit College, Messina

=== Jamaica ===
- Campion College, Kingston
- St. George's College, Kingston

=== Japan ===
- Eiko Gakuen, Kamakura
- Hiroshima Academy Junior and Senior High School, Hiroshima
- Rokko Junior and Senior High School, Kobe
- Sophia Fukuoka Junior and Senior High School, Fukuoka

=== Kosovo ===
- Loyola Gymnasium Prizren

=== Lebanon ===
- Collège Notre Dame de Jamhour, Beirut

=== Lithuania ===
- Kaunas Jesuit Gymnasium, Kaunas
- Vilnius Jesuit High School, Vilnius

=== Madagascar ===
- Immaculate Conception College, Mananjary
- Xavier College, Madagascar, Fianarantsoa
- College of Saint Michael, Amparibe, Antananarivo

=== Malta ===
- St Aloysius' College, Birkirkara

=== Mexico ===
- Carlos Pereyra School, Torreon, Coahuila
- Instituto Cultural Tampico, Tampico, Tamaulipas
- Science Institute of Jalisco, Guadalajara

=== Micronesia ===
- Xavier High School, Chuuk, Micronesia
- Yap Catholic High School Rull, Yap, Micronesia

=== Nepal ===
- St. Xavier's School, Godavari
- St. Xavier's School, Jawalakhel

=== Netherlands ===
- St. Stanislaus College, Delft

=== Nicaragua ===
- Colegio Centro América, Managua
- Instituto Loyola, Managua

=== Nigeria ===
- Loyola Jesuit College, Abuja
- St. Francis Catholic Secondary School, Lagos
- Jesuit Memorial College, Port Harcourt
- Gonzaga Jesuit College, Okija Anambra State

=== Panama ===
- Xavier College, Panama

=== Paraguay ===
- Colegio Cristo Rey, Asunción
- Xavier Technical College, Asunción

=== Peru ===
- Cristo Rey College, Tacna
- Colegio de la Inmaculada, Lima
- Colegio San José, Arequipa
- Colegio San Ignacio, Piura

=== Philippines ===
- Ateneo de San Pablo, San Pablo City, Laguna (closed in 1978)
- Ateneo de Iloilo – Santa Maria Catholic School, Iloilo City, Iloilo
- Sacred Heart School – Ateneo de Cebu, Mandaue City, Cebu
- Xavier School San Juan, San Juan, Metro Manila

=== Poland ===
- St. Stanislaus Jesuit High School, Gdynia
- Catholic Academy in Warsaw "Bobolanum", Warsaw

=== Portugal ===
- St. John de Britto College, Lisbon

=== Puerto Rico ===
- Colegio San Ignacio de Loyola

=== Rwanda ===
- St. Ignatius School, Kigali

=== Spain ===
- Claver College, Raimat
- Colegio Casp-Sagrado Corazón de Jesús, Barcelona
- Colegio de la Inmaculada, Gijón
- College of San Jose, Villafranca de los Barros
- College of the Savior, Zaragoza
- College of the Immaculate, Alicante
- Cristo Rey Polytechnic Institute, Valladolid
- Francis Borgia College, Gandia
- Immaculate Heart of Mary College, Portaceli, Sevilla
- Jesus the Worker, Vitoria
- John XXIII School, Bellvitge, Hospitalet de Llobregat
- Kostka College, Barcelona
- Kostka College Santander
- Nazareth College, Alicante
- Our Lady of Begoña College, Bilbao
- Our Lady of Mount Zion College, Palma, Majorca
- Our Lady of Remembrance College, Madrid
- Sacred Heart Jesuit School of Leon
- Sacred Heart School, Logroño
- San Jose College, Durango
- San Jose College, Valladolid
- San Jose Secondary Educational Center, Málaga
- St. Francis Xavier School, Burgos
- St. Ignatius College, Barcelona
- St. Ignatius College, Oviedo
- St. Ignatius College, Pamplona
- St. Ignatius College, San Sebastian
- St. Ignatius of Loyola College, Alcala de Henares
- St. Ignatius of Loyola College, Las Palmas
- St. James the Apostle College, Vigo
- St. Mary of the Sea College, Corunna
- St. Stanislaus Kostka College, Málaga
- St. Stanislaus Kostka College, Salamanca
- Virgin of Guadalupe College, Badajoz
- Vocational Training Centre Revillagigedo, Gijón
- Xavier College, Santiago de Compostela
- Xavier College, Tudela

=== Sri Lanka ===
- St. Aloysius' College, Galle
- St. Servatius' College, Matara

=== Tanzania ===
- Loyola School, Dar es Salaam
- St. Peter Claver High School, Dodoma

=== Timor-Leste ===
- St. Ignatius of Loyola College (Colegio de Santo Inasio de Loiola – CSIL), Kasait, Ulmera, Liquiça, Timor-Leste

=== Uganda ===
- Ocer Campion Jesuit College, Gulu in Awich village

=== United Kingdom ===
==== England ====
- Barlborough Hall School, Barlborough, Chesterfield, Derbyshire
- Donhead Preparatory School, London
- Mount St Mary's College, Spinkhill, Derbyshire
- St Ignatius' College, Enfield
- St Joseph's School, Hurst Green
- Stonyhurst College, Lancashire
- Stonyhurst Saint Mary's Hall
- Wimbledon College, London

==== Scotland ====
- St Aloysius College, Glasgow
- St Aloysius' College Junior School, Glasgow

=== United States ===
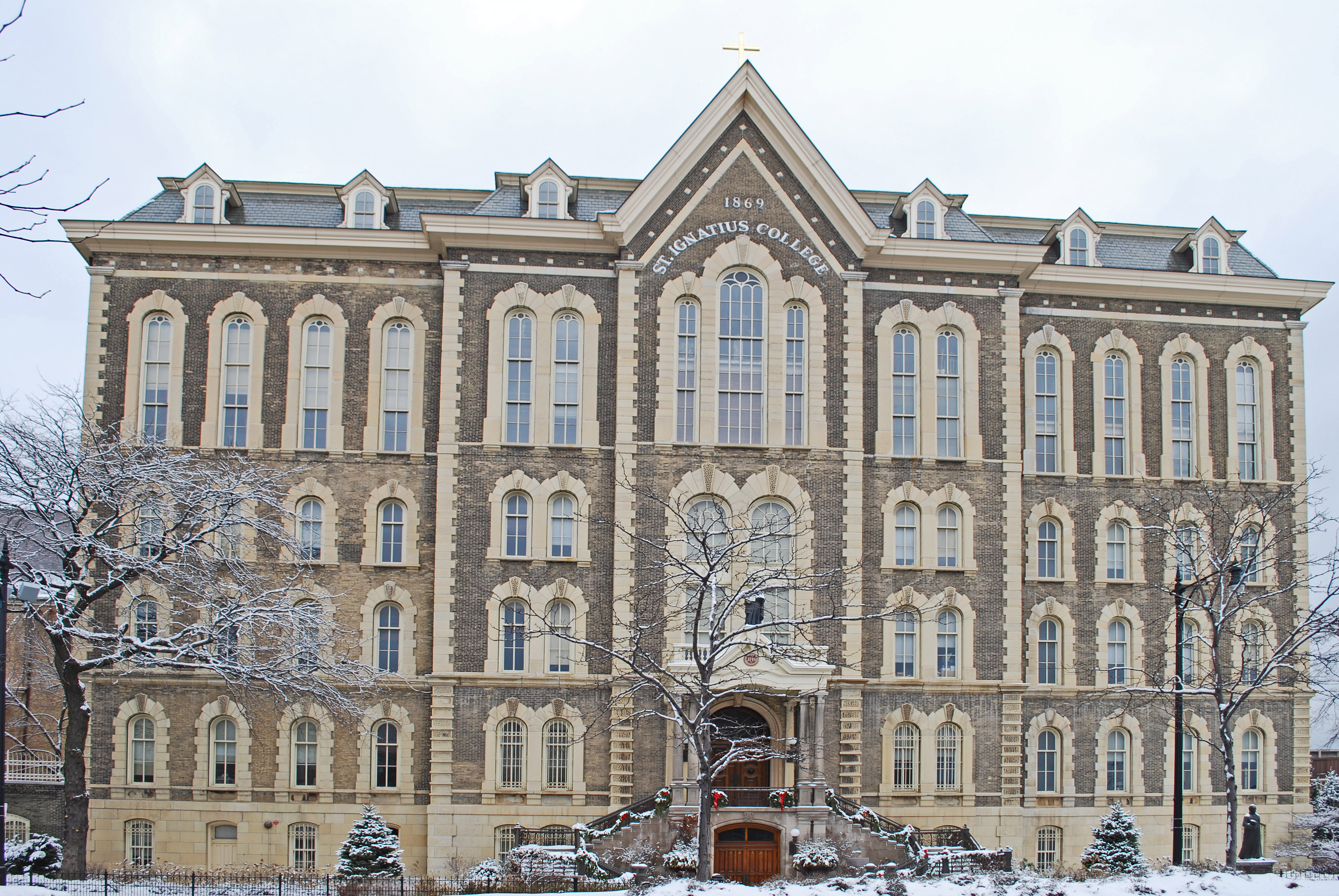
St. Ignatius College Prep, Chicago

- Arrupe Jesuit High School, Denver, Colorado
- Belen Jesuit Preparatory School, Miami, Florida
- Bellarmine College Preparatory, San Jose, California
- Bellarmine Preparatory School, Tacoma, Washington
- Boston College High School, Boston, Massachusetts
- Brebeuf Jesuit Preparatory School, Indianapolis, Indiana
- Brophy College Preparatory, Phoenix, Arizona
- Canisius High School, Buffalo, New York
- Cheverus High School, Portland, Maine
- Christ the King Jesuit College Prep High School, Chicago, Illinois The Cranwell School, Lenox, Mass closed in 1976
- Creighton Preparatory School, Omaha, Nebraska
- Cristo Rey Atlanta Jesuit High School, Atlanta, Georgia
- Cristo Rey High School, Sacramento, California, with other congregations
- Cristo Rey Jesuit College Preparatory of Houston, Houston, Texas
- Cristo Rey Jesuit High School, Baltimore, Maryland
- Cristo Rey Jesuit High School, Chicago, Illinois
- Cristo Rey Jesuit High School Milwaukee, Milwaukee, Wisconsin
- Cristo Rey Jesuit High School, Minneapolis, Minnesota
- Cristo Rey New York High School, New York City, with other congregations
- Cristo Rey San José Jesuit High School, San Jose, California
- DeSmet Jesuit High School, St. Louis, Missouri
- Fairfield College Preparatory School, Fairfield, Connecticut
- Fordham Preparatory School, Bronx, New York
- Georgetown Preparatory School, Bethesda, Maryland
- Gonzaga College High School, Washington, D.C.
- Gonzaga Preparatory School, Spokane, Washington
- Jesuit College Preparatory School, Dallas, Texas
- Jesuit High School, Beaverton, Oregon
- Jesuit High School, New Orleans, Louisiana
- Jesuit High School, Sacramento, California
- Jesuit High School, Tampa, Florida
- Loyola Academy, Wilmette, Illinois
- Loyola Blakefield, Towson, Maryland
- Loyola High School, Detroit, Michigan
- Loyola High School, Los Angeles, California
- Loyola School, New York City
- Marquette University High School, Milwaukee, Wisconsin
- McQuaid Jesuit High School, Rochester, New York
- Red Cloud High School, Pine Ridge, South Dakota
- Regis High School, New York City
- Regis Jesuit High School, Aurora, Colorado
- Rockhurst High School, Kansas City, Missouri
- Scranton Preparatory School, Scranton, Pennsylvania
- St. Ignatius College Prep, Chicago, Illinois
- St. Ignatius College Preparatory, San Francisco, California
- St. Ignatius High School, Cleveland
- St. John's Jesuit High School and Academy, Toledo, Ohio
- Saint Joseph's Preparatory School, Philadelphia, Pennsylvania
- St. Louis University High School, St. Louis, Missouri
- St. Martin de Porres High School, Cleveland, Ohio
- St. Peter's Preparatory School, Jersey City, New Jersey
- St. Xavier High School, Cincinnati, Ohio
- Seattle Preparatory School, Seattle, Washington
- Strake Jesuit College Preparatory, Houston, Texas
- University of Detroit High School & Academy, Detroit, Michigan
- Verbum Dei High School, Los Angeles, California, Archdiocesan administered by Jesuits
- Walsh Jesuit High School, Cuyahoga Falls, Ohio
- Xavier College Preparatory, Palm Desert, California, Jesuit endorsed
- Xavier High School, New York City

=== Venezuela ===
- Gonzaga College, Venezuela, Maracaibo
- Loyola College Gumilla, Puerto Ordaz
- St. Ignatius of Loyola College, Caracas
- Catholic University of Tachira, San Cristobal

=== Zimbabwe ===
- Makumbi Visitation High School, Makumbi Mission
- Saint Ignatius College, Chishawasha, Harare
- St George's College, Harare
- St. Paul's High School, Musami
- St. Peter's Kubatana, Glen Norah, Harare
- St. Rupert Mayer's High School, Makonde

== List of defunct Jesuit secondary schools ==
=== Austria ===
- Stella Matutina, Feldkirch, 1651–1979

=== East Timor, Indonesia ===
- St Joseph High School, Dili (between 1993-2011)

=== Iraq ===
- Baghdad College, Baghdad (nationalized 1969)

=== Mexico ===
- San Ildefonso College, Mexico City (1588–1767)

=== Netherlands ===
Still operating but no longer Jesuit:

- Aloysius College, The Hague
- Canisius College, Nijmegen
- Ignatius Gymnasium, Amsterdam
- Catholic Comprehensive School, Breul, Zeist
- Maartenscollege, Groningen
- Bonaventure College, Leiden

=== Romania ===
- Jesuit College of Sibiu, closed in 1773

=== United States ===
- Brooklyn Preparatory School, New York City, closed in 1972
- Campion High School, Prairie du Chien, Wisconsin, closed in 1975
- Bishop Connolly High School, Fall River, Massachusetts, closed in 2023

== See also ==
- List of alumni of Jesuit educational institutions
- List of schools named after Francis Xavier
- List of Jesuit sites
