= Loyola College Guatemala =

Location
- 12 Avenida 4-30, Zona 1 Guatemala City; Guatemala
- Coordinates: 14°38′35″N 90°30′25″W

Information
- Type: Private primary and secondary school
- Religious affiliation: Catholicism
- Denomination: Jesuits
- Patron saint: Ignatius Loyola
- Established: 1958; 68 years ago
- Director: Orlando Aguilar
- Grades: Pre-K-12
- Gender: Co-educational
- Enrollment: 1,146
- Website: www.colegioloyola.edu.gt

Loyola College Guatemala is a private Catholic pre-school, primary and secondary school, located in Guatemala City, Guatemala. The Jesuit-run school traces its origins to 1958 at the elementary school at La Merced Catholic church.

== History ==
Loyola College remains on 12th Avenue near 5th Street. In 1965 the preprimary opened and in 1968 the high school. In 1971 the primary added an afternoon session and the pre-primary moved to 12th Avenue 3-69 Zone 1. In 1972 an afternoon session opened for pre-primary. By the 1980s there were over 2,000 students at all three levels.

The College has received three government awards: Order José Rolz Bennet the Municipality of Guatemala and the Order of Quetzal granted by the Government of Guatemala both in 2007, and in 2008 the Pedagogical Order Juan Jose Arevalo granted by the Ministry of Education.

== Directors ==
The following individuals have served as Directors of the school:

- Isidro Iriarte, 1958
- José María Rodríguez, 1959-1960
- Mario P. L. Martinez, 1961-1968
- Benigno P. Fernandez, 1969
- Nicholas P. Alvarenga, 1969-1988
- Jesus Navascués, 1988-1992
- Ildefonso P. Guyon, 1993-2000
- Laurentino P. Peña, 2001-2006
- PW Lange Ignacio Cruz, 2007-2010
- Alfredo Maria Florez, 2010-2012
- Licda. Karen Avendaño, 2013
- Jaime Parra, 2014-2016
- Orlando Aguilar 2016 present

== See also ==
- Education in Guatemala
- List of Jesuit schools
