= Loyola College Gumilla =

Location
- Puerto Ordaz, Ciudad Guayana; Venezuela
- Coordinates: 8°17′58.71″N 62°42′41.41″W

Information
- Type: Jesuit, Catholic
- Motto: En todo amar y servir In everything to love and serve
- Established: 1965; 61 years ago
- Rector: Luis Ovando Hernandez.
- Director: Miguel Centeno.
- Grades: K through 12
- Gender: Coeducational
- Enrollment: 1500
- Website: loyolagumilla.com.ve

Loyola College Gumilla is a coeducational school, primary through high school, founded by the Jesuits in 1965 in Puerto Ordaz, Ciudad Guayana, Bolivar State, Venezuela.

== History ==
Loyola College Gumilla was opened by the Jesuits in 1965. In 1968 it moved to its present location and was given its present name. Since 1980 Loyola Gumilla has been coeducational from kindergarten. In 1978 the night school was added. By 1989 there were 1,727 students. The nuns of Cristo Rey withdrew from the College in 1980.

== See also ==
- List of Jesuit schools
