= St. Ignatius School, Kigali =

Location
- Kigali; Rwanda; 1°56′9″S 30°7′7″E

Information
- Type: Private primary and secondary school
- Religious affiliation: Catholicism
- Denomination: Jesuits
- Patron saint: Ignatius Loyola
- Established: 2006; 20 years ago
- Headmaster: Olivier Kayitare
- Grades: K-12
- Gender: Coeducational
- Website: www.thegrace-foundation.org/st-ignatius-school

St. Ignatius School, Rwanda, is a private Catholic primary and secondary school located in Kigali, the capital city of Rwanda. The school was founded by the Society of Jesus in 2006. It is coeducational and includes kindergarten through high school. The school relies heavily on funds from abroad, with a major benefactor being the Grace Foundation which was founded to support Jesuit schools in Rwanda.

In 2015, St. Ignatius School was ranked second in the nation based on the performance on the National Exam.

In 2026 it produced the countries 2nd best Ordinary Level National Examination scorer GANZA Joel with 98.6%.

== See also ==
- Education in Rwanda
- List of Jesuit schools
