= St. Peter Claver High School =

Location
- Dodoma; Tanzania
- Coordinates: 6°9′16″S 35°51′13″E

Information
- Type: Private secondary boarding school
- Motto: To learn, to love, to serve
- Religious affiliation: Catholicism
- Denomination: Jesuit
- Established: 2011; 15 years ago
- Director: James Joseph
- Headmaster: Buberwa Karongo
- Grades: 60-65
- Gender: Co-educational
- Colors: Blue and black
- Mascot: Lion
- Nickname: Claverians
- National ranking: 85
- Yearbook: Claverian Magazine
- Website: www.stpeterclaver.ac.tz

St. Peter Claver High School is a private Catholic secondary boarding school, located approximately 15 kilometres (9.3 mi) from the centre of Dodoma, the national capital of the United Republic of Tanzania. The school was founded by the Society of Jesus in 2011 and is situated on a 200-hectare (500-acre) campus.
