= Claver College, Raimat =

Coordinates: 41°41′3.82″N 0°29′57″E

- Raimat, Lleida, Catalonia, Spain

Information
- Type: Jesuit, Catholic
- Denomination: All faiths
- Established: 1970; 56 years ago
- Director: Javier Puyol Pallas
- Grades: Ages three through eighteen
- Gender: Coeducational
- Website: Claver College

Claver College, Raimat, Lleida, was founded by the Society of Jesus in 1970, and educates ages 3 through 18.

== See also ==
- List of Jesuit sites
