= Sacred Heart Jesuit School of Leon =

Coordinates: 42°36′55.84″N 5°33′40.2″W

- Colegio del Sagrado Corazón
- Calle de los Jesuitas, León, Spain

Information
- Type: Jesuit, Catholic
- Denomination: All faiths
- Established: 1959; 67 years ago
- Grades: Ages 3 through 18
- Gender: Coeducational
- Enrollment: 1,100
- Publication: Ventanal
- Predecessor: Carrión de los Condes (Palencia, 1854)
- Website: Sacred Heart Jesuit School of Leon

Sacred Heart Jesuit School of Leon is a Spanish school. It began as a minor seminary for Jesuits in 1959, and progressed to being a day-school for all students, ages 3 to 18, with government support.

== History ==
Sacred Heart Jesuit School of León, Spain, began in 1959 with the transfer of 197 students and 38 Jesuits from the Jesuit minor seminary in Carrión de los Condes (Palencia).

In 1957 the Jesuits had acquired a farm to start a minor seminary with boarding facilities for those aspiring to be Jesuits. The early program consisted in six years of study for the baccalaureate. There were facilities for 270 boarding students along with 200 day students, not seminarians, who began arriving in 1960. By 1973 the school ceased to be a minor seminary and became only a college for externs, with 811 in attendance. In 1974 lay teachers (21) now outnumbered the Jesuits (19). In 1975 the school began receiving financial assistance from the State and was opened to all. In 1976 the boarding school was closed and enrolment stood at 1037. In 1980 the school became coeducational, beginning at the pre-primary level; enrolment was 1432. In 2011 the school received its first non-Jesuit director. In 2013 enrolment stood at 1097.

The College also organises community courses on issues like personal money management.

== See also ==
- List of Jesuit sites
