= John XXIII School, Bellvitge =

Coordinates: 41°20′59.43″N 2°6′27.56″E

- Centre d'Estudis Joan XXIII
- L'Hospitalet de Llobregat, Catalonia, Spain

Information
- Type: Jesuit, Catholic
- Established: 1968; 58 years ago
- Director: Núria Gonzalo Piguillem
- Staff: 155 teachers
- Grades: K through 12
- Gender: Coeducational
- Enrollment: 1,600
- Website: John XXIII School, Bellvitge

John XXIII School, Bellvitge District of the city of L'Hospitalet de Llobregat is in Catalonia, Spain. It is coeducational, from kindergarten through secondary school, including professional and trades courses, and has been administered by the Society of Jesus since its founding in 1968.

In 1968, the Centre of Studies Joan XXIII began with 15 kindergarten children and a draftsman with 12 students. In 2016 the distribution of students was: infant 154, primary 313, secondary 443, baccalaureate 168, vocational certification programs 391, vocational non-certification programs 229 students. The government assists by paying teachers' salaries. John XXIII has addressed the practical needs of the surrounding area, and its awards include the Spanish Government Education Prize in 2006 and the Economy Circle Prize in 2010 for achieving a 20% higher graduation rate than the Catalan average.

== Academics ==
The Baccalaureate is offered both in Science and Technology and in Humanities and Social Sciences.

== See also ==
- List of Jesuit sites
