= St. Stanislaus Jesuit Secondary School in Gdynia =

Coordinates: 54°30′56.35″N 18°31′31.44″E

St. Stanislaus Jesuit High School, Gdynia
- Zespół Szkół Jezuitów im. św. Stanisława Kostki w Gdyni
- ul. Tatrzańska 35 81-313 Gdynia, Pomeranian Voivodeship, Poland

Information
- Type: Private Catholic Coeducational secondary education institution
- Patron saint: St. Stanislaus Kostka
- Established: 1937; 89 years ago
- Director: Stanislaus Twarowski
- Principal: Grzegorz Wojnowski
- Publication: CooLjo
- Website: St. Stanislaus Jesuit High School

St. Stanislaus Jesuit High School, Gdynia, Poland is a private, Catholic coeducational secondary education institution run by the Society of Jesus in Gdynia Pomeranian Voivodeship, Poland. It was opened by the Jesuits in 1937.

== History ==
St. Stanislaus Jesuit High School was established in 1937 at the Orlowo district of Gdynia Pomeranian, Poland. It was shut down during World War II and after the war by the Polish Government. it opened at its present location in 1994.

== See also ==
- List of Jesuit sites
