= San Jose Secondary Educational Center =

Coordinates: 36°43′13.91″N 4°26′37.52″W

- Carranque, Málaga, Spain

Information
- Type: Jesuit, Catholic
- Motto: We are sewing the future.
- Established: 1906; 120 years ago
- Grades: Ages 3 through 18
- Gender: Coeducational
- Enrollment: 1,600
- Website: SanJoseMalaga

San Jose Secondary Educational Center, Málaga, Spain, was founded by the Society of Jesus in 1906. It offers education for infant through baccalaureate and initial professional qualification with various training cycles in both middle and high school.

== History ==
In 1995 the school was renamed San José Secondary Education Center with definitive approval to impart Compulsory Secondary Education and the Baccalaureate. In 1997 final authorization was given to impart Middle and Higher Education Training Cycles. In 1998 the Center became a part of the Loyola Andalusia and Canary Islands Foundation.

In 2011 the City of Málaga awarded its Gold Medal to the center and posthumously the title Adoptive Son of the city to Padre Mondéjar. Infant education from age three was instituted in 2014.

== See also ==
- List of Jesuit sites
