= Vocational Training Centre Revillagigedo =

Jesuits school in Gijón, Spain

Coordinates: 43°32′25.65″N 5°40′44.82″W

- Motto: Ad Majorem Dei Gloriam
- Motto in English: For the Greater Glory of God
- Established: 1929; 97 years ago
- Religious affiliation: Roman Catholic (Jesuit)
- Location: Mariano Pola, 46, Gijón, Asturias, Spain
- Nickname: Gedo
- Website: www.revillagigedo.es

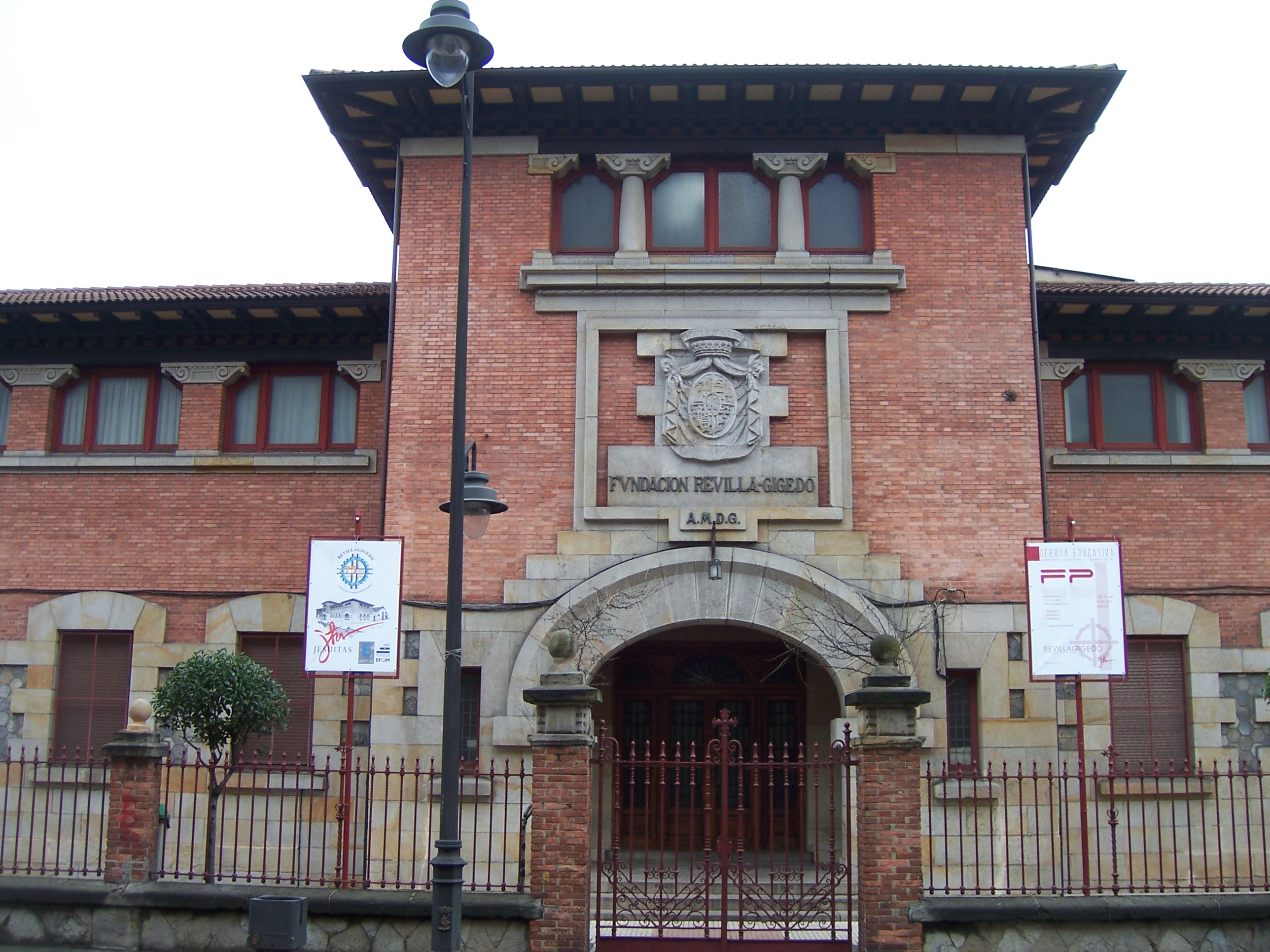

Vocational Training Centre Revillagigedo is a work of the Jesuits in Gijón, Asturias, Spain. Early through higher grade vocational training courses are offered following the regulations for vocational training in Spain.

== See also ==
- List of Jesuit sites
