= List of schools named after Francis Xavier =

A multitude of schools and universities have been named after St. Francis Xavier, a Spanish Roman Catholic saint and co-founder of the Society of Jesus. This page lists notable educational institutions named after St. Xavier, arranged by country and region. Many of these schools are run by the Jesuit order (Society of Jesus), while some are operated by the Xaverian Brothers and various dioceses.

== Australia ==
=== Australian Capital Territory ===
- St. Francis Xavier College, Canberra

=== Queensland ===
- St Francis Xavier Primary School, Gold Coast

=== New South Wales ===
- St Francis Xavier's College, Hamilton
- Xavier Catholic College, Albury
- Xavier Catholic College, Ballina
- Xavier Catholic College, Llandilo, Penrith

=== South Australia ===
- Xavier College, Adelaide, Gawler Belt

=== Victoria ===
- Xavier College, Kew, Melbourne
- St. Francis Xavier College, Beaconsfield, Berwick, Officer

== Bangladesh ==
- St Francis Xavier's Green Herald International School, Mohammadpur, Dhaka

== Belgium ==
- Collège Saint-François-Xavier (SFXun), Verviers, Walloon
- Xaverius College, Borgerhout, Antwerp, Flanders

== Brazil ==
- Colégio São Francisco Xavier, Ipiranga, São Paulo
- Colégio São Francisco Xavier, Maringá, Paraná

== Cambodia ==
- Xavier Jesuit School, Banteay Meanchey province, Cambodia

== Canada ==
=== Alberta ===
- St. Francis Xavier High School, Edmonton

=== British Columbia ===
- St. Francis Xavier School, Vancouver

=== Newfoundland & Labrador ===
- Xavier Junior High School, Deer Lake

=== Nova Scotia ===
- St. Francis Xavier University, Antigonish

=== Ontario ===
- St. Francis Xavier Catholic High School, Clarence-Rockland
- St. Francis Xavier Catholic High School, Ottawa
- St. Francis Xavier Catholic Secondary School, Milton
- St. Francis Xavier Secondary School, Mississauga

== Chile ==
- Colegio San Francisco Javier, Puerto Montt, Los Lagos

== Colombia ==
- Colegio San Francisco Javier, Pasto, Nariño
- Pontifical Xavierian University, Bogotá, Distrito Capital
- Pontifical Xavierian University, Cali, Valle del Cauca

== Ecuador ==
- Colegio Javier, Guayaquil, Guayas

== Guatemala ==
- Colegio Liceo Javier

== Hong Kong ==
- St. Francis Xavier's College, Tai Kok Tsui, Tai Kok Tsui, Kowloon
- St. Francis Xavier's School, Tsuen Wan, Tsuen Wan, New Territories

== India ==
=== Andhra Pradesh ===
- St. Xavier's Elementary and High School (E.M. and T.M.), Xavier Nagar, Eluru, West Godavari District
- St. Xavier's High School, Darsi
- St. Xavier's High School, Madannapet, Hyderabad

=== Assam ===
- St. Xavier's Public School, Sonai, Silchar
- St. Xavier's School, Doom Dooma, Rupai Siding
- St. Xavier's School, Duliajan
- St. Xavier's School, Naharkatia

=== Bihar ===
- St. Francis Xavier's Academy, Muzaffarpur
- St. Xavier's College of Education, Patna
- St. Xavier's High School, Amba
- St. Xavier's High School, Anwari, Mohania
- St. Xavier's High School, Aurangabad
- St. Xavier's High School, Biswan
- St. Xavier's High School, Chakia
- St. Xavier's High School, Gopalganj
- St. Xavier's High School, Hajipur
- St. Xavier's High School, Lalganj
- St. Xavier's High School, Mahua
- St. Xavier's High School, Motihari
- St. Xavier's High School, Narkatiyaganj
- St. Xavier's High School, Patna
- St. Xavier's High School, Ranti, Madhubani
- St. Xavier's High School, Shahpur Patori
- St. Xavier's High School, Shambhupatti, Samastipur
- St. Xavier's High School, Supaul
- St. Xavier's Public School, Naugachhia
- St. Xavier's Public School, Rupouli
- St. Xavier's High School, Tirbirwa
- St. Xavier's High School, Vishwanathnagar Park, Begusarai
- St. Xavier's Higher Secondary School, Bettiah
- St. Xavier's International School, Muzaffarpur
- St. Xavier's Jr/Sr School, Muzaffarpur
- St. Xavier's Public School, Bhagalpur
- St. Xavier's Public School, Darbhanga
- St. Xavier's Public School, Forbesganj
- St. Xavier's Public School, Purnea
- St. Xavier's Public School, Araria
- St. Xavier's Public School, Sonpur, Chhapra
- St. Xavier's Public School, Gaya

=== Delhi ===
- St. Xavier's School, Civil Lines
- St. Xavier's School, Rohini

=== Goa ===
- St. Xavier's College, Mapusa, Goa
- St. Xavier's High School, Velim

=== Gujarat ===
- St. Xavier's, Adipur
- St. Xavier's High School, Bhuj
- St. Xavier's High School, Gandhinagar
- St. Xavier's High School, Jamnagar
- St. Xavier's High School, Loyola Hall, Ahmedabad
- St. Xavier's High School, Mirzapur, Ahmedabad
- St. Xavier's High School, Surat
- St. Xavier's College, Ahmedabad
- St. Xavier's School, Umreth
- St. Xavier's High School, Nivalda, Dediapada
- St. Xavier's English medium school, Nani Singloti, Dediapada
- St. Xavier's High School, Relva
- St. Xavier's High School, Umarpada

=== Haryana ===
- St. Xavier's Public School, Kalanwali, Dist- Sirsa, Haryana, India
- St. Xavier's Public School, Bhuna Road, Fatehabad, Haryana, India
- St. Xavier's Public School, Ratia, Dist-Fatehabad, Haryana, India
- St. Xavier's High School, Panchkula

=== Jharkhand ===
- Xavier Labour Relations Institute, now the XLRI School of Business and Human Resources, Jamshedpur
- St. Xavier's College, Ranchi
- St. Xavier's College, Simdega
- St. Xavier's English School, Chakradharpur
- St. Xavier's English School and Junior College, Chaibasa
- St. Xavier's Inter College, Lupungutu, Chaibasa
- St. Xavier's Boys School, Chaibasa
- St. Xavier's Girls School , Chaibasa
- St. Xavier's High School, Gadi Tundi, Dhanbad
- St. Xavier's School, Bokaro
- St. Xavier's School, Ranchi
- St. Xavier's, Hazaribagh
- St. Xavier's Public School, Asansol
- St. Xavier's Public School, Ranchi
- St. Xavier's School, Sahibganj
- Xavier Institute of Social Service, Ranchi

=== Karnataka ===
- St. Francis Xavier Girls' High School, Fraser Town, Bangalore
- St. Xavier's College, Bangalore
- St. Xavier's Boys High School, Shivajinagar, Bangalore
- St. Xavier's School, Belgaum
- Xavier Institute of Management and Entrepreneurship, Electronics City, Bangalore

=== Madhya Pradesh ===
- St. Xavier's Sr. Sec. Co-Ed School, Awadhpuri, Bhopal

=== Maharashtra ===
- St. Francis Xavier’s High School, Kanjurmarg, Mumbai
- St. Xavier's High School, Aurangabad
- St. Xavier's College, Mumbai
- St. Xavier's High School, Andheri, Mumbai
- St. Xavier High School, Bhayander, Mumbai
- St. Xavier's Boys Academy, Churchgate, Mumbai
- St. Xavier's High School, Borivli, Mumbai
- St. Xavier's High School, Fort, Mumbai
- St. Xavier's High School, Georai
- St. Xavier's High School, Manickpur
- St. Xavier's High School, Mira Road
- St. Xavier's High School, Nagpur
- St. Xavier's High School, Naigaon, Mumbai
- St. Xavier's High School, Nashik
- St. Xavier's High School, Nerul
- St. Xavier's High School, Panchgani
- St. Xavier's Public School, Nagpur
- St. Xavier's High School, Thane
- St. Xavier's High School, Vile Parle West, Mumbai
- St. Xavier's School, Kolhapur
- St. Xavier's High School, Virar
- St. Xavier's School, Gondia
- St Xavier's Technical Institute, Mahim, Mumbai
- Xavier Institute of Engineering, Mahim
- St. Xavier's School, Pune

=== Odisha ===
- St. Xavier High School, Balipada, Baranga, Bhubaneswar
- St. Xavier High School, Bisiapada, Aragul, Jatani
- St. Xavier High School, Gadakana, Bhubaneswar
- St. Xavier High School, Khirkona, Simulia, Balasore
- St. Xavier High School, Baripada
- St. Xavier's High School, Ambapua, Berhampur
- St. Xavier's High School, Cuttack
- St. Xavier's High School, Kedargouri, Bhubaneswar
- St. Xavier's High School, Khandagiri, Bhubaneswar
- St. Xavier's High School, Patia, Bhubaneswar
- St. Xavier's High School, Satya Nagar, Bhubaneswar
- St. Xavier's Model School, Cuttack
- St. Xavier's Public School, Angul
- St. Xavier's Public School, Bahalda
- St. Xavier's Public School, Baisinga
- St. Xavier's Public School, Balakati
- St. Xavier's Public School, Balia
- St. Xavier's Public School, Basudevpur
- St. Xavier's Public School, Bhawanipatna
- St. Xavier's Public School, Bhograi
- St. Xavier's Public School, Bhuban
- St. Xavier's Public School, Kedargouri Vihar, Bhubaneswar-I
- St. Xavier's Public School, Bhoumanagar, Bhubaneswar-II
- St. Xavier's Public School, Binka
- St. Xavier's Public School, Bolangir
- St. Xavier's Public School, Bonai
- St. Xavier's Public School, Boudh
- St. Xavier's Public School, Chatrapur
- St. Xavier's Public School, Cuttack
- St. Xavier's Public School, Cuttack-II
- St. Xavier's Public School, Delang
- St. Xavier's Public School, Dhalapathar
- St. Xavier's Public School, Dharmagad
- St. Xavier's Public School, Dhenkanal
- St. Xavier's Public School, Digapahandi (Franchisee withdrawn)
- St. Xavier's Public School, Dukura
- St. Xavier's Public School, Gopalpur
- St. Xavier's Public School, Gunupur
- St. Xavier's Public School, Hindol
- St. Xavier's Public School, Jaroli
- St. Xavier's Public School, Joda
- St. Xavier's Public School, Kandhal
- St. Xavier's Public School, Karanjia
- St. Xavier's Public School, Konark
- St. Xavier's Public School, Kullada
- St. Xavier's Public School, Kumarbandh
- St. Xavier's Public School, Madaranga
- St. Xavier's Public School, Maneswar
- St. Xavier's Public School, Narsinghpur
- St. Xavier's Public School, Padampur
- St. Xavier's Public School, Padmanavpur
- St. Xavier's Public School, Pandua
- St. Xavier's Public School, Parjang
- St. Xavier's Public School, Patapur
- St. Xavier's Public School, Pattamundai
- St. Xavier's Public School, Puruna katak
- St. Xavier's Public School, Raisuan
- St. Xavier's Public School, Remuna
- St. Xavier's Public School, Rengali
- St. Xavier's Public School, Birsa, Rourkela
- St. Xavier's Public School, Sainkul
- St. Xavier's Public School, Singhpur
- St. Xavier's Public School, Sundergarh
- St. Xavier's Public School, Swampatna
- St. Xavier's Public School, Titilagarh
- Xaverian High School, Bhubaneswar
- Xavier Institute of Management, Bhubaneswar
- St. Xavier's Public School, Champua
- St. Xavier's Public School, Baitarani Road
- St. Xavier's Public School, Konisi, Ganjam.
- St. Xavier's Public School, Dunguripali
- St. Xavier's Public School, Dakhinapur, Ganjam
- St. Xavier's Public School, Siminai, Dhenkanal

=== Punjab ===
- St. Xavier's High School, Mohali
- St. Xavier's High School, Rampura Phul, Bathinda
- St. Xavier K. G Block (Lkg-3rd) School, Bathinda
- St. Xavier's International School, Patiala
- St. Xavier's Public School, Budhlada
- St. Xavier's Public School, Mandi-Dabwali
- St. Xavier's Senior Secondary School, Bathinda
- St. Xavier's Senior Secondary School, Chandigarh
- St. Xavier's World School, Bathinda
- St. Xavier's Public School, Pathrala
- St. Xavier's High School, Rampuraphul, Bathinda
- St. Xavier's Public School, Gurthari, Sangat Mandi, Dist- Bhatinda.

=== Rajasthan ===
- St. Xavier's College, Jaipur
- St. Xavier's Public School, Nirman Nagar, Jaipur
- St. Xavier's School, Behror
- St. Xavier's School, Bhiwadi
- St. Xavier's School, Jaipur
- St. Xavier's School, Nevta, Jaipur

=== Tamil Nadu ===
- St. Francis Xavier Anglo Indian Higher Secondary School, Broadway
- St. Xavier's College of Engineering, Chunkankadai
- St. Xavier's College, Palayamkottai
- St. Xaviers College, Tirunelveli
- St. Xavier's Higher Secondary School, Palayamkottai
- St. Xavier's Higher Secondary School, Thoothukudi

=== Uttar Pradesh ===
- St. Xavier's High School, Ailwal Azamgarh
- St. Francis Xavier's Inter College, Kanpur
- St. Xavier High School, Sultanpur
- St. Xavier's High School, Hardoi
- St. Xavier's Inter College, BHEL Jhansi
- St. Xavier's Public School, Dalla
- St. Xavier's Public School, Gorakhpur
- St. Xavier's Public School, Trilochan Mahadev
- St. Xavier's Senior Secondary School, Balrampur
- St. Xavier's World School for Kids, Meerut
- St. Xavier's World School, Meerapur, Muzaffarnagar district
- St. Xavier's Senior Secondary School, Gonda
- St Xavier's High School, Greater Noida West, Uttar Pradesh
- St. Xavier's High School, Ghosi Mau
- St. Xavier's Public School, Sultanpur
- St. Xavier's High School, Padrauna, Kushinagar

=== West Bengal ===
- St. Francis Xavier School, Kolkata (Bidhannagar)
- St. Xavier's College, Burdwan
- St. Xavier's College, Kolkata
- St. Xavier's Collegiate School, Kolkata
- St. Xavier's Institution (Panihati)
- St. Xavier's Public School, Khagrabari, Coochbehar
- St. Xavier's Public School, Mathabhanga, Coochbehar
- St. Xavier's Public School, Liluah, Kolkata
- St. Xavier's Public School, Rampurhat
- St. Xavier's School, Malda district
- St. Xavier's School, Burdwan (Bardhaman)
- St. Xavier's School, Durgapur
- St. Xavier's School, Raiganj
- St. Xavier's University, Kolkata
- St. Xavier’s School, Haldia
- St. Xavier's Public School, Bagnan
- St. Xavier's Public School, Raghunathpur
- St. Xavier's Public School, Bagodar
- St. Xavier's Public School, Joypur, Hoogly

== Indonesia ==
- Franciscus Xaverius Junior High School, Palembang, South Sumatra
- Franciscus Xaverius Senior High School, Palembang, South Sumatra

== Ireland ==
- St. Francis Xavier's College, Dublin, usually known as Belvedere College
- St. Francis Xavier Junior and Senior National Schools

== Panama ==
- Xavier College, Panama

== Madagascar ==
- Xavier College, Fianarantsoa

== Malaysia ==
=== Penang ===
- St. Xavier Branch School, Pulau Tikus
- St. Xavier's Institution, George Town

=== Perak ===
- St. Francis' School, Sitiawan

=== Melaka ===
- St. Francis' Institution

=== Sabah ===
- SMK St. Francis Convent (M), Kota Kinabalu

== Micronesia ==
- Xavier High School, Weno, Chuuk

== Nepal ==
- St. Xavier's College, Kathmandu, Bagmati Province
- St. Xavier's School, Godavari, Bagmati Province
- St. Xavier's School, Jawalakhel, Bagmati Province
- St. Xavier's School, Deonia, Koshi Province
- St. Xavier School, Gandaki Province

== New Zealand ==
- Xavier College, Christchurch, Canterbury, now Catholic Cathedral College
- St Francis Xavier Catholic Primary School, Whangārei
- St Francis Xavier Catholic Primary School, Tawa, Wellington

== Pakistan ==
- St. Francis Xavier Seminary, Yuhannabad, Punjab

== Paraguay ==
- Colegio Técnico Javier, Asunción, Gran Asunción
- Instituto Superior de Estudios Humanísticos y Filosóficos San Francisco Javier (ISEHF), Asunción, Gran Asunción

== Philippines ==
- Xavier School, San Juan City, Metro Manila and Nuvali, Canlubang, Calamba, Laguna
- Xavier University – Ateneo de Cagayan, Cagayan de Oro, Misamis Oriental

== Spain ==
- St. Francis Xavier School, Burgos
- Xavier College, Santiago de Compostela
- Xavier College, Tudela

== Sri Lanka ==
- St. Xavier's Boys' College, Mannar, Northern Province
- St. Xavier's College, Marawila, North Western Province
- St. Xavier's College, Nuwara Eliya, Central Province
- St. Xavier's Girls' College, Mannar, Northern Province

== Taiwan ==
- St. Francis Xavier High School, Taoyuan District, Taoyuan

== Thailand ==
- St. Francis Xavier Convent School, Bangkok
- St. Francis Xavier School, Nonthaburi Saint Francis Xavier School

== United Kingdom ==
=== England ===
- St Francis Xavier's College, Liverpool
- Saint Francis Xavier College, Clapham, London
- St Francis Xavier School, North Yorkshire
- Xaverian College, Manchester
- St. Francis Xavier RC Primary, Oldbury, West Midlands
- St. Francis Xavier Sixth Form College, Balham, London

=== Scotland ===
- St. Francis Xavier's RC Primary, Falkirk

== United States ==
=== Arizona ===
- Xavier College Preparatory, Phoenix

=== California ===
- Xavier College Preparatory High School, Palm Desert

=== Connecticut ===
- Xavier High School, Middletown

=== Georgia ===
- St. Francis Xavier Catholic School, Brunswick

=== Idaho ===
- Xavier Charter School, Twin Falls

=== Illinois ===
- St. Xavier University, Chicago

=== Iowa ===
- Xavier High School, Cedar Rapids

=== Kansas ===
- St. Xavier High School, Junction City

=== Kentucky ===
- St. Xavier High School (Louisville)

=== Louisiana ===
- Xavier University of Louisiana, New Orleans
- Xavier University Preparatory School, New Orleans

=== Massachusetts ===
- Xavier High School, Concord
- Xaverian Brothers High School, Westwood

=== Minnesota ===
- St. Francis Xavier Catholic School, Sartell

=== New York ===
- St. Francis Xavier Elementary School, Bronx, New York City
- Xavier High School, Manhattan, New York City

=== Ohio ===
- St. Francis Xavier Seminary, now Athenaeum of Ohio, Cincinnati
- St. Xavier High School, Cincinnati
- St. Xavier Commercial School, Cincinnati (defunct)
- Xavier University, Cincinnati

=== Rhode Island ===
- St. Xavier's High School, Providence

=== South Carolina ===
- St. Francis Xavier High School, Sumter

=== Texas ===
- Xavier Educational Academy, Houston

=== Utah ===
- St. Francis Xavier School, Kearns

=== Wisconsin ===
- Xavier High School, Appleton

== Zimbabwe ==
- St Francis Xavier College, Zvimba, Mashonaland West, commonly known as Kutama College

== Fiction ==
- Xavier Institute for Higher Learning

== See also ==
- Xavier University (disambiguation)
- List of Jesuit institutions
- St. Xavier (disambiguation)
- Xavier (disambiguation)
- St. Francis Xavier (disambiguation)
