= Baranagore Ramakrishna Mission Ashrama High School =

Senior secondary boys' school in West Bengal, India

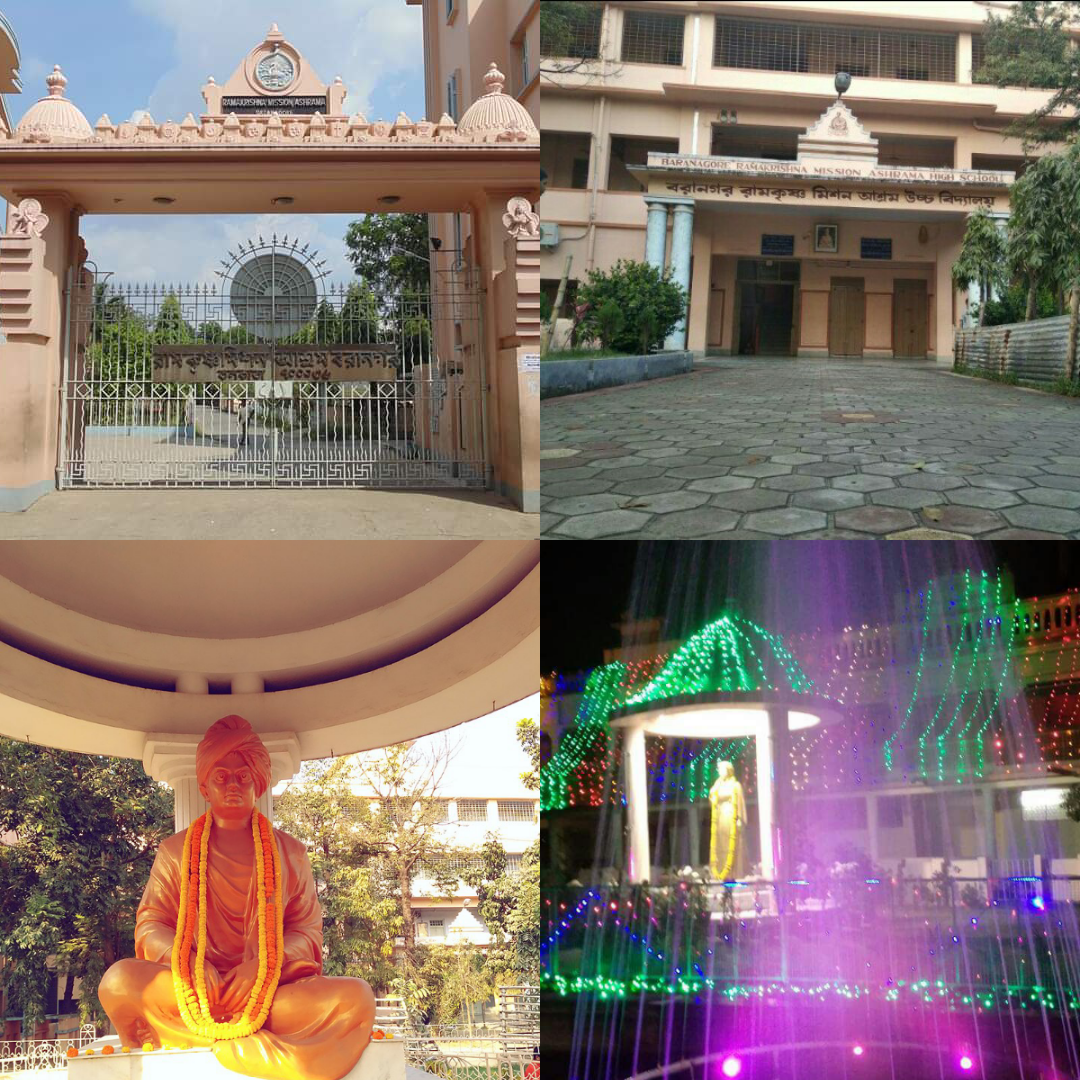
- Clockwise from top left: Main entrance of school, main academic building of secondary section, statue of Sister Nivedita, statue of Swami Vivekananda

Location
- 37, Gopal Lal Tagore Road, Baranagar; Kolkata, West Bengal, 700036; India; 22°38′04.20″N 88°22′13.57″E

Information
- Former name: Brahmananda Balakashrama (1912–1924)
- Type: Private (Higher secondary)
- Motto: Atmano mokshartham jagat hitaya cha (For the salvation of our individual self and for the well-being of all on earth)
- Religious affiliation: Hinduism
- Established: 20 April 1912; 114 years ago
- Founder: Yogindranath Tagore
- Status: Active
- Sister school: Ramakrishna Mission Centenary Primary School, Baranagore (Estd. 1897)
- School board: WBBSE; WBCHSE
- School district: North 24 Parganas
- Authority: Ramakrishna Mission Ashrama, Baranagore
- Session: January–December (V – X) June–May (XI – XII)
- School code: B1-019 (WBBSE); 03691 (WBCHSE)
- Director: Swami Purnagyanananda (Secretary)
- Headmaster: Swami Suratmananda
- Head teacher: Swami Suratmananda ( Headmaster); Swami Gatabhayananda (Assistant Headmaster)
- Grades: V–XII
- Gender: Male
- Age range: 10+ to 18+
- Enrolment: 1100
- Language: Bengali, English
- Schedule type: Day
- Schedule: Monday – Friday: 10:40 am – 4:30 pm (V – X); 10:40 am – 3:50 pm (XI – XII) Saturday: 10:40am – 1:55pm (V – X)
- Hours in school day: Monday – Friday: 5–6 hrs Saturday: 3–4 hrs
- Campus size: 3 acres (121,359 m^{2})
- Campus type: Urban
- Houses: Sarada Bhawan; Nivedita Bhawan
- Student Union/Association: BRKMAHS Ex-students Reunion Celebration Committee
- Colours: White and Grey (V – X) Blue and Grey (XI – XII)
- Song: Om Sahana Bhabatu; Jana Gana Mana
- Sports: Cricket, Football
- Nickname: BRKMAHS
- Yearbook: Rashmi (রশ্মি)
- Alumni: See below
- Website: www.rkmabaranagore.org

Baranagore Ramakrishna Mission Ashrama High School (H.S.) (Note: Official name of the school, including "(H. S.)", since 14 May 2018.) (BRKMAHS) is a selective senior secondary boys' school in Baranagar, Kolkata, India and a branch centre of Ramakrishna Math and Ramakrishna Mission, Belur Math. The school was founded in 1912, and is located at the northern outskirt of Kolkata, on the banks of the river Ganga. The school is run by the Baranagar Ramakrishna Mission Ashrama Authority under the umbrella of Ramakrishna Mission headquartered at Belur Math. Based on its performance of the students in the Xth standard board examination, the school is considered one of the very best schools in West Bengal. Department of Tourism (West Bengal) listed it as one of the tourist spots of West Bengal.

== Emblem ==
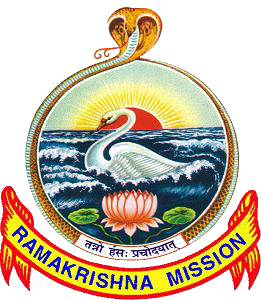
Emblem of BRKMAHS

Designed and explained by Swami Vivekananda in his own words:

The wavy waters in the picture are symbolic of Karma; the lotus, of Bhakti; and the rising-sun, of Jnana. The encircling serpent is indicative of Yoga and the awakened Kundalini Shakti, while the swan in the picture stands for Paramatman (Supreme Self). Therefore, the idea of the picture is that by the union of Karma, Jnana, Bhakti and Yoga, the vision of Paramatman is obtained.

== Establishment ==
The "Brahmananda Ramakrishna Mission" of the twentieth century is today's "Baranagar Ramakrishna Mission Ashrama". Then the twentieth century was in its childhood – the great hero and saint Vivekananda had elevated himself like a phoenix from the ashes – his divine preaching had enchanted the young mind. India was then under the British bondage. The British Government had already issued the order, of partition of Bengal in accordance with the divide and rule policy of The Lord Curzon. The air was being rented with the melodies of Rabindranath "Banglar Mati Banglar Jol" Bengal became turbulent and agitated like "Nataraj" with the waves of anti-partition movement and this turbulence had given birth to a number of brave dreamers who were inspired by the paradigm of Swami Vivekananda. Yogindnanata Tagore, a disciple of Swami Brahmananda (Rakhal Maharaj) – a brave soldier of the anti-British movement and an active member of Anushilan Samiti, set up an orphanage in the name of his preceptor at the house of Panjas at Alambazar in North Kolkata. In 1912 on the pious day of Akshaya Tritiya, the organisation started its journey with the name "Brahmananda Balakashrama".

== History ==
=== 1912–2018 ===
Baranagore Ramakrishna Mission Ashrama High School has become an embodiment of the ideology 'service and welfare through education', since its initiation in 1912, on the day of Akshaya Tritiya. Since then, through service to the mankind, this organization successfully caters the spiritual genre, convened by Lord Sri Ramakrishna, in every possible way.

The foundation stone of this ashrama, as a "Brahmananda Balakashrama", was laid by Sri Yogindranath Tagore, an eminent freedom-fighter and disciple of Srimat Swami Brahmanandaji Maharaj, the first president of Ramakrishna Order. Later it was shifted into a one storied building adjacent to Jaikrishna Mitra Kalibari at Kutighat in the name of, "Baranagar Ramakrishna Ashrama for Orphan". Then, in 1924 the Ashrama was acquired by Belur Math as a branch centre and hence, renamed as "Ramakrishna Mission Ashrama, Baranagore". On 20 February 1928, by the patronage of the late zaminders of Narali, Jessore, the Ashrama procured a land of 8 bighas and 8 chhatak beside Gopal Lal Tagore Road. It was the same Akshaya Tritiya on 11 May 1929 the Ashrama was shifted to the plot.

The primary school, set up in the Ashrama premises in 1934, was sequentially upgraded to upper primary and then to lower secondary section in the year 1952. The multifaceted upper secondary wing of the institution was inaugurated in 1954 and it, henceforth, got the recognition of 'Madhyamik' (Secondary).

11 May 1998, on the auspicious Buddha Purnima, a parallel primary wing of the institution (from Class I to Class IV) was incepted under the jurisdiction of Ramakrishna Mission, Belur Math. This new segment was named "Ramakrishna Mission Centenary Primary School, Baranagore" and was inaugurated by Revered Srimat Swami Lokeshwaranandaji on the occasion of 'Centenary Celebration'.

=== 2018–Present ===
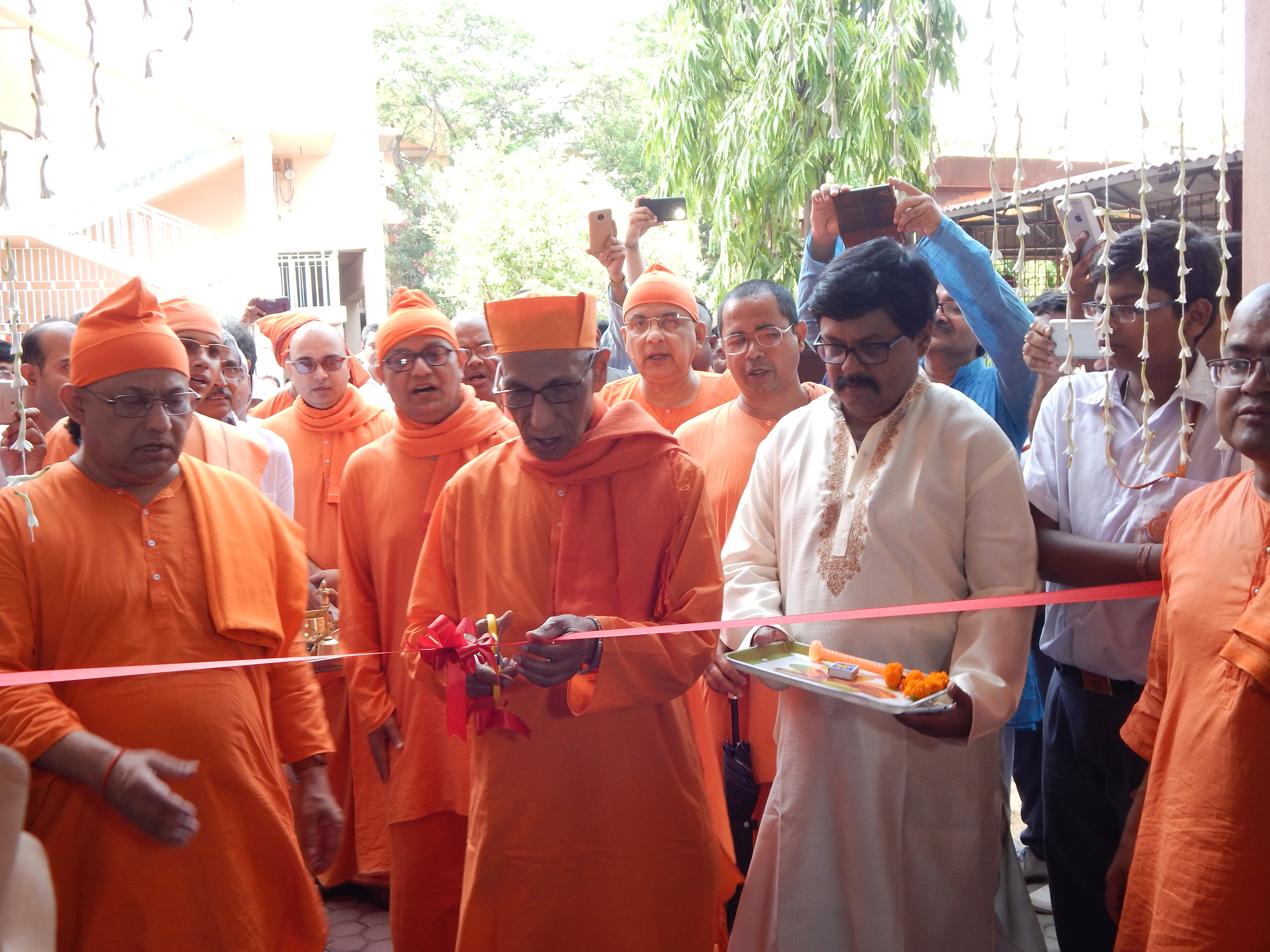
Inauguration of the higher secondary section school building "Nivedita Bhawan" in 2018

After a prolonged yet rigorous effort of 42 years, this institution has been elevated to the Higher Secondary level in 2018 and education is being imparted through Bengali and English medium in this section. The first batch of Higher Secondary has come out of the school in the pandemic-hit year of 2020.

== Campus ==
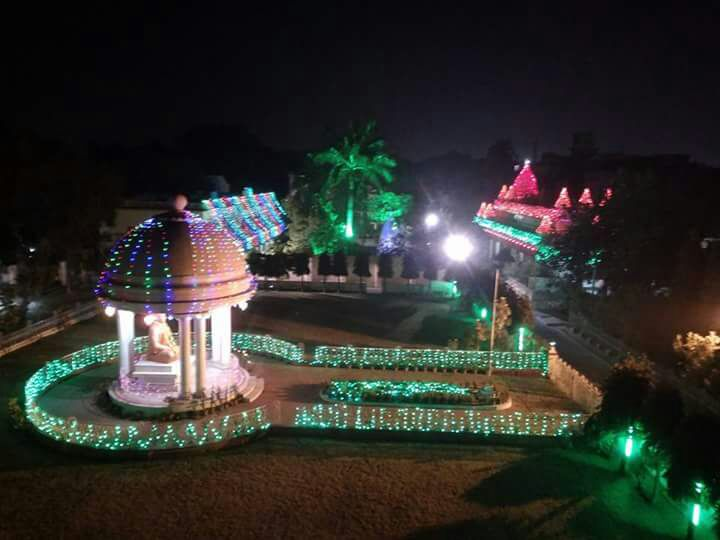
Top view of BRKM campus during annual festival in 2018

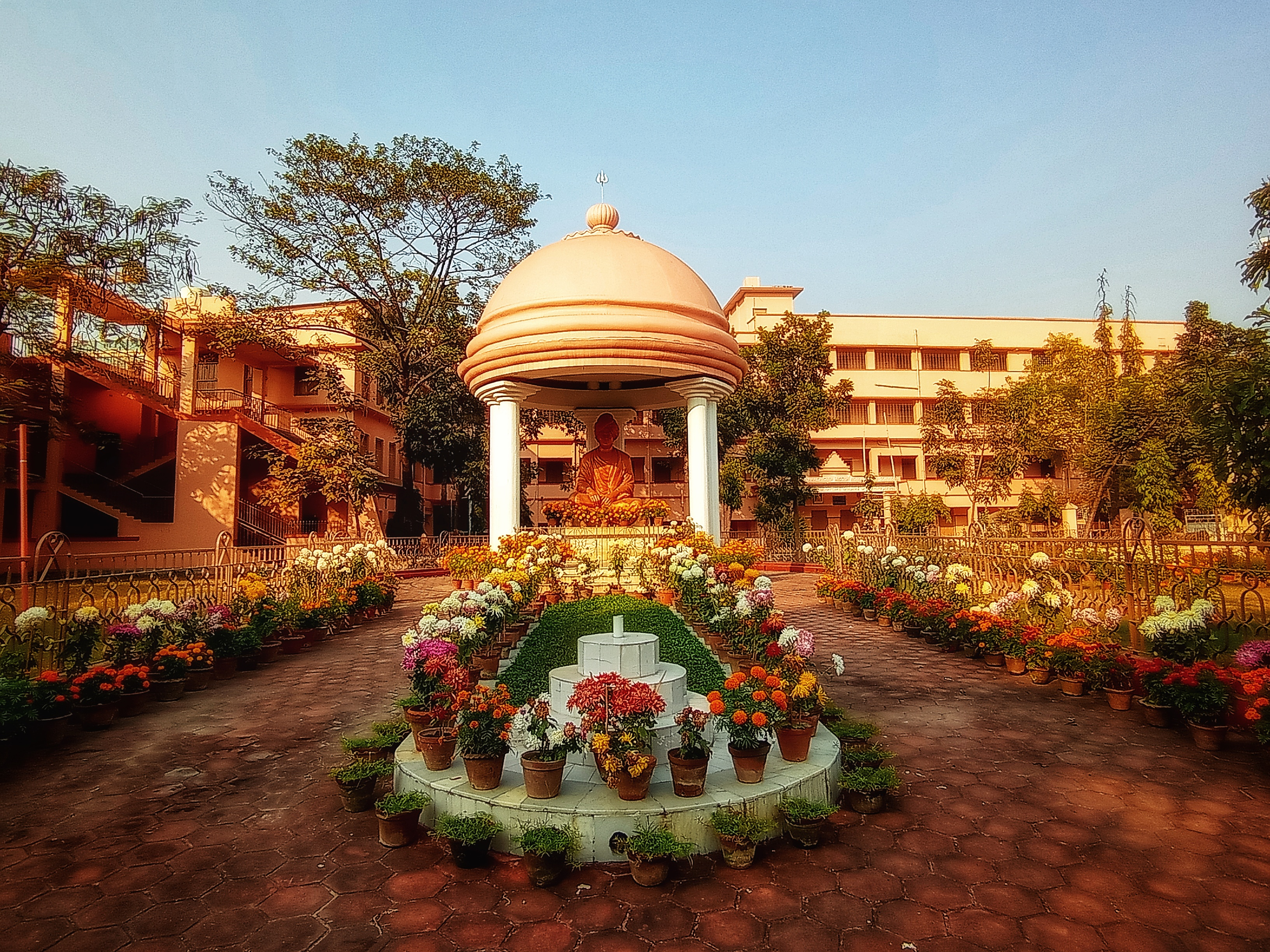
Statue of Swami Vivekananda at BRKM campus

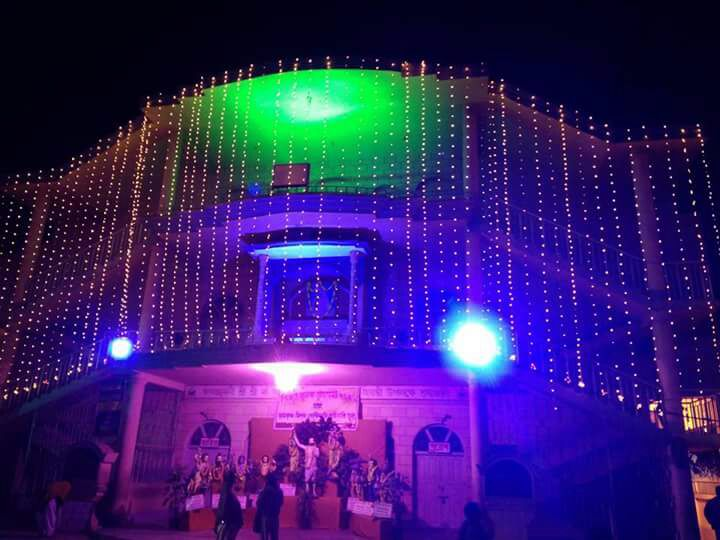
Sarada Bhawan prayer hall

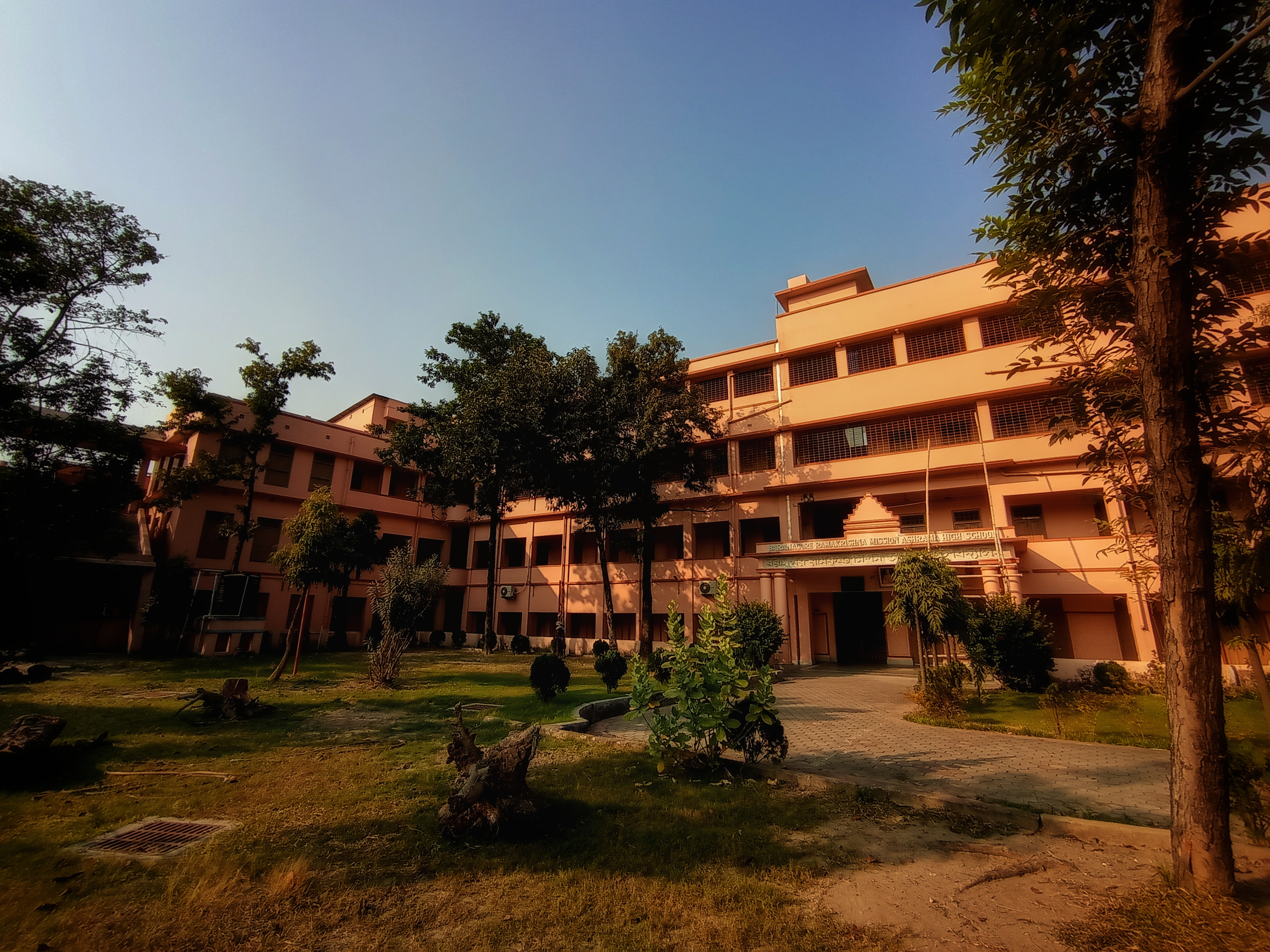
Main academic building of secondary section

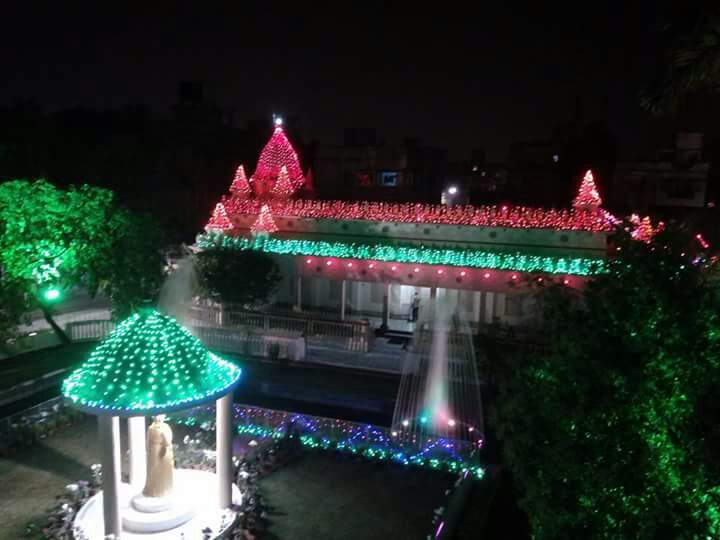
Temple at BRKM campus

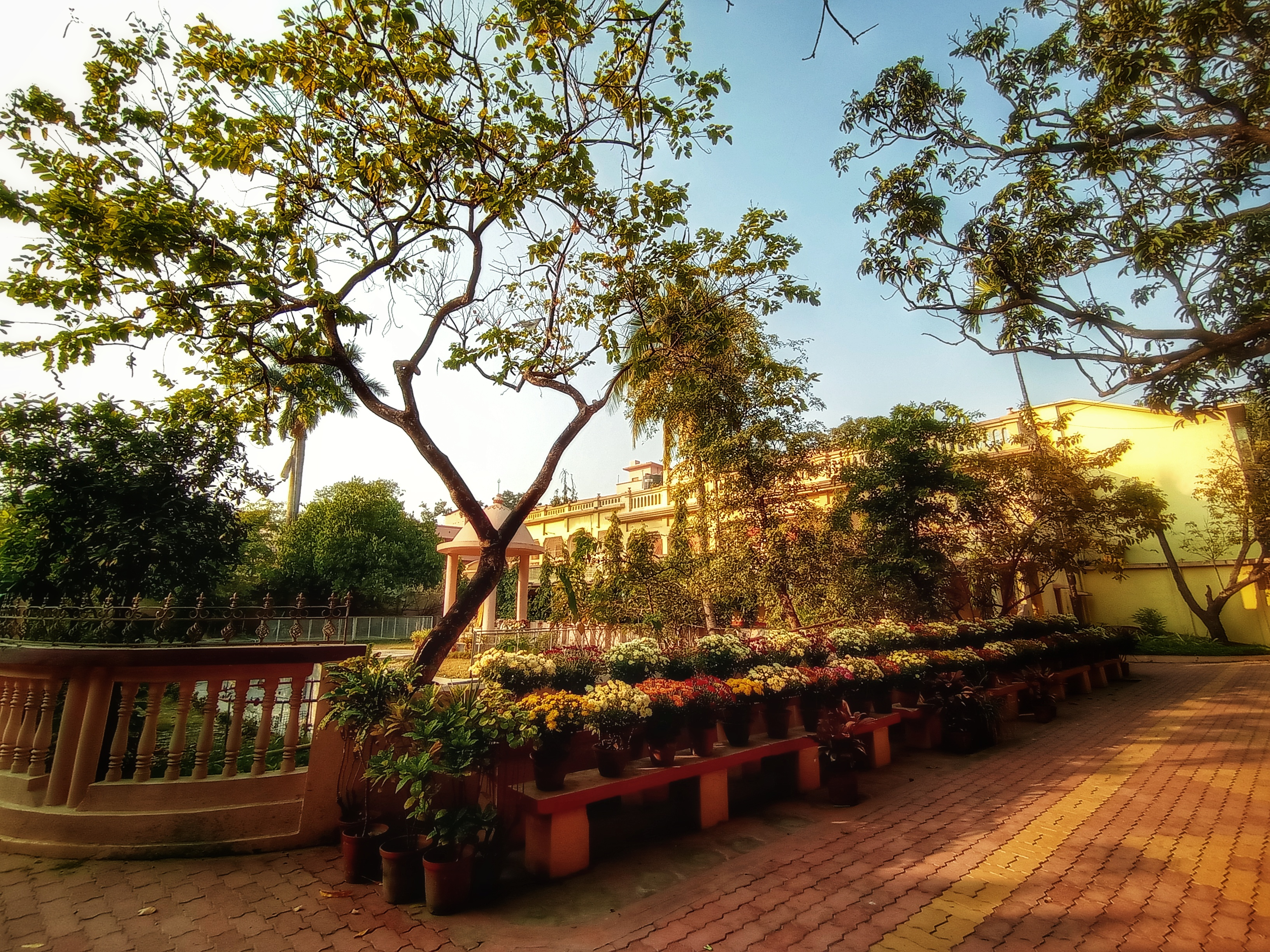
Open air corridor in front of the primary section building

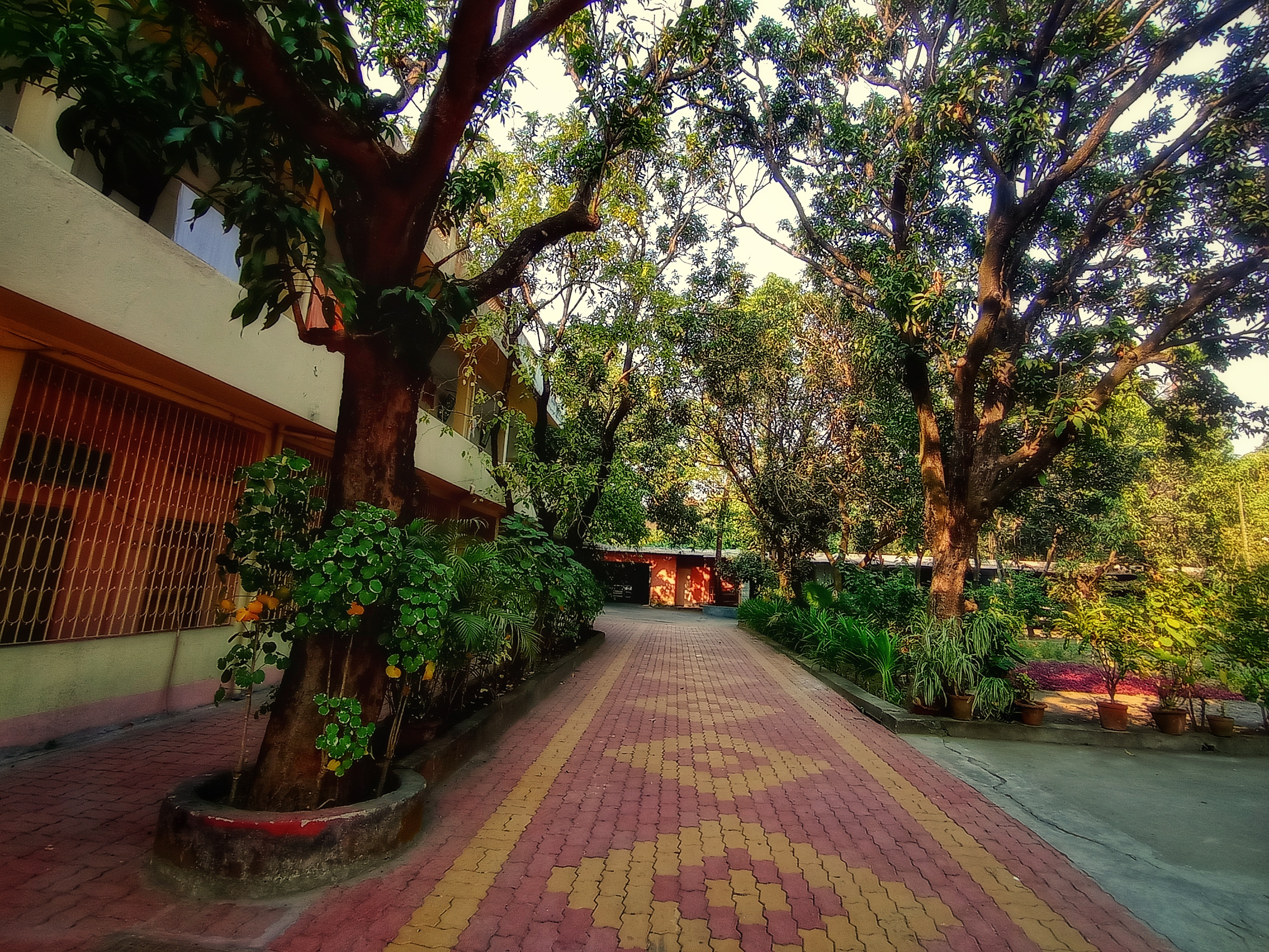
Monk's quarters

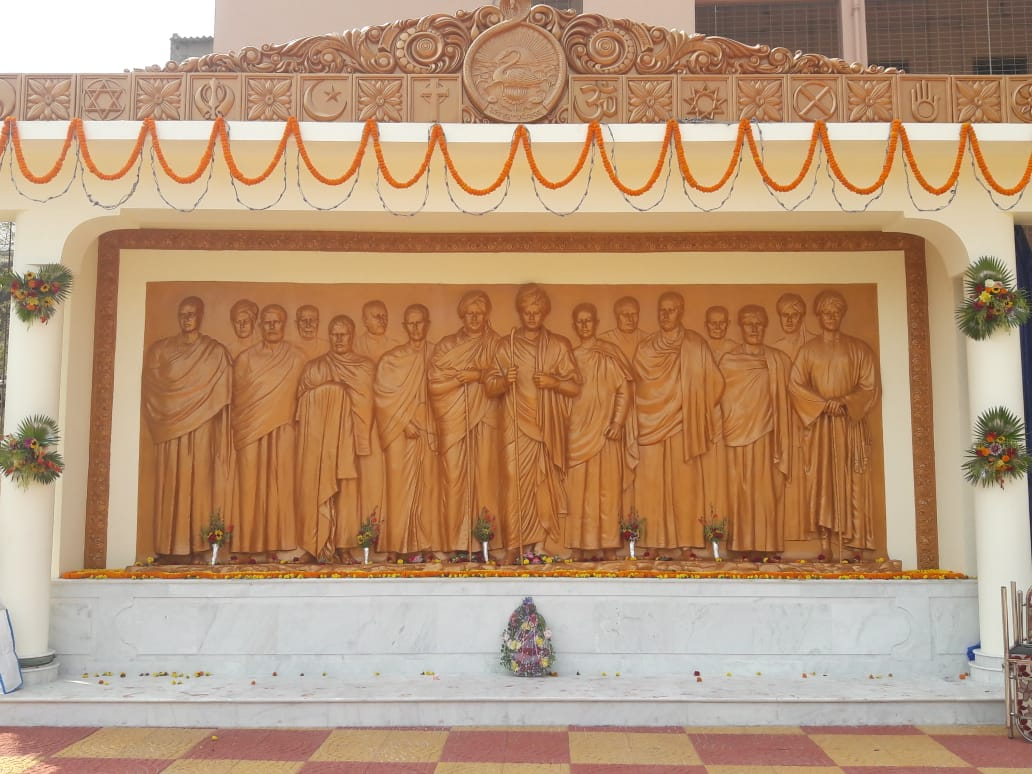
Fibreglass relievo of Sri Ramakrishna's Monastic Disciples

Ashrama has a large and green campus. It contains a primary school section, secondary and higher secondary school section, libraries, three free coaching centres, a charitable homeopathic dispensary, a mobile medical unit, prayer hall, a temple, monk's quarters and playgrounds. A fibreglass relievo (17 ft x 22 ft) of Sri Ramakrishna's Monastic Disciples was inaugurated in Ramakrishna Mission Baranagar by Revered Swami Shivamayananda ji Maharaj on 15 March 2021. On 6 October 2023, the showroom-cum-sales Counter at Ramakrishna Mission Ashrama, Baranagar was inaugurated by Swami Suvirananda ji, General Secretary, Ramakrishna Math and Ramakrishna Mission.

== Infrastructure ==
=== Secondary section ===
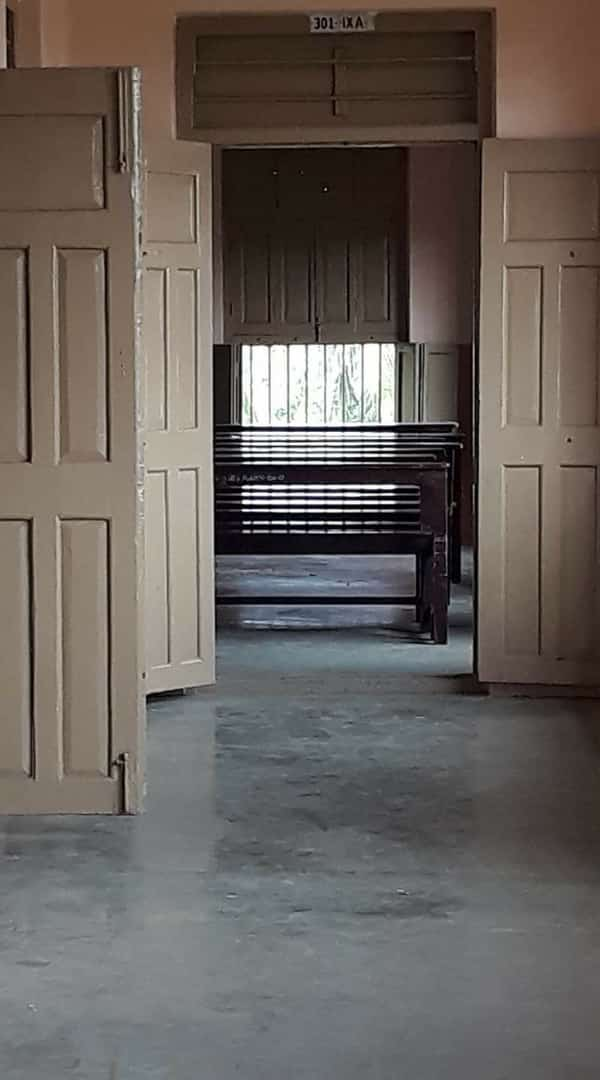
Corridor of secondary section building of school

There are two secondary section buildings in the school campus, one for classes (V – VIII) and the other for classes (IX – X). There are five sections in each of the classes from V – VIII and in IX and X there are four sections each.

=== Higher secondary section ===
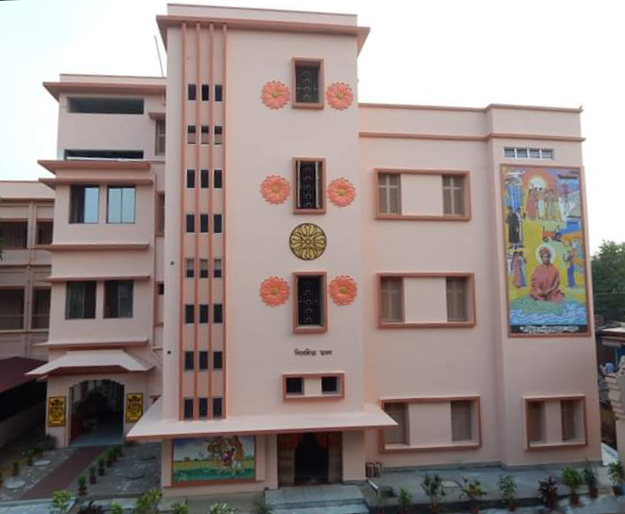
Nivedita Bhawan

There is one higher secondary section building in school campus for classes XI and XII. The building is named "Nivedita Bhawan" which was inaugurated by Swami Suhitananda ji maharaj on 14 May 2018.

== Affiliations ==
Secondary section (V – X) is affiliated by West Bengal Board of Secondary Education and higher secondary section (XI – XII) is affiliated by West Bengal Council of Higher Secondary Education.

== Academics ==
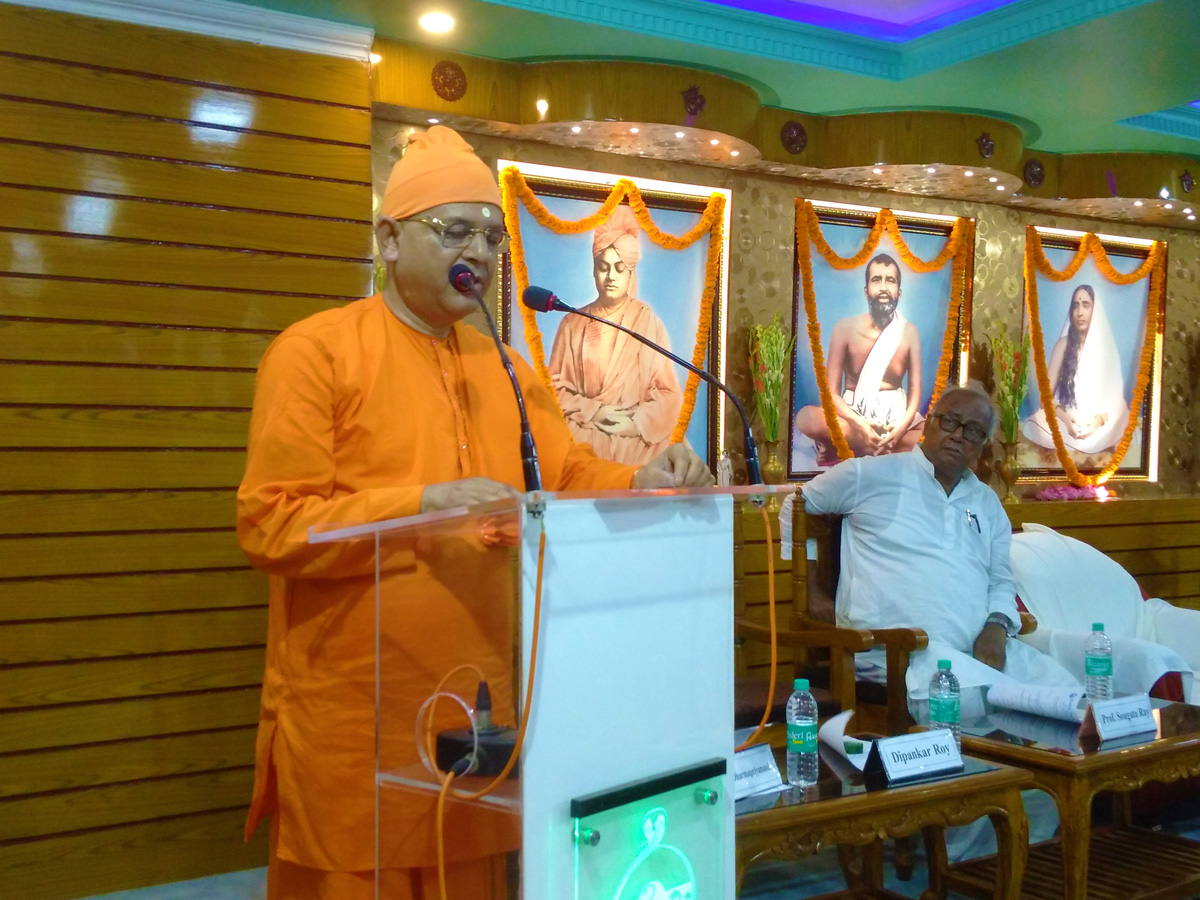
Swami Suvirananda's speech at the inauguration programme, Saugata Roy (right) was a chief guest

BRKMAHS started the Higher Secondary course, in commemoration of the 125th Anniversary of Swami Vivekananda's historic speech in the World Parliament of Religions at Chicago. Swami Suvirananda, General Secretary, Ramakrishna Math and Ramakrishna Mission, inaugurated the course in a programme at the Ashrama premises on 22 June 2018 evening.

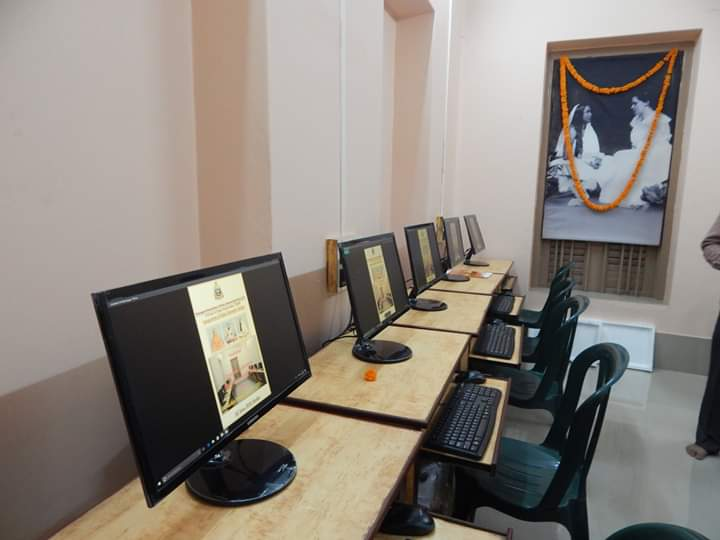
Computer laboratory of higher secondary school of school

As of 2021, the curriculum of higher secondary section, affiliated by WBCHSE, consisted of Arts and Science streams.

== Organisation structure ==
Headmaster of Baranagore Ramakrishna Mission Ashrama High School
- Incumbent; Swami Suratmananda since 2024
- Status: Head of Baranagore Ramakrishna Mission Ashrama High School
- Residence: Ramakrishna Bhawan
- Appointer: Belur Math
- Inaugural holder: Swami Umananda
- Deputy: Assistant headmaster of Baranagore Ramakrishna Mission Ashrama High School
- Website: https://www.rkmabaranagore.org/

List of headmasters of Baranagore Ramakrishna Mission Ashrama High School according to their working period:

List of headmasters of Baranagore Ramakrishna Mission Ashrama High School
- Swami Umananda
- Swami Ramananda
- Swami Jayananda
- Swami Girutmananda
- Swami Biswanathananda
- Swami Bidhanananda
- Swami Sukhananda, 2003–2010
- Swami Gyanalokananda, 2010–2011
- Swami Kalyaneshananda, 2011–2014
- Swami Dharmapriyananda, 2014–2020
- Swami Mahamritananda, 2020–2024
- Swami Suratmananda, 2024–Present
- Swami Tathagatananda was the head during the period 1975 – February 1977.

== Student life ==
=== Academic ===
Students are highly influenced by the faith and philosophy of Ramakrishna at this school. Former student Shiboprosad Mukherjee said:

In our school, we used to have a special class on religion, and we weren't a big fan of the class. Whenever we got an opportunity, we would bunk classes. But one particular lesson in that class moved me to the core and changed my whole perception about religion. It can be anything and any philosophy.

Former cricketer Sourav Ganguly said:

I like the atmosphere of Ramakrishna Mission schools. There is an opportunity here for you to excel in both sports and studies. You should avail yourselves of these facilities and put your best foot forward.

=== Social activities ===
==== Swachh Bharat Mission ====
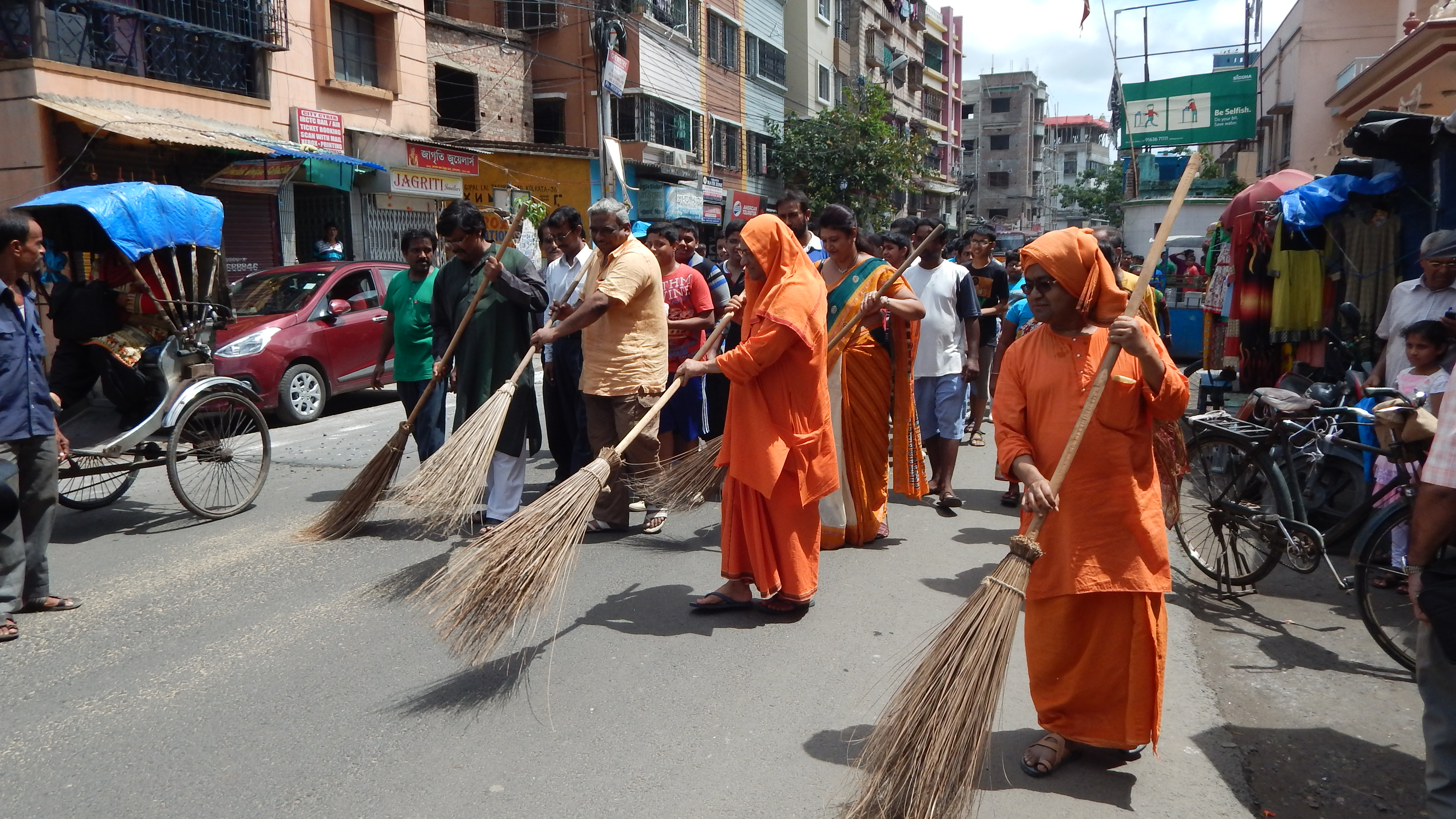
Swachh Bharat Mission

BRKMAHS arranged an intensive cleaning programme Swachh Bharat Mission in the neighbouring locality on 30 June 2016, in accordance with the instruction given by the headquarters Belur Math. More than 600 students of standards VIII, IX and X actively participated in the programme under the guidance of monastic members and brahmacharies of the Ashrama and almost all the teaching and non-teaching staff of the high school.

==== COVID-19 relief services ====
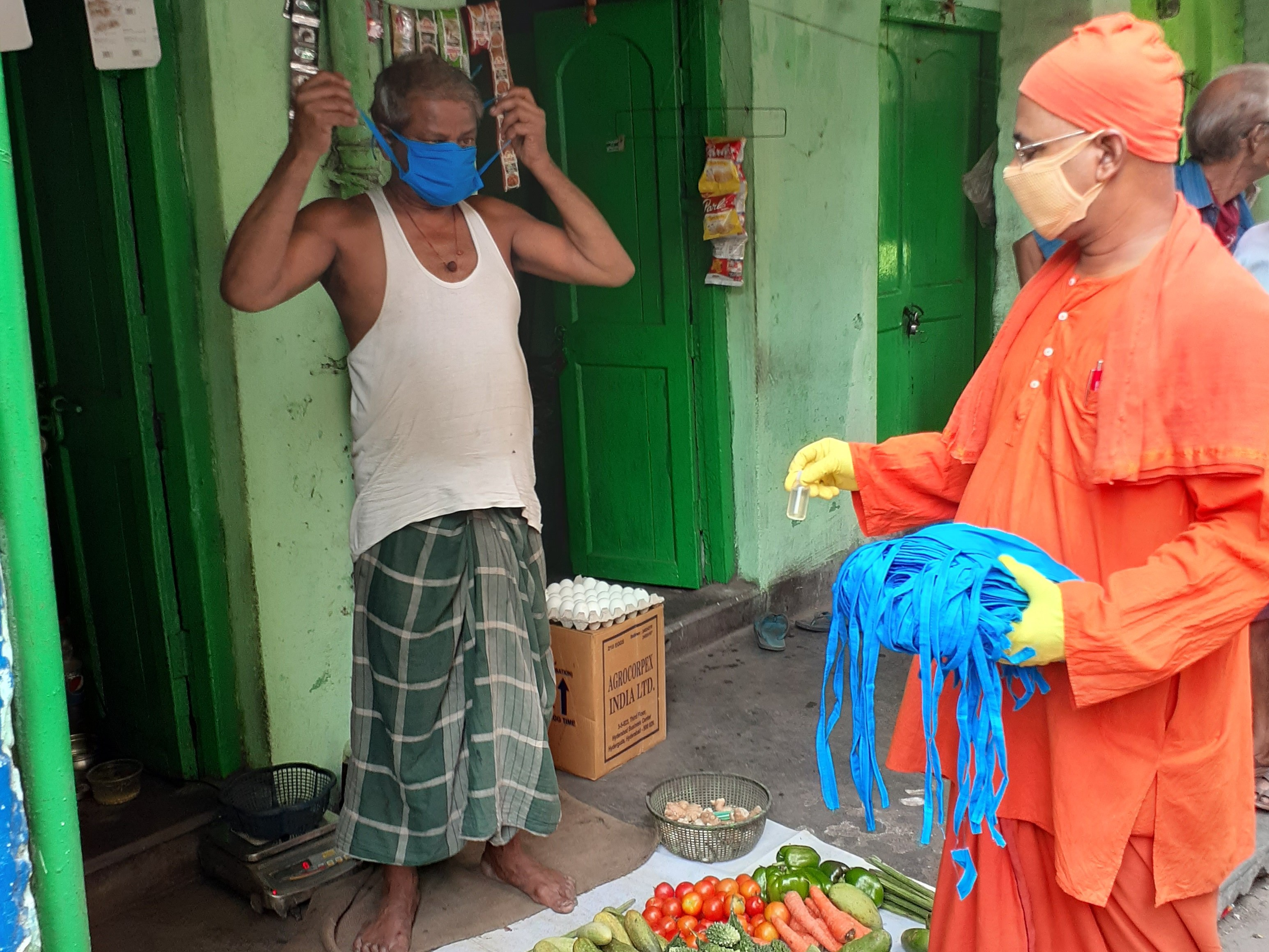
Distribution of masks during COVID-19 pandemic

BRKM is continuing the relief services to the families affected by the lockdown due to the COVID-19 pandemic.

Ex-students of BRKMAHS (2010 Madhyamik batch) organised a COVID relief fund and delivered much-needed oxygen, food, and necessary things to COVID-19 affected patients and their families of Baranagar and neighborhood areas.

==== Amphan relief services ====
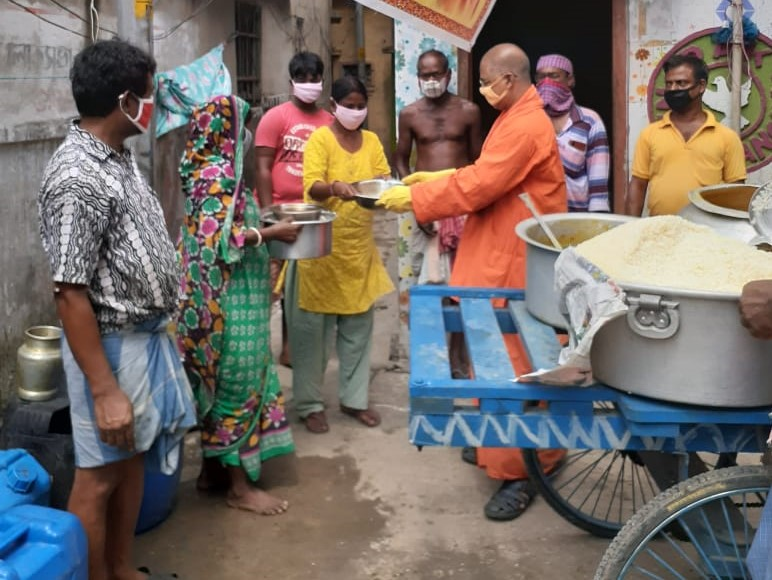
Distribution of foods after Amphan cyclone

BRKM started Amphan cyclone relief services to aid families affected by the Cyclone Amphan which wreaked havoc on 20 May 2020.

==== Others ====
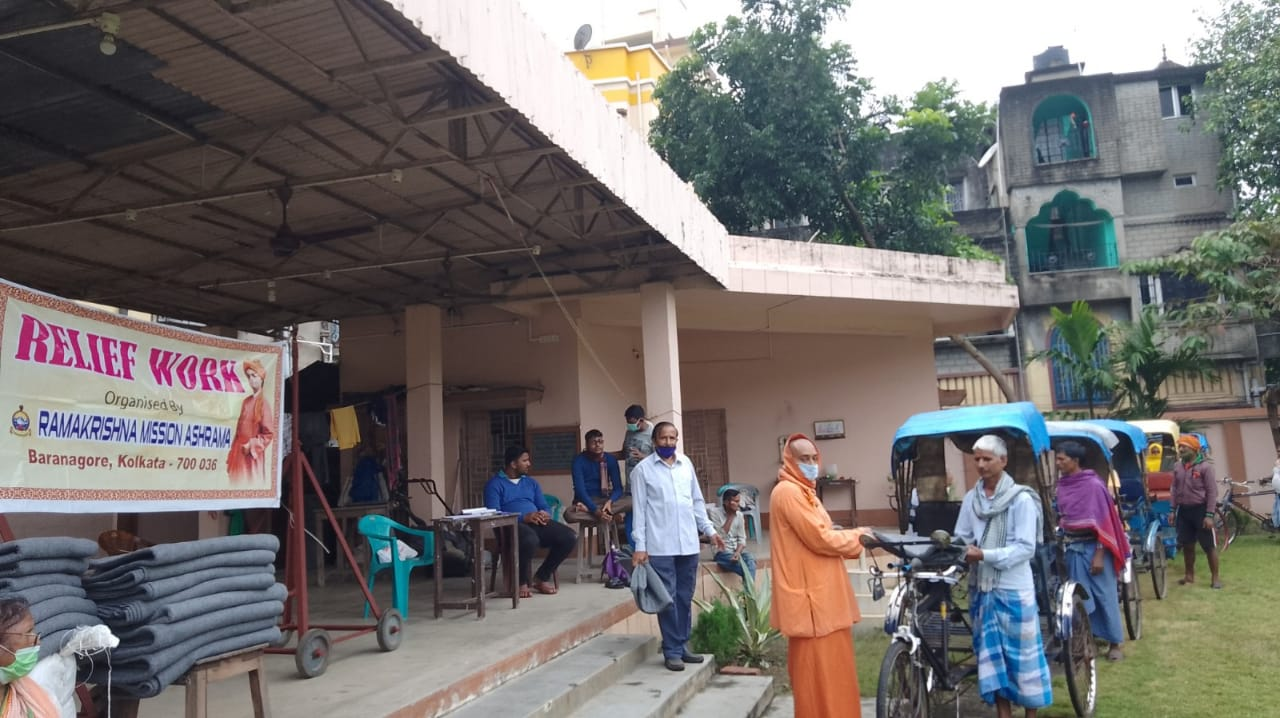
Distribution of blankets at school's sport ground Nivedita Krirangan in January 2022

BRKM distributed 500 blankets from 14 November 2021 to 9 January 2022 in Baranagar, Dakshineshwar and Harit. BRKM conducted eye camps at Harit on 7 August and 18 September 2022. BRKM organized a distress relief work in December 2023. BRKM organized youth activities from April to July in 2024. BRKM conducted a winter relief initiative from October 2024 to January 2025.

=== Cultural activities ===
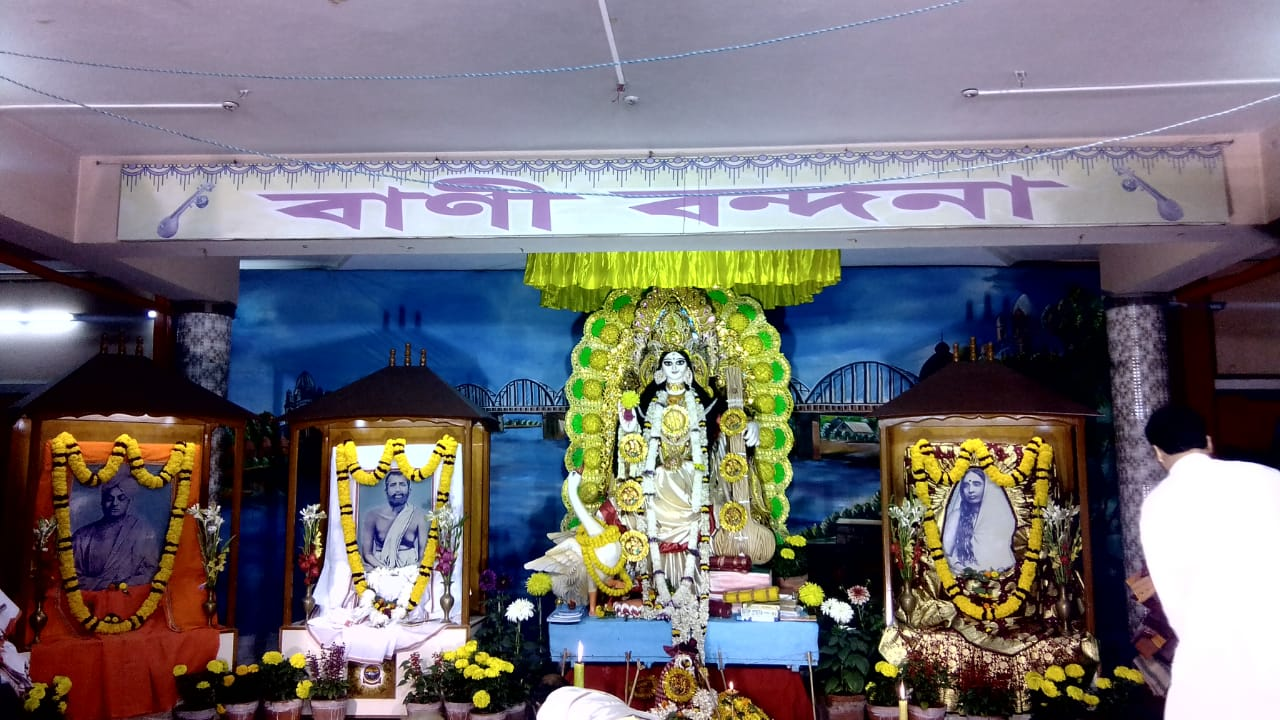
Saraswati Puja at BRKM in 2019

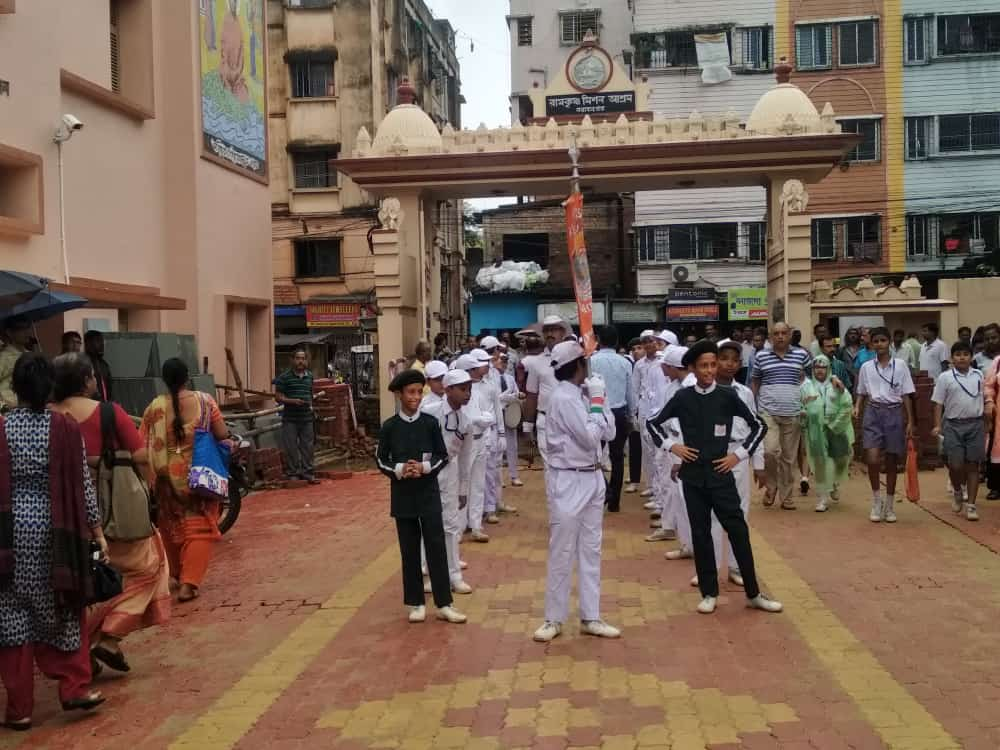
Independence Day celebration at school premises in 2019

Following cultural festivals and activities are held at school premises & Nivedita Krirangan in a befitting manner by the students of school in every year:

- National Youth Day
- Birthday of Netaji
- Republic Day
- Saraswati Puja
- Birthday of Ramakrishna
- Maha Shivaratri
- Akshaya Tritiya (school foundation day)
- Rabindra Jayanti
- Independence Day
- Kali Puja
- Birthday of Sarada Devi

Devotees’ Conference is also once held in every year during annual festival of school.

== Alumni association ==
Baranagore Ramakrishna Mission Ashrama High School Ex-students Reunion Celebration Committee is the name of alumni association committee of BRKMAHS. This committee every year celebrates reunion ceremony for ex-students of the school. They are connected with many social activities throughout the year.

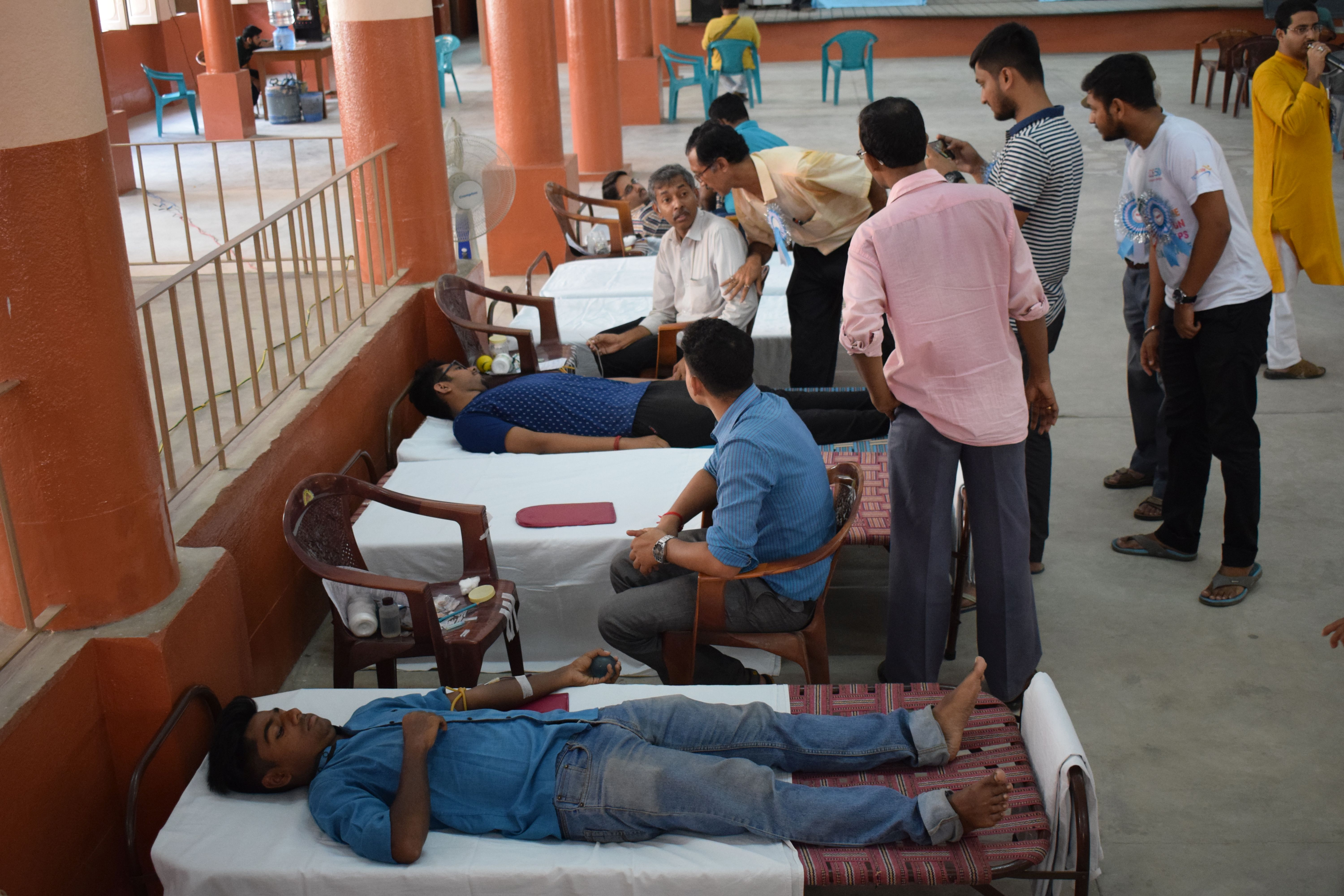
Blood donation camp

Baranagore Ramakrishna Mission Ashrama Praktan Chhatra Samsad under the guidance of Ramakrishna Mission Ashrama, Baranagore, organised a "Voluntary Blood donation Camp" on 15 September 2019, in association with blood bank of Ramakrishna Mission Seva Pratishthan, Kolkata, as a part of the concluding – 125th Anniversary of Swami Vivekananda's Chicago Addresses at Sarada Bhawan. Total 51 units of blood were donated by ex-students of the ashrama high school, teachers, monastic members of different branch centres of the Ramakrishna Mission, Ashrama staff, volunteers and devotees. Baranagore Ramakrishna Mission Ashrama Praktan Chhatra Samsad Charitable Trust felicitated all the doctors who have been dedicatedly serving the poor & distressed patients throughout the year in the ashrama's medical unit & also in medical camps at various remote places.

== Notable alumni ==
- Abhishek Chatterjee, Bengali film and television actor.
- Jeet Ganguly, score composer, music director and playback singer for Hindi and Bengali films.
- Shiboprosad Mukherjee, film director, writer and actor who works for Bengali films.
- Tathagata Mukherjee, Bengali film and television actor.
- Gautam Sarkar, ex-footballer, having represented SC East Bengal.
- Tanmoy Bhattacharya, politician, elected MLA of North Dum Dum constituency, 2016–2021.

== Gallery ==
Images of Baranagore Ramakrishna Mission Ashrama High School
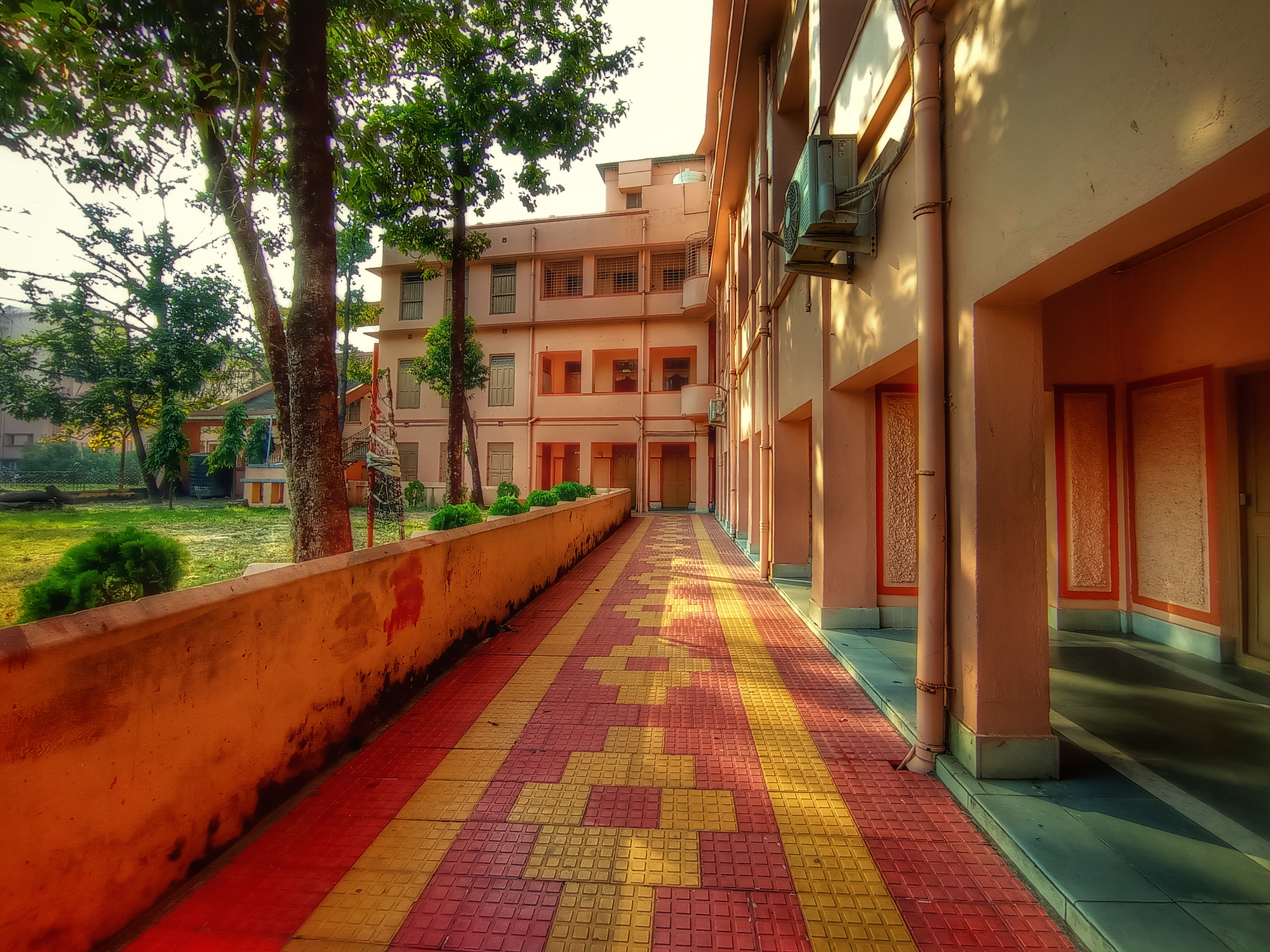
Open air corridor of the secondary section

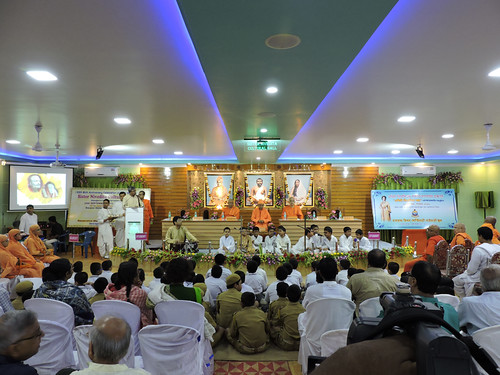
Interior of Sister Nivedita Cultural Hall

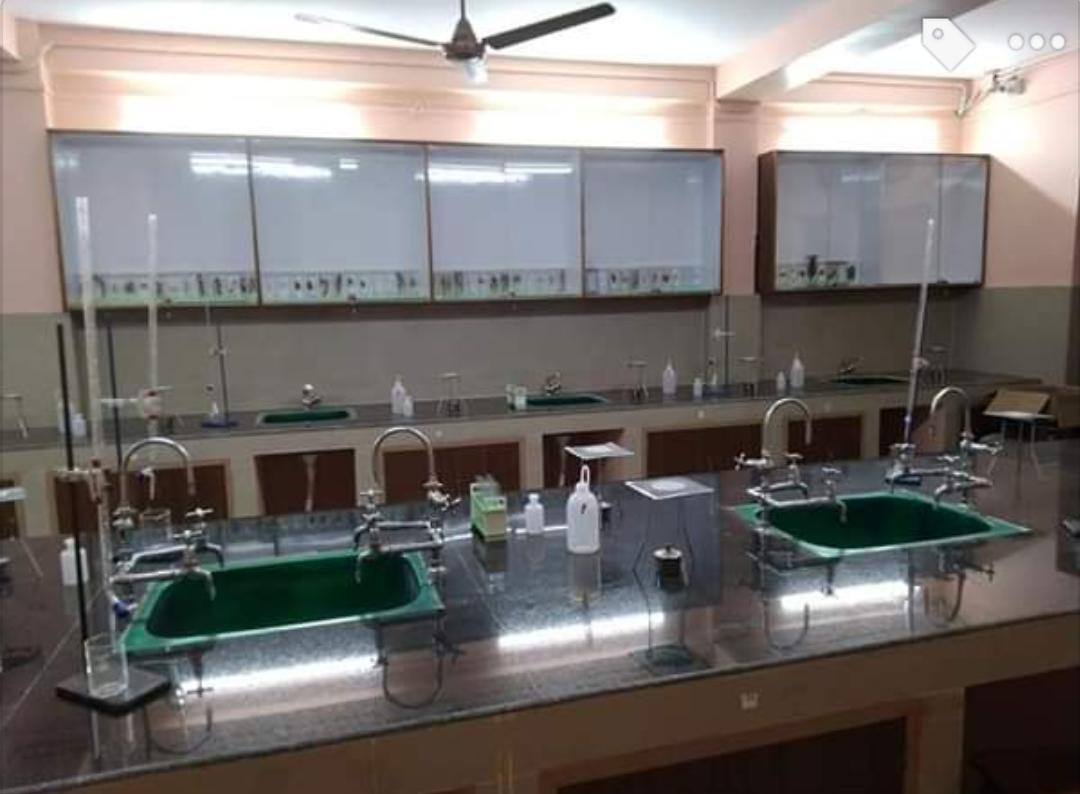
Biology laboratory
Images related to BRKMAHS

== See also ==
- List of Ramakrishna Mission institutions
- List of schools in Kolkata
