= Tanmoy Bhattacharya =

Indian politician

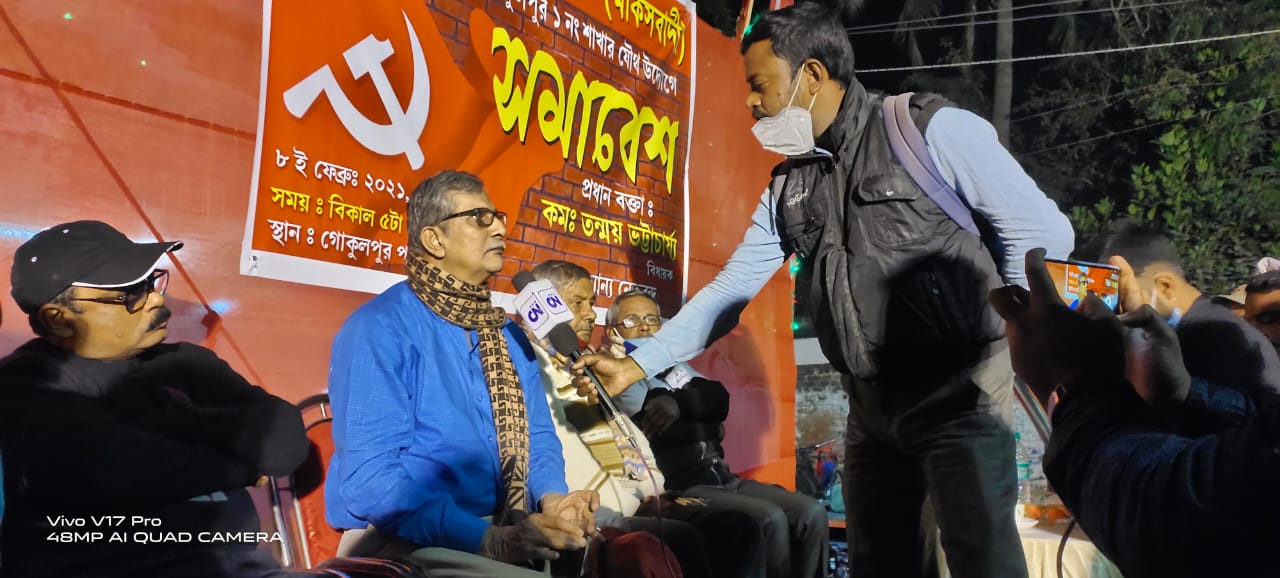
- Tanmoy Bhattacharya, Former MLA of Uttar Dum Dum

Member of West Bengal Legislative Assembly
- In office 19 May 2016 – 2 May 2021
- Preceded by: Chandrima Bhattacharya
- Succeeded by: Chandrima Bhattacharya
- Constituency: Dum Dum Uttar

Personal details
- Born: 7 March 1958 (age 68) Noapara,West Bengal, India
- Party: Communist Party of India (Marxist)
- Children: 1
- Education: Baranagore Ramakrishna Mission Ashrama High School; St. Xavier's College

Tanmoy Bhattacharya is a former Member of the Legislative Assembly for Dum Dum Uttar. He is a prominent leader of the Communist Party of India (Marxist) from West Bengal.

== Controversy ==
A woman journalist makes sensational allegation against Bhattacharya. A molestation complaint has been filed against him at Baranagar police station. The female journalist claimed that she went to Tanmoy Bhattacharya's house for an interview on 27 October 2024, then Bhattacharya molested her. The female journalist also participated in Facebook Live. The complaining journalist said, that while taking interview, he literally sat on her lap. The State committee of CPI(M) suspended Bhattacharya for such allegation of outraging the modesty and misbehaviour with woman journalist.

== Clearance ==
Tanmoy Bhattacharya was soon cleared of any wrongdoing by the West Bengal Police and his suspension was revoked after the false complaint. [2]
