= Glen Huser =

Canadian fiction writer (born 1943)

Glen Huser (born 1 February 1943) is a Canadian fiction writer.

Vancouver School of Art, second year qualification, 1965; University of Alberta, BEd (with distinction), 1970, M.A., 1988.

== Career ==
Huser completed two years in teacher Education at the University of Alberta before starting his first career as a teacher at Rosslyn Junior High School in Edmonton, where he taught art and English for three years.

During this time he took on a part-time job reviewing films for The Edmontonian, a weekly community and entertainment magazine.

After spending a winter term at the Vancouver School of Art (1964–1965), he returned to Edmonton, taught for one year at Highlands Junior High School, and then worked as a classroom teacher at McArthur Elementary School from 1967 to 1969.

Following another year of study at the University of Alberta, he began a career as a teacher-librarian in Holyrood, Lendrum, Homesteader, Kirkness, and Overlanders Schools. In 1978, he developed Magpie, a quarterly magazine that showcased student writing and graphics and took on the job of managing editor of the publication for twenty years. From 1988 to 1996, he was a learning resources consultant for Edmonton Public Schools, working not only with Magpie, but selecting media and assisting libraries throughout the district.

In his spare time Huser reviewed children's and young adult books for the Edmonton Journal, a pursuit that would ultimately span close to twenty years.

From 1997 to 1998, he worked as a student teaching advisor at Concordia College, and then as a sessional instructor in Elementary Education at the University of Alberta from 1997 to 2000 and 2003–2004. He worked as a language arts resource writer at Oz New Media/Education-on-line from 2000 to 2001.

Following his retirement from Edmonton Public Schools, Huser worked as a writer-in-residence at a number of Edmonton schools including Aldergrove, Lendrum, Mee-Yah-Noh, and Virginia Park.

From 2006 to 2010, he developed and taught the Writing for Children and Young Adults component of UBC's online MFA in the Creative Writing program.

Mr. Huser continues to inspire young students and visits elementary schools, such as St Francis Xavier School, in Vancouver.

== Personal life ==
Huser has two sisters, Karen and Sharon, and a brother, Dale. His father, Harry Huser, was an artist, but also worked as a logger, carpenter, garage mechanic, and a school bus driver. His mother, Beatrice Daily Huser, was a teacher in Ashmont, Alberta.

In 1958, the family moved to Edmonton in order to explore greater job opportunities for his brother. At this time, Huser finished grade twelve and began university. Completing two years of study, and having then settled into teaching junior high, he nourished his love for movies by obtaining a part-time job reviewing films for a popular Edmonton magazine, The Edmontonian. After three years of teaching, Huser realized he wanted to be an artist and enrolled at the Vancouver School of Art. Finishing a year of art school, Huser decided he would rather live in Edmonton, and he returned to teaching.

It was his love for reading and writing that pushed him to be a teacher-librarian in elementary schools. When Huser was thirty three, he adopted a seven-year-old boy named Casey and from 1969 to 1970, he took part in creative writing seminars, at which time he began working on creative writing during his spare time. When he retired from teaching in 1996, he continued working on a young adult novel, Touch of the Clown, and he was hired back by the school board to make novel study packages for grades 3 to 7 students.

In 2008, Huser moved to Vancouver, where he worked as a sessional for UBC's Education and Creative Writing faculties. Huser lives alone in his Vancouver home where he continues to mentor writing students and work on his own projects.

== Works ==
Huser is a library-consultant-turned-author whose books have gained recognition and awards. His first novel Grace Lake (published in 1989 by NeWest Press), developed from an Edmonton Journal prize-winning play and was nominated for the W.H Smith/Books in Canada First Novel Award. His second novel, Touch of Clown, published by Groundwood in 1998, was awarded a Mr. Christie Silver Medal. Huser's third novel, Jeremy's Christmas Wish, was published in 2001 by Hodgepog. In 2003, Huser wrote the novel Stitches, which in the same year won the Governor General's award presented by Adrienne Clarkson. The book also achieved the Alberta's R.Ross Annett Award. In 2006, Groundwood published Skinnybones and The Wrinkle Queen, which was awarded a Governor General's silver medal. Aside from his novels, Huser has made an impact as the founder and developer of Magpie, an Edmonton Public Schools quarterly that showcased writing and graphics by students.

== Influences ==
Huser reflects: "I'm often so influenced by books I read, books that are powerful and moving, that...I find myself thinking, 'Oh, wouldn't it be great to write something like that.'" Most of Huser's books are written for youth, as he was so interested in children's and young adult literature. Huser's book, Touch of the Clown, is influenced by his own experiences and from old movies he watched.

== Cultural impact ==
Huser's literature resources have been used by teachers everywhere. He has given presentations to many different age groups across the coast and the lower mainland of British Columbia. He has also been involved with writers of all ages in writing and reading workshops. Splitting his time between Alberta and British Columbia, Huser has worked as an instructor in language learning for the University of Alberta and has taught online courses at University of British Columbia in Children's Literature.
