= Xu =

Xu or XU may refer to:

== Surnames ==
- Xu (surname 徐) (徐 Xú)
- Xu (surname 許) (许/許 Xǔ)
- Xu (surname 胥) (胥 Xū)

The tones of these surnames are different in Mandarin, but if the tone diacritics are omitted then each surname would be spelled Xu in pinyin, and Hsü in the Wade–Giles system or Hsu if the diaeresis is also omitted.

== People and characters ==
- ǃXu, a name for the ǃKung group of Bushmen; may also refer to the ǃKung language or the ǃKung people
- ǃXu (god), the creator god of the ǃKung
- Xu, a minor character in the game Final Fantasy VIII

== Places ==
- Xu (state) (徐), a state of ancient China in modern Jiangsu and Anhui
- Xǔ (state) (許), a state of ancient China in modern Henan

== Universities ==
- X University (Toronto Metropolitan University aka Ryerson Polytechnic Institute), Toronto, Ontario, Canada
- Xavier University (disambiguation)
  - Xavier University in Cincinnati, United States
  - Xavier University of Louisiana, United States
- Xiamen University, Xiamen, Fujian, China
- Xinjiang University, Ürümqi, Xinjiang, China

== Astronomy ==
- Xū (虚) or Emptiness, a Chinese constellation
- Xú (徐), the Chinese name of the star Theta Serpentis

== Other uses ==
- African Express Airways (IATA code XU), a Kenyan airline
- X unit (symbol xu), a unit of length approximately equal to 0.1 pm (10^{−13} m), used for X-ray and gamma ray wavelengths
- Xu (currency), a former 1/100 subdivision of the Vietnamese Dong
- XU (intelligence organisation), a clandestine intelligence organisation in occupied Norway during World War II
- PSA XU engine, a series of petrol engines from PSA

== See also ==
- HSU (disambiguation)
