= Sourav Sikdar =

Indian politician (born 1978)

Member of West Bengal Legislative Assembly for Dum Dum North
- Incumbent
- Assumed office 4 May 2026
- Preceded by: Chandrima Bhattacharya (TMC)

Personal details
- Born: 1978 (age 47–48)
- Party: Bharatiya Janata Party
- Relations: Tapan Sikdar (paternal-uncle)
- Education: University of Calcutta (B.Com)
- Occupation: Politician, businessman

Sourav Sikdar is an Indian politician who is serving as a member of West Bengal Legislative Assembly from Dum Dum North constituency since 2026. He is the state party spokesperson of Bharatiya Janata Party, West Bengal.

== Early life and family ==
Sikdar was born on 1978. He is the nephew of Tapan Sikdar who served as Union Minister during the tenure of Prime Minister Atal Bihari Vajpayee, and State BJP president. He has done his undergraduate degree on Bachelor of Commerce in University of Calcutta at 1999.

== Political career ==
He joined as BJP in late 2000s. He won in Dum Dum Uttar Assembly constituency in 2026 election from Chandrima Bhattacharya by a margin of 26,404 votes.

== Social activities ==
He was elected as the Secretary of Suruchi Sangha club.
