= Chandrima Bhattacharya =

Indian politician

State President of West Bengal Trinamool Congress
- In office 5 June 2026 – 4 July 2026
- Preceded by: Subrata Bakshi
- Succeeded by: Mamata Banerjee

Minister of State ''(I/C)'', Government of West Bengal
- In office 2021–2026
- Governor: Jagdeep Dhankhar; La. Ganesan (additional charge); C. V. Ananda Bose; R. N. Ravi
- Department: Finance (I/C)
- Chief Minister: Mamata Banerjee
- Preceded by: Amit Mitra
- Succeeded by: Swapan Dasgupta

Member of the West Bengal Legislative Assembly
- In office 2 May 2021 – 7 May 2026
- Preceded by: Tanmoy Bhattacharya
- Succeeded by: Sourav Sikdar
- Constituency: Dum Dum Uttar
- In office 19 November 2016 – 2 May 2021
- Preceded by: Dibyendu Adhikari
- Succeeded by: Arup Kumar Das
- Constituency: Kanthi Dakshin
- In office 14 May 2011 – 20 May 2016
- Preceded by: Constituency established
- Succeeded by: Tanmoy Bhattacharya
- Constituency: Dum Dum Uttar

Minister of State of the Government of West Bengal
- In office 2012–2026
- Governor: M. K. Narayanan; D. Y. Patil (additional charge) Keshari Nath Tripathi; Jagdeep Dhankhar; La. Ganesan (additional charge); C. V. Ananda Bose; R. N. Ravi: Health and Family Welfare (MoS); Land and Land Reforms (MoS); Refugee and Rehabilitation (MoS)

Personal details
- Born: 5 December 1955 (age 70)
- Party: Trinamool Congress
- Profession: Politician

Chandrima Bhattacharya is an Trinamool Congress politician in India and President of All India Trinamool Congress, West Bengal. She was the former Minister of State for Finance (Independent Charge), Health and Family Welfare, Land and Land Reforms, Refugee and Rehabilitation of the Government of West Bengal. Previously, she acted as a minister in the first reshuffle of the ministry in January 2012 after Mamata Banerjee took over as Chief Minister. She was also made the junior Law Minister in October 2012. She was promoted as a cabinet minister and given independent charge of Law and Judicial Department, Government of West Bengal in November 2012.

Bhattacharya holds an LL.B (1976) degree from the University of Calcutta. She was also a practising advocate in Calcutta High Court till the 2011 elections.

She had been elected a Member of the Legislative Assembly on an Trinamool Congress ticket from Dum Dum Uttar in 2011 and 2021 and from Kanthi Dakshin in 2017.

West Bengal Legislative Assembly
New seat	Member of the West Bengal Legislative Assembly from Dum Dum Uttar Assembly constituency 2011 – 2016	Succeeded by Tanmoy Bhattacharya
Preceded by Dibyendu Adhikari	Member of the West Bengal Legislative Assembly from Kanthi Dakshin Assembly constituency 2017 – 2021	Succeeded by Arup Kumar Das
Preceded by Tanmoy Bhattacharya	Member of the West Bengal Legislative Assembly from Dum Dum Uttar Assembly constituency 2017 -	Incumbent
Preceded by Vacant	Minister of State (Independent Charge); Government of West Bengal; 2012 -	Succeeded by Incumbent
