= Xavier University (disambiguation) =

Xavier University is a private university in Ohio, United States.

Xavier University may also refer to:

- Xavier University of Louisiana, in New Orleans
- Xavier University – Ateneo de Cagayan, in Cagayan de Oro, Philippines
- XIM University, formerly Xavier University, in Bhubaneswar, Odisha, India
- Xavier University School of Medicine, in Oranjestad, Aruba
- St. Francis Xavier University, in Canada
- X-Mansion, a fictional school in X-Men founded by Charles Francis Xavier

== See also ==
- Saint Xavier University, a coeducational institution in Chicago, Illinois
- List of schools named after Francis Xavier for a more comprehensive list of similarly named schools
- XU (disambiguation)
