= HSU =

HSU or Hsu may refer to:

== Surname ==
Chinese surnames romanized Hsü in the Wade-Giles system:

- Xu (surname 徐) (徐 Xú)
- Xu (surname 許) (许/許 Xǔ)
- Xu (surname 胥) (胥 Xū)

== Universities ==
- Hakim Sabzevari University in Sabzevar, Iran
- Hang Seng University of Hong Kong in Hong Kong, China
- Hardin–Simmons University in Abilene, Texas, United States
- Health Sciences University (Bournemouth, UK)
- Helmut Schmidt University in Hamburg, Germany
- Henderson State University in Arkadelphia, Arkansas, United States
- Humboldt State University, former name of California State Polytechnic University, Humboldt in Arcata, California, United States
- Penn State Harrisburg in Middletown, Dauphin County, Pennsylvania, United States
- Hansung University in Seoul, South Korea

== Other uses ==
- Croatian Party of Pensioners (Hrvatska stranka umirovljenika), a political party
- Health Services Union, an Australian trade union
- High Security Unit, a closed prison in Lexington, Kentucky, United States

== See also ==
- Xu (disambiguation)
