= St. Francis Xavier School, Burgos =

Coordinates: 42°20′24.72″N 3°41′21.91″W

- La Merced y San Francisco Javier
- Burgos, Spain

Information
- Type: Jesuit, Catholic
- Established: 1956; 70 years ago
- Director: Javier Pérez de la Canal, SJ
- Headmaster: José Luis López Ruiz
- Grades: Pre-K to baccalaureate
- Gender: Coeducational
- Publication: Nuestro Patio (Our Schoolyard)
- Website: St. Francis Xavier School

St. Francis Xavier School, Burgos (La Merced y San Francisco Javier) in northwest Spain was founded by the Jesuits in 1956. It covers pre-kindergarten through baccalaureate and includes a technical training division.

Vocational Training includes academic degrees in Administration, Commerce and Marketing, Carpentry and Furniture, Computer Science and Electricity – Electronics in Middle Degree, Higher Degree or Basic FP, according to specialties.

== See also ==
- List of Jesuit sites
