= ǃXu =

Main god of San people

ǃXu, also ǃXu꞉ba and sometimes ǃXo or ǃXo꞉ba, is a San rendering of the Khoikhoi word ǃKhu 'rich' and its derivation ǃKhub 'rich man, master', which was used by some Christian missionaries to the Khoikhoi to translate the word "Lord" in the Bible. Bleek reports that the ǂKxʼaoǁʼae rendered the word as ǃXo and the Naro as ǃXu꞉ba or ǃXo꞉ba when repeating things what the Khoikhoi had told them. It has entered the Juǀʼhoan language as the name of the Christian god.

Xu, a crater on Rhea, the second largest moon of Saturn, is named for ǃXu as the supposed "Bushman" Creator.

== See also ==
- San religion
