= Xavier College, Santiago de Compostela =

Xavier College
- Spanish: Colegio San Francisco Javier

Location
- Virgen de la Cerca; Santiago de Compostela, Galicia; Spain
- Coordinates: 42°52′43″N 8°32′27″W

Information
- Type: Private
- Religious affiliation: Catholicism
- Denomination: Jesuit
- Patron saint: Francis Xavier
- Established: 1961; 65 years ago
- Gender: Co-educational
- Website: www.csfjesuitas.com

Xavier College (Spanish: Colegio San Francisco Javier), is a private Catholic primary and secondary school, located in Santiago de Compostela, Galicia, Spain. The school was established by the Society of Jesus in 1961, and is situated in the center of the historic pilgrimage town of northwestern Spain.

The School closed In September 2018.

== See also ==
- Catholic Church in Spain
- Education in Spain
- List of Jesuit schools
