= Xavier College, Panama =

School in Panama City, Panama

- Spanish: Colegio Javier

Location
- Demetrio B. Lakas St., Clayton Panama City; Panama
- Coordinates: 9°0′19″N 79°33′38″W

Information
- Type: Private primary and secondary school
- Motto: Spanish: En todo amar y servir (To love and serve in everything)
- Religious affiliation: Catholicism
- Denomination: Jesuits
- Patron saint: Francis Xavier
- Established: 1594; 432 years ago
- Founder: Society of Jesus
- Rector: Jose Maria Andres
- Pastoral Director: Elizabeth Pineda
- Academic Director: Orlando Castillo
- Faculty: 121
- Enrollment: 2,322
- Campus: Suburban
- Sports: Basketball, football, soccer, swimming, athletics
- Nickname: Javeriana
- Affiliations: Association of Jesuit Colleges of Central America; Federación Latinoamericana de Colegios Jesuitas; Sports Association of Private Schools; Football League of Catholic Schools in Panama
- Website: https://javier.edu

Xavier College, Panama, (Spanish: Colegio Javier) is a private Catholic primary and secondary school, located in a suburb of Panama City, Panama. The school traces its current presence to 1948. It is coeducational, pre-primary through high school, and is run by the Society of Jesus.

== Notable alumni ==
- Juan Carlos Varela - president
- Stanley Heckadon Moreno - conservationist

== See also ==
- List of Jesuit schools
- Education in Panama
