= Dum Dum Uttar Assembly constituency =

Dum Dum Uttar
- Constituency No. 110 for the West Bengal Legislative Assembly
- Interactive Map Outlining Dum Dum Uttar Assembly Constituency

Constituency details
- Country: India
- Region: East India
- State: West Bengal
- District: North 24 Parganas
- Lok Sabha constituency: Dum Dum
- Established: 2011
- Total electors: 256,352
- Reservation: None

Member of Legislative Assembly
- 18th West Bengal Legislative Assembly
- Incumbent Sourav Sikdar
- Party: Bharatiya Janata Party
- Elected year: 2026

Dum Dum Uttar Assembly constituency is a Legislative Assembly constituency of North 24 Parganas district in the Indian state of West Bengal.

== Overview ==
As per orders of the Delimitation Commission, No. 110 Dum Dum Uttar Assembly constituency is composed of the following: North Dum Dum Municipality and New Barrackpur Municipality.

Dum Dum Uttar Assembly constituency is part of No. 16 Dum Dum (Lok Sabha constituency).

== Members of the Legislative Assembly ==
| Year | Name | Party |
|---|---|---|
| 2011 | Chandrima Bhattacharya | Trinamool Congress |
| 2016 | Tanmoy Bhattacharya | Communist Party of India (Marxist) |
| 2021 | Chandrima Bhattacharya | Trinamool Congress |
| 2026 | Sourav Sikdar | Bharatiya Janata Party |

== Election results ==
=== 2026 ===
2026 West Bengal Legislative Assembly election: Dum Dum Uttar
| Party | Candidate | Votes | % | ±% |
|---|---|---|---|---|
| BJP | Sourav Sikdar | 103,284 | 46.24 | ▲14.82 |
| AITC | Chandrima Bhattacharya | 76,880 | 34.42 | ▼10.37 |
| CPI(M) | Dipsita Dhar | 38,428 | 17.21 | ▼4.24 |
| NOTA | None of the above | 1,475 | 0.66 | ▼0.33 |
| Majority | | 26,404 | 11.82 | ▼1.55 |
| Turnout | | 223,349 | 92.87 | ▲14.8 |
| BJP gain from AITC | | Swing | ▲14.82 | |

=== 2021 ===
2021 West Bengal Legislative Assembly election: Dum Dum Uttar
| Party | Candidate | Votes | % | ±% |
|---|---|---|---|---|
| AITC | Chandrima Bhattacharya | 95,465 | 44.79 | |
| BJP | Archana Majumdar | 66,966 | 31.42 | |
| CPI(M) | Tanmoy Bhattacharya | 45,728 | 21.45 | |
| NOTA | None of the above | 2,111 | 0.99 | |
| Majority | | 28,499 | 13.37 | |
| Turnout | | 213,149 | 78.07 | |
| AITC gain from CPI(M) | | Swing | | |

=== 2016 ===
2016 West Bengal Legislative Assembly election: Dum Dum Uttar
| Party | Candidate | Votes | % | ±% |
|---|---|---|---|---|
| CPI(M) | Tanmoy Bhattacharya | 91,959 | 46.38 | +3.69 |
| AITC | Chandrima Bhattacharya | 85,410 | 43.08 | −10.35 |
| BJP | Tapan Chandra Das | 15,420 | 7.77 | +5.09 |
| BSP | Sova Howlader | 1,947 | 0.98 | −0.22 |
| NOTA | None of the above | 3,518 | 1.77 | N/A |
| Majority | | 6,549 | 3.30 | −7.44 |
| Turnout | | 1,98,255 | 82.57 | |
| CPI(M) gain from AITC | | Swing | +7.02 | |

=== 2011 ===
In the 2011 election, Chandrima Bhattacharjee of Trinamool Congress defeated her nearest rival Rekha Goswami of CPI(M).

2011 West Bengal Legislative Assembly election: Dum Dum Uttar
| Party | Candidate | Votes | % | ±% |
|---|---|---|---|---|
| AITC | Chandrima Bhattacharya | 94,678 | 53.43 | |
| CPI(M) | Rekha Goswami | 75,650 | 42.69 | |
| BJP | Chandan Roy | 4,741 | 2.68 | |
| BSP | Naresh Chandra Barui | 2,144 | 1.20 | |
| Majority | | 19,026 | 10.74 | |
| Turnout | | 1,77,320 | 86.82 | |
| AITC win (new seat) | | | | |

== See also ==
- List of constituencies of the West Bengal Legislative Assembly
