= Xavier College, Madagascar =

Xavier College, Madagascar Kolejy Md François Xavier

Location
- Fianarantsoa; Madagascar
- Coordinates: 21°26′53″S 47°05′05″E

Information
- Type: Private secondary school
- Motto: Truth and courage
- Religious affiliation(s): Catholicism
- Denomination: Jesuits
- Patron saint(s): Francis Xavier
- Established: 1952; 73 years ago
- Rector: Pierre André Ranaivoarson
- Gender: Coeducational
- Website: sites.google.com/site/sfxfianarana/wiki-sfx-fianara

Xavier College, Madagascar is a private Catholic secondary school, located in Fianarantsoa, Madagascar, an island nation off the east coast of Africa. The school was opened by the Jesuits in 1952.

== See also ==
- Catholic Church in Madagascar
- Education in Madagascar
- List of Jesuit schools
