= Xavier High School (Massachusetts) =

Closed Jesuit high school in Concord, Massachusetts

Location
- Concord, Massachusetts 01742; United States
- Coordinates: 42.4539619°N 71.3737237°W

Information
- Religious affiliation: Society of Jesus
- Established: 1962; 63 years ago
- Founder: Jesuits of the New England Province
- Closed: 1971; 54 years ago
- Grades: 9–12
- Gender: Male
- Capacity: 1,200 students
- Classrooms: 35
- Campus size: 17 acres (6.9 ha)

Xavier High School was a private all-boys college preparatory Catholic high school in Concord, Massachusetts which operated from 1962 to 1971.

== History ==
The school was located along the Concord Turnpike section of Massachusetts Route 2 in Concord, on the Old Road to Nine Acre Corner, between Route 2 and Massachusetts Route 62, and was built at a cost of $3 million. The building was a 3-story building with 35 classrooms and while the school was originally planned to accommodate up to 1,200 students, it never became that large. The total enrollment for the 1965–1966 school year, for example, was 401. The first graduating class in 1966, who attended Xavier High School for all four years, consisted of 87 graduates. The final graduating class before the school's closure in 1971 consisted of 91 graduates.

The all-boys school had required entrance exams for incoming freshmen.

The auditorium had a seating capacity of 1,300, making it the largest space for indoor gatherings in the city of Concord at the time. Because of this, the school's auditorium was used for non-school activities, especially when the smaller Concord High School auditorium was insufficient. These programs included adult education lectures and group psychotherapy sessions, ecumenical services, Pi Lambda Theta conferences, science congresses, concerts, and orchestra events.

=== Closure ===
The Jesuit priests who ran the school made a decision in 1970 to close the school the following year in 1971, blaming a decline in enrollment, rising costs and a shortage of religious teachers. The headmaster, Rev. John R Vigneau, said there had been "a gnawing doubt which over the years became a conviction that we are not fulfilling service for the greater good of God's people at Xavier."

The closure reflected a shifting viewpoint and re-evaluation in the Jesuit order concerning the best way to teach the highest number of people in the most effective way. The headmaster Rev. Vigneau said "we do not reject you but we sincerely have tried to raise the basic question of whether we can serve God best here or elsewhere and the answer for some of us...whispers back that there are other more demanding needs."

=== After closing ===
The Concord-Carlisle Regional School District briefly considered purchasing the school for use as a school within their own school system, but ultimately rejected this idea as it would have required expensive renovation because the building itself did not meet the school district's educational specifications.

Instead the plot of land was rezoned for commercial use and sold to the Minuteman Companies, an insurance company whose headquarters had been in Concord since the mid-1800s.

The town briefly used the school's large auditorium for town meetings after the school closed in 1971 and continued using it after it was purchased by the Minutemen Companies.

== Extracurricular activities ==
Xavier High School had sports programs including soccer, cross country, hockey, basketball, and baseball, as well as a chess club, a theatre program, and community outreach volunteer work.

The school participated in a series of debate tournaments among Catholic high schools organized by the Catholic Youth Organization, and students also were involved in overseas trips to locations including France, England, and Germany.

== Notable alumni ==
- Ethan Anthony, American architect, author, and academic
