= St. Francis Xavier School, Vancouver =

St. Francis Xavier School

Location
- 428 Great Northern Way; Vancouver, British Columbia, V5T 4S5; Canada; 49.2666°N 123.0951°W

Information
- School type: Independent
- Motto: Initium Sapientiae (The beginning of wisdom)
- Religious affiliation: Roman Catholic
- Founded: 1933
- School board: CISVA (Catholic Independent Schools of the Vancouver Archdiocese)
- Superintendent: Mr. Doug Lauson
- Area trustee: Rev. John Thu Tran, CSJB
- School number: 604-254-2714
- Principal: Ms. Cathy Lorenz
- Grades: PreK–7 (co-ed)
- Enrollment: 442 (2025)
- Language: English
- Area: Mt. Pleasant
- Colours: Blue and White
- Mascot: Dragons
- Team name: SFX Dragons
- Website: sfxschool.ca

St. Francis Xavier School (a.k.a. S.F.X.) is an independent Catholic school of the Vancouver Archdiocese. S.F.X. was ranked number one in "Report Card on British Columbia’s Elementary Schools" by the Fraser Institute in the 2008 edition. The school is a dual-stream elementary school, established by St. Francis Xavier Parish in 1933, and it follows the policies and procedures recommended by the CISVA (Catholic Independent Schools of the Vancouver Archdiocese). The school enrolment consists of 440 students with a class size of approximately 28 students. St. Francis Xavier School offers education from kindergarten through to Grade 7. The school was originally located near Chinatown but is now located north of Mount Pleasant. The current principal is Cathy Lorenz.

== Independent school status ==
St. Francis Xavier School is classified as a Group 1 school under British Columbia's Independent School Act. Schools in this category receive partial funding from the Ministry of Education. As of 2006 that consists of 50% of their local school districts per student operating grant based on full-time equivalent (FTE) student basis. Under the act, the school has the "freedom to approach the curriculum from their own perspectives." However, Group 1 schools must:

"...employ BC certified teachers, have educational programs consistent with ministerial orders, provide a program that meets the learning outcomes of the British Columbia curriculum, meet various administrative requirements, maintain adequate educational facilities, and comply with municipal and regional district codes."

The school receives no funding for capital costs.

== Pastory ==
The Grey Sisters of the Immaculate Conception from Pembroke, Ontario, founded St. Francis Xavier School in 1933. From a donation, a house and land was purchased at the corner of Georgia Street and Princess Avenue in Chinatown.

A kindergarten was opened in one of the rooms of the house. The first class consisted of 30 kindergarten students. The kindergarten was moved to another building across the street in 1934. The grade school started in 1938, housed in three rented classrooms on the third storey of a bank building situated at the corner of Main and East Pender Street in Vancouver. There were three grades in each classroom with a total enrolment of 30. In 1940, the first school building, located at the corner of East Georgia Street and Princess Avenue, was constructed to accommodate about 70 students.

Over the years, the school population had outgrown the school building to such an extent that more than half of the students had to be housed in various rented buildings. Another building was acquired on East Pender Street. The parish and school fundraised for 20 years to build a new school. The construction took two years to complete. In 2001, the school building at 428 Great Northern Way was completed. Operations began in September 2001. Adam Exner, OMI, Archbishop of Vancouver, blessed the new school on December 2, 2001. The school has 16 classrooms.

== Principals ==
19__–2001 : Ms. Therese Leung

2003–2009 : Ms. Brenda Krivuzoff

2009–2018: Mr. Brian Fader

2018-2019: Ms. Anne Yam

2019-2023: Mr. Brian Fader

2024-2026: Ms. Anne Yam

Present: Ms. Cathy Lorenz

== Uniform ==
All students are required to wear full uniform at all times excluding special occasions. Inside the school building, outerwear is not permitted to be worn over the uniform. The female uniform consists of a plaid kilt, Oxford white crested shirt, navy crested pullover, navy socks, and black shoes. The male uniform consists of twill navy pants, Oxford white crested shirt, navy crested pullover, navy socks, and black shoes. The P.E. uniform consists of shorts, T-shirt, and non-marking running shoes.

== Children Helping Children ==
In September 2004, a call for help was expressed to SFX school. Immediately, administration, teachers, and students offered to help in meeting that need. The need was to help homeless African children, the same ages as St. Francis Xavier students. The first of many, many Spirit Days for Amani (Peace in Swahili) took place that November. With ongoing support from SFX and other committed donors, the dream of building a home and school for the Amani children was realized. On April 28, 2007, the Amani children spent their first night in their new home in Moshi, Kilimanjaro, Tanzania. The Amani house grew in the number of children from 16 in 2001 to over 200 by 2007. In addition to providing a new home, the money from St. Francis Xavier School helped provide the children with physical rehabilitation, emotional counseling, and basic education.

St. Francis Xavier School also sells Fair Trade Certified Chocolates to help farmers get fair wages.

== Spirit Days ==
A theme is selected by the SFX Leadership group each month and the school population is invited to show their school spirit through their participation. Themes have included pajama day, crazy hair day and fall colors day. Students must donate $2.00 to participate, with all proceeds being donated to local and international charities.

== Events and performances ==
St. Francis Xavier runs a series of events throughout the year. In 2014, the school put on a production of Mulan. In January 2018, the school hosted the relic of St. Francis Xavier. The 460 year old section of the arm was on a tour across Canada when it made a stop at the school for a special Wednesday mass, run by the grade 7 students. Several hundred people participated at the mass in veneration.

Every May, the school also runs a fundraising Bazaar on a Saturday. Inside the school gym, students from each class perform songs in a 'Singathon' throughout the day, while parents, alumni, and parish members gather for the auction market, food, and game stalls.

The school released their first CD project, SFX Forever, on December 15, 2004 at AMANI NOEL, a primary Christmas presentation. All profits from the CD went to support the Amani Centre.

== Sports ==
Saint Francis Xavier has teams for the following sports:

- Soccer
- Volleyball
- Basketball
- Badminton
- Track and Field
- Cross Country Running
- Frisbee
- American football

== Clubs ==
- Young Authors Club
- Prayer Group
- Craft Club
- Drawing Club
- Green Club
- Leadership Group (Grade 7s only)
- Social Justice Group (grades K–7)
- Library Club (grades 5–7)
- Yearbook (Grade 7s only)

== Chinese Culture ==
The school has long had close ties to the Chinese community. The population of the school has often had a Chinese majority, leading the school to adopt daily Mandarin classes along with the provincial curriculum designated French classes. Thus, students experience the Mandarin language from kindergarten to grade 7. Additionally, the school offers an after school Chinese program from 3:30PM to 5PM. Students also learn about important Chinese cultural events, such as Mid-Autumn festival and Chinese New Year. Each year on Chinese New Year, intermediate students have calligraphy workshops with their Mandarin teacher, while all grades prepare performances for the Chinese New Year schoolwide event.

== Notable alumni ==
Clayton

== Awards ==
Garfield Weston Awards for Excellence in Education:

- 2008– Determination of Academic Achievement, 2nd Runner Up
