= List of schools in Brazil =

This is a list of primary and secondary schools located in the South American country of Brazil. The list is organized by region. Tertiary schools are presented separately on the list of universities in Brazil by state.

== Central-West ==
- School of the Nations (Escola das Nações), Lago Sul

=== Brasília ===
- American School of Brasília
- Brasilia International School
- Colégio Militar de Brasília
- Lycée Français François Mitterrand
- SIS Swiss International School Brasília

== North ==
- Amazon Valley Academy, Ananindeua
- The Children's Village at the Canuanã School, Formoso do Araguaia
- Japanese School of Manaus, Manaus

== Northeast ==
- American School of Recife, Recife
- Bona Espero, Alto Paraíso de Goiás
- Diocesan College, Teresina
- St. Alphonsus Rodriguez School, Teresina
- St. Ignatius College, Fortaleza

=== Salvador ===
- Antonio Vieira College
- Casa Pia and College of the Orphans of Saint Joachim
- Colégio 2 de Julho
- Pan American School of Bahia

== South ==
- Anchieta College, Porto Alegre
- Colégio Centenário, Santa Maria
- Colégio Farroupilha, Porto Alegre
- Colégio La Salle Carmo, Caxias do Sul
- Colegio Marista Pio XII, Ponta Grossa
- Colégio Suíço-Brasileiro de Curitiba, Pinhais
- College of Our Lady Mediatrix, Curitiba
- Escola Estadual de Educação Básica Frei Casimiro Zaffonato, Ipê
- International School of Curitiba, Curitiba
- Pan American School of Porto Alegre, Porto Alegre
- Saint Catherine College, Florianópolis

== Southeast ==
- Anchieta College, Nova Friburgo
- Colégio Culto à Ciência, Campinas
- Dr. Álvaro Guião State School, São Carlos
- ETEC Lauro Gomes, São Bernardo do Campo
- FMC Electronic Technical School, Santa Rita do Sapucai
- International School of Macaé, Macaé
- Jesuit College, Juiz de Fora

=== Belo Horizonte ===
- American School of Belo Horizonte
- Colégio Marista Dom Silvério
- Colégio Santo Antônio
- Istituto Italo-Brasiliano Biculturale Fondazione Torino
- St. John's Academy

=== Coronel Fabriciano ===
- Colégio Angélica
- Professor Pedro Calmon State School

=== Rio de Janeiro ===
- American School of Rio de Janeiro (Escola Americana do Rio de Janeiro)
- The British School of Rio de Janeiro
- International Center for Integrated Education (Centro Internacional de Educação Integrada)
- Colégio de Aplicação da UFRJ
- Colégio de São Bento
- Colégio Pedro II
- Deutsche Schule Rio de Janeiro, German school
- Escola Suíço-Brasileira Rio de Janeiro
- Lycée Molière de Rio de Janeiro, French school
- Our Lady of Mercy School
- St. Ignatius College, Rio de Janeiro

=== São Paulo ===
- Associação Escola Graduada de São Paulo (also known as the Graded School)
- Colégio Bandeirantes de São Paulo
- Colégio Campos Salles
- Colégio Dante Alighieri
- Colégio Humboldt São Paulo
- Colégio Marista Arquidiocesano
- Colégio Miguel de Cervantes, Spanish school
- Colégio Santa Cruz
- Colégio Santa Maria
- Colégio Visconde de Porto Seguro, German school founded in 1878
- Escola Japonesa de São Paulo, Japanese school
- Lycée Pasteur de São Paulo
- Pan American Christian Academy, American school
- St. Francis Xavier College
- St. Louis College
- St Paul's School, British school
- Scuola Italiana Eugenio Montale, Italian school

== See also ==
- Education in Brazil
- Lists of schools
