= Anchieta College =

Anchieta College may refer to:

- Anchieta College (Nova Friburgo), Rio de Janeiro, Brazil
- Anchieta College (Porto Alegre), Rio Grande do Sul, Brazil
