= Frei Casimiro Zaffonato =

Brazilian Catholic priest and educator

- Official name: Ernesto Zaffonato

Personal life
- Born: August 12, 1912 Antônio Prado, Rio Grande do Sul, Brazil
- Died: June 11, 1988 Pompéia Hospital, Caxias do Sul
- Occupation: Priest

Religious life
- Religion: Catholic

Ernesto Zaffonato or Frei Casimiro Zaffonato (August 12, 1912 – June 11, 1988, Antônio Prado, Rio Grande do Sul, Brazil) was a Brazilian Catholic priest and educator, recognized for his contributions to education and community development in Ipê, Rio Grande do Sul.

== Biography ==
Ernesto Zaffonato was born in Antônio Prado on August 12, 1912. He entered religious life in 1929, professing his religious vows at the Sacred Heart of Jesus Convent in Flores da Cunha. In 1937, he was ordained a priest by Bishop Frei Cândido Maria Bampi.

Frei Casimiro became a significant figure for Ipê, where he served as Parish Priest for 23 years, starting in 1964, at the Mother Church. In the mid-1960s, recognizing the need for educational facilities, Frei Casimiro was one of the main proponents of founding the Vila Ipê State Gymnasium. With determination and community support, he mobilized resources and efforts for the construction of the educational institution, which later, in 2001, was renamed Escola Estadual de Educação Básica Frei Casimiro Zaffonato, in honor of his legacy with the institution.

In addition to his religious work, Frei Casimiro played a role in the emancipation of the municipality of Ipê, serving as vice-president of the Emancipation Commission formed in 1985. The school that bears his name is the only one offering high school education in the region, currently serving hundreds of students from Ipê.

=== Death ===
Frei Casimiro Zaffonato died at the age of 76 at the Pompéia Hospital in Caxias do Sul and was buried in the public cemetery of Ipê.
