= Padre Arrupe School =

Coordinates: 5°11′19.38″S 42°44′49.83″W

- Established: 2003; 23 years ago
- Type: Ages two through six
- Location: Rua Pe. Cláudio, 24 Residencial Mestre Dezinho, Porto Alegre, Teresina, Piauí, Brazil
- Parent organization: Antônio Vieira Association
- Affiliations: Jesuit, Catholic
- Website: ArrupeTeresina

Padre Arrupe School is a school of the Society of Jesus through its society Antônio Vieira Association, in Teresina, Brazil. It offers education to socially vulnerable children between the ages of two and six.

== History ==
In 1989, the Jesuit-run Diocesan College extended its outreach to settlers in the Favela da Prainha, Teresina (PI). This led to the founding of the "Pedro Arrupe Social Center", which provided assistance to children, youth and adults.

In 2003 the work had grown that there was need for a larger school facility. The charity Padre Pedro Arrupe Maternal and Child School (EMIPA) was set up in the Portal da Alegria region of about 15 neighborhoods.

The school accommodates 400 children, ages two to five years, from low-income families. Since July 2011 it is being assisted by the NGO National Association of Instruction (ANI). In 2015, the "Antônio Vieira Association" adopted the school and the first year of elementary school was added to the program. The school also took on the shortened name, Padre Arrupe School.
