= Inatel =

Brazilian research institute

Instituto Nacional de Telecomunicações
- Motto: Construir para a Engenharia Humana (Portuguese)
- Motto in English: Train Humanity in Engineering
- Established: 1965
- President: Marcelo de Oliveira Marques
- Location: Santa Rita do Sapucaí, Minas Gerais, Brazil; 22°15′26″S 45°41′46″W
- Campus: Urban, 75,000 m^{2}
- Website: http://www.inatel.br

Inatel is short for Instituto Nacional de Telecomunicações, the National Institute of Communications of Brazil. The Institute is located on a 75,000 m^{2} campus in Santa Rita do Sapucaí in southern Minas Gerais. Founded in 1965, it specializes in Electrical Engineering and Telecommunications education and research.

As of 2007, Inatel's monthly tuition was 950 reais, and about 5,000 students had graduated from the school.

The Institute sponsors the biennial International Workshop on Telecommunications held in odd-numbered years in Rio de Janeiro.

Researchers at Inatel publish and review technical papers for international conferences.

== See also ==
- List of universities in Brazil
