= St. Alphonsus Rodriguez School =

- Portuguese: Escola Santo Afonso Rodriguez

Location
- Av Kennedy, 9000, Socopo; Teresina; Piauí; Brazil
- Coordinates: 5°0′19.1″S 42°45′37.97″W

Information
- Type: Private primary and secondary school
- Religious affiliation: Catholic
- Denomination: Jesuit
- Established: 1963 (63 years ago)
- Rector: Raimundo Barros
- Director: Sunday Mianulli
- Staff: 71
- Gender: Co-educational
- Enrollment: 766
- Website: St. Alphonsus Rodriguez School

St. Alphonsus Rodriguez School (ESAR) (Portuguese: Escola Santo Afonso Rodriguez) is a private Catholic school in Teresina, Piauí, Brazil. It was established by the Jesuits in 1963 and opened in 1965. It covers elementary through high school and includes technical courses.

The school started with 105 students. Since this was a rural area, it began as an agricultural school but with urbanization it grew into an elementary school and high school.

== See also ==
- Catholic Church in Brazil
- Education in Brazil
- List of Jesuit educational institutions
- List of schools in Brazil
