= João Meneguzzi =

Brazilian Catholic priest

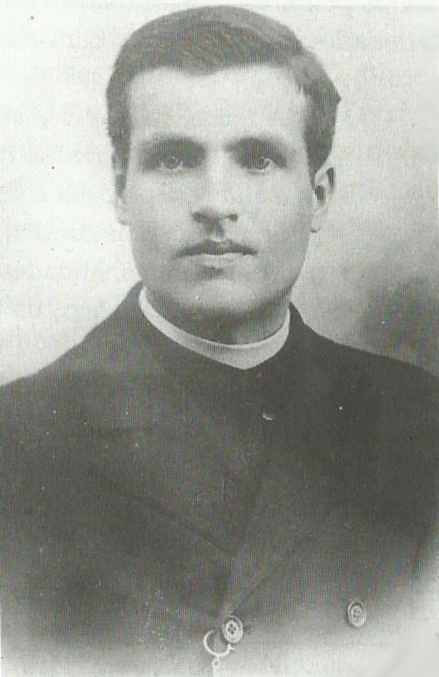
- Born: November 19, 1883; Caxias do Sul
- Died: December 14, 1965 (aged 82)
- Occupation: Priest

João Meneguzzi (Caxias do Sul, November 19, 1883 - Caxias do Sul, December 14, 1965) was a Brazilian Catholic priest. He was canon and vicar of the Mother Church of Caxias do Sul (later Cathedral), and a figure of great projection and influence in the community in the religious, social, cultural, political, and educational fields.

== Biography ==
João was the son of Andrea Meneguzzi and Angela da Ros and his brothers were Francisco and Natal. He did his preparation at the Episcopal Seminary in Porto Alegre, being ordained on November 30, 1908, by Archbishop Cláudio Ponce de Leão. He worked in the parish of Alegrete, where he remained for three years. On his departure, on July 12, 1911, he was honored with a great party; the newspaper A Federação mentions that he was highly esteemed.

João took over the parish of the Mother Church of Caxias on July 16, 1943, governing it until July 11, 1943. Before the creation of the Diocese and the fragmentation of the parish, he was in charge of 45 other chapels in the neighborhoods and rural areas. In August 1921, he was named canon in Porto Alegre, and was received in Caxias do Sul with a great reception and banquet at the Paternoster Hotel. In 1934, the Diocese was created, and on March 16, 1936, João was appointed diocesan consultant. The next day he was appointed as a member of the Diocesan Congress of Parish Priests, and on April 27, 1942, he was named Vicar General of the Diocese. However, on July 11, 1943, he was replaced in the position of curate of the See, which he had held until then, by Father Ernesto Brandalise. In 1944, he was awarded the title of Domestic Prelate of His Holiness, and on November 19, 1951, upon the death of Bishop José Barea, he was named Vicar of the Chapter, assuming the government of the diocese until his successor, Bishop Benedito Zorzi, took office on December 6, 1952.

== Work ==
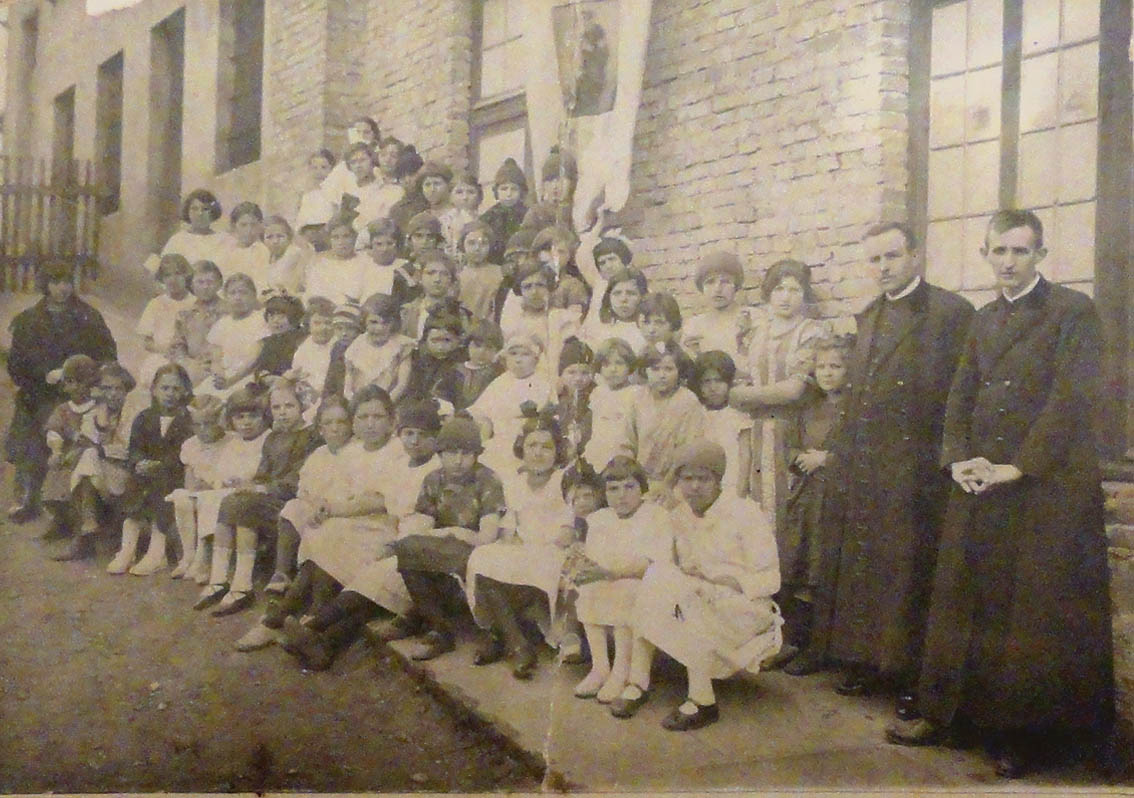
The board and students of the Saint Anthony Parish School, circa 1923. On the far left, in dark clothes, is teacher Zulmira de Paula Pinto, and on the far right are Monsignor João Meneguzzi and Father Edmundo Rambo.

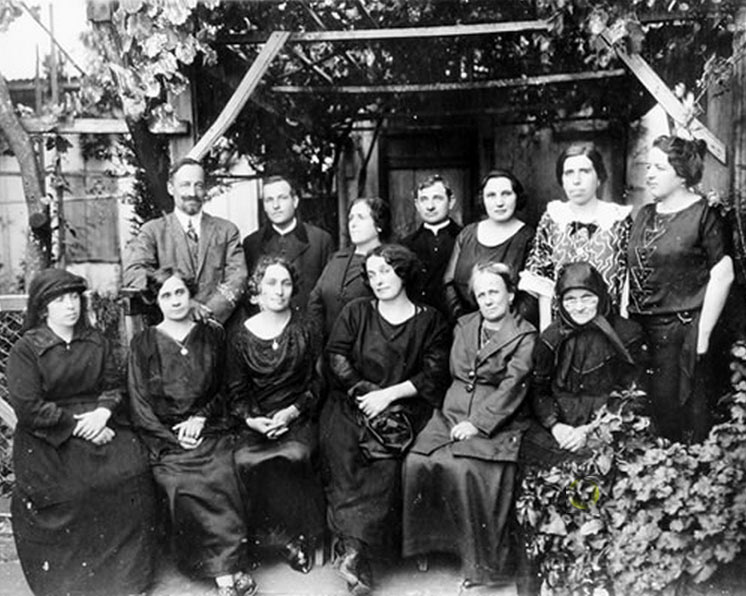
One of the first Board of Directors of the Ladies of Charity. Safely identified, in the back row, standing, were Father João Meneguzzi, the second from left to right, and Santina Amoretti Sartori, the last lady on the right, and in the front row, seated, Amazilia Penna de Moraes, Ignez Parolini Thompson and Teresa Paternoster Rossi, respectively the second, fourth and last from left to right.

João was responsible for the completion of the Mother Church building, especially the facade and the internal decoration, and for the construction of the Canonical House, inaugurated in 1918, one of the most emblematic historical buildings of the city, besides having laid the foundations of the belfry, which was only built in 2007 with a modified project. He created the Apostleship of Prayer, a traditional group for the cultivation of faith, in 1911, established the city's Ecclesiastical District, being its first vicar forane, founded rural chapels, and fundamentally collaborated in the creation and establishment of the Diocese of Caxias do Sul in 1934 as the leader of the Pro-Bishopric Commission, of the Diocesan Seminary, founded in 1937 and inaugurated in 1939, and of the parishes of Holy Sepulcher (1934), Our Lady of Lourdes (1942), and San Pellegrino (1942).

Other charities, schools and cultural groups were also founded because of João. In 1913, he founded the Recreio Dante Society, the first entity to offer nighttime education to young people and workers, with primary school classes and a trade technical course, besides having a library and promoting "instructive and moral" recreational events, such as cinema and theater. In 1922, he created and started directing the Saint Anthony Parish School in the Canonical House, and, at the same time, with the support of the public authorities and the help of Father Edmundo Rambo, he launched a project to create a network of parochial schools to attend the rural zone and the neighborhoods, with the purpose of containing the growth of the Protestant influence in the city. The parochial schools lasted about ten years, and in Miguel Muratore's administration (1930-1935), they were incorporated into the municipal school system. Among these schools, the most prominent were E. P. São Vicente de Paula, E. P. São João Batista de La Salle and E. P. Dom João Becker. In 1924, he participated in a municipal commission for the foundation of the first secondary school in the city. With the collaboration of Angelina Michielon and a special commission, he founded, in 1928, the Santa Teresinha Orphanage, the first in Caxias and predecessor of the Mother Imilda School, remaining as one of its main benefactors.

His role in the history of La Salle Carmo College and São Carlos College, which are still active and among the most traditional in Caxias, is also noteworthy. He supervised the creation of the Vincentian Conferences in 1933, one at the La Salle Carmo College and another at the Chapel of San Pellegrino, which later became the Society of Caxias do Sul for Assistance to the Needy. In 1934, he founded the Círculo Operário Caxiense, a welfare entity of mutual help with a relevant trajectory.

Also under his guidance, the Ladies of Charity Association, a group of ladies from society, was founded in 1913. Its initial goal was to raise funds for the construction of the main altar of the Mother Church, but soon they expanded their activities to dedicate themselves to helping the poor, especially in the area of health, founding the Pompéia Hospital, the first regional hospital in the Italian immigration zone and until today of intense and benevolent performance, while maintaining a philanthropic character. Meneguzzi remained as the Association's Spiritual Director, and in Brandalise's words, "Only God knows how much charity was done. All the directors were tireless and dedicated a large part of their day to the Hospital. [...] Thanks to these Ladies we have, with the support of the ecclesiastic authority, this monument that makes Caxias do Sul proud".

João was chapel master of the Mother Church and left an important contribution in the field of memory and traditions, being the compiler, together with Dom José Barea, of a collection of sacred hymns and popular songs typical of the region. He is the author of the music of the Hymn to Our Lady of Caravaggio, used by devotees in the region, the Hymn of the Home Chapels of the Cathedral Parish, and other sacred melodies.

=== Politics ===
Due to the Church's vast influence over the population and matters of public interest, and his eminent position in the church hierarchy of the region, Meneguzzi naturally ended up getting involved in politics. He was secretary-general of the executive committee of the National Defense League, part of several municipal committees, represented the people in demands before the authorities, and mediated the pacification of several community crises in an era of coronelism and not infrequently violent disputes and confrontations. He participated in a period of local decline of the power of the Republican Party of Rio Grande do Sul (PRR), caused mostly by Catholic influence, and that had generated tensions with the state government, dominated by the PRR since the 19th century, which ended up in losses for the Church, since it depended, for many of its projects, on the approval and support of the civil authorities. The estrangement was very much due to the fact that most PRR politicians were linked to Freemasonry, positivism, and/or liberalism, demonized by the Church, although they shared with these movements a strong concern for education, order, and public morality. Guided by the Porto Alegre high clergy to pursue a rapprochement with the public power, he developed a policy of understanding and mutual help. In the words of Eliana Rela, "a man with a broad political vision, he knew the paths that led the Church to get closer to the fundamental groups and, at the same time, he knew the paths that led it away from the dominant group, as it had happened in the first phase of the process, contradicting the standard positioning of the Catholicism of Rio Grande do Sul".

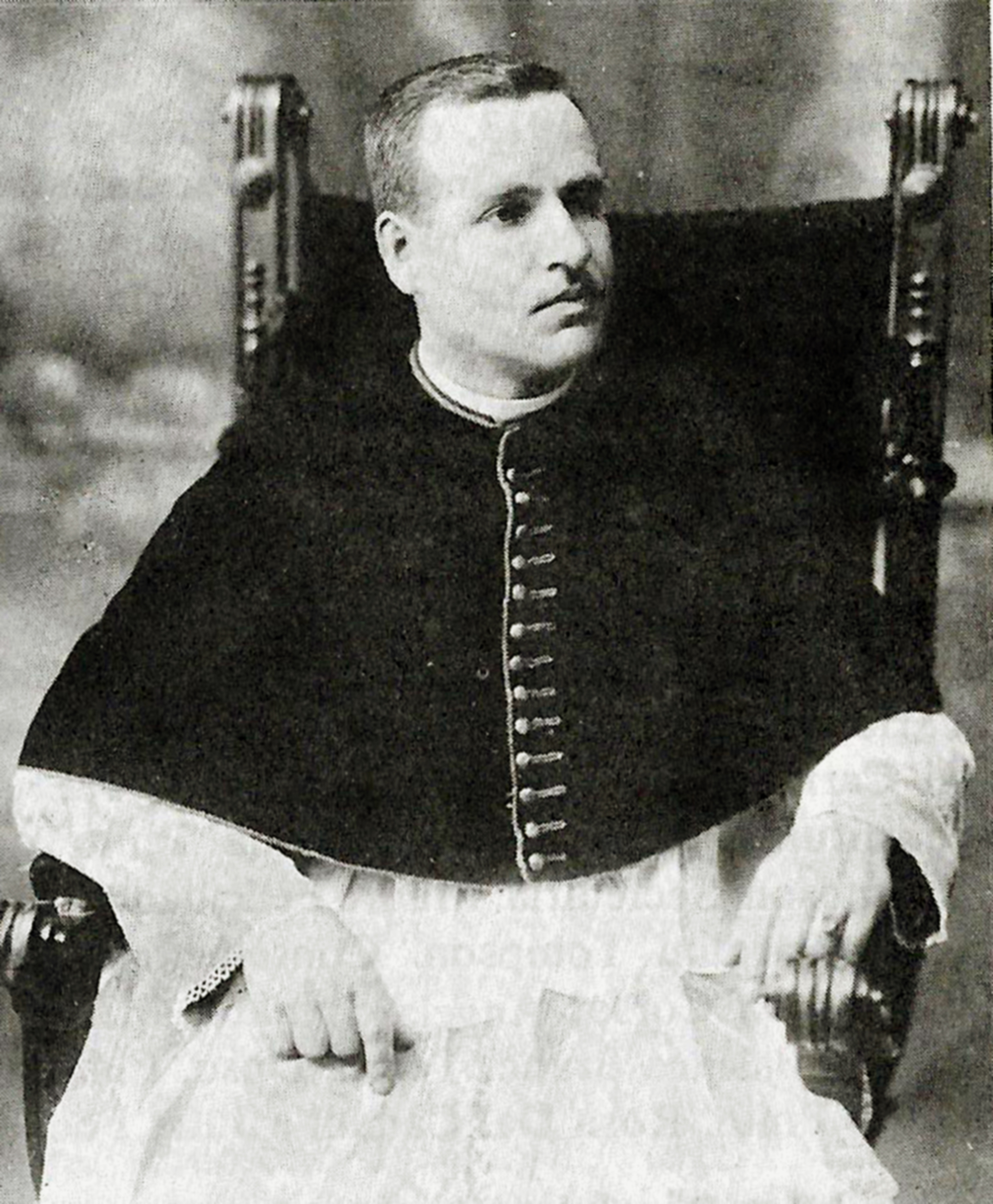
João Meneguzzi.

The foundation of cultural societies was also understood as a way to create places of consensus among divergent forces and to dispel tendencies to form radical groups, seen as harmful to the harmony of society and public morality, especially by trying to attract young people, who, under the tutelage of the Church, would be "well formed" and could eventually serve the community as good citizens and loyal Catholics, able, when necessary, to confront the dominant party in defense of the Church. One of these societies was the Apostleship of Prayer, a national movement that was one of the Church's hopes for a Catholic renewal of society, seeking to reach families directly through the cultivation of a spirit of Christian living, as well as a sense of hierarchy through the guidance of a group of custodians, who were responsible for preserving religious orthodoxy and Christian morality and curbing its deviations, and who should preferably have ties with the PRR. In Caxias, the Apostolate had members with important political connections in its Board of Directors: the president, Amazília Pinto de Moraes, was the wife of the future intendant José Penna de Moraes; the treasurer, Luiza Ronca, was the wife of a city councilor; the secretary, Hermelinda de Lavra Pinto, was the wife of one of the directors of the Jornal de Caxias, a republican newspaper. The foundation of the Ladies of Charity was similar, with members linked to prominent public figures, such as Amazília herself. The land for the construction of their headquarters and hospital was donated by the freemasonry through the intervention of her husband, then already an intendant and honorary president of the Recreio Dante Society. In this way, a solid network of reciprocities was organized among the main powers of the city, a process in which Meneguzzi played a key role. According to Biavaschi, "the presence of Father John Meneguzzi in the politics of Caxias in the 1920s was remarkable, especially after the election to the state government in 1922". His activity was so outstanding that it led to a protest on the cover of the newspaper O Brasil, of October 20, 1923, against the alleged transformation of religious temples into political platforms, where "demagogues preached subversion". In 1924, the Liberator Party published, without his knowledge, a pamphlet proposing his candidacy for intendant, which aroused controversy in a period of crisis in the succession.

The articulated alliance between the PRR and the Church ensured the party's continuity in power and put down the opposition of other parties. In 1924, the Italian Celeste Gobbato was elected to the Intendency, representative of both Catholics and Republicans, as well as pleasing the locals for his ethnicity. During his administration, Meneguzzi participated in the Pro-Caxias Commission, a team composed of illustrious personalities and created with the objective of "collaborating with the municipal public powers in solving the various problems that affect life in Caxias". The commission was structured into several sectoral sub-commissions. The most influential was the Sub-Commission of Publicity, which was completely dominated by the Church. In the words of Eliana Rela,

The Church had not participated directly in the electoral process of 1924, but had invested for a long time in the organization and formation of a 'pressure group', whose actions would facilitate its access to political power with the objective of influencing its decisions. The Catholic institution would not administer the municipality on its own, however, it was organized to influence and change aspects of society, according to its interests. [...] Of all the sub-commissions, the one that stood out the most was that of Publicity, because, being in the hands of the ecclesiastical hierarchy, the Catholic press, the Sunday sermons, the chapels were at the disposal of the governing machine... [...]

Both the amounts collected by the Publicity Commission and by the Popular Deposit Box were destined to the works of the Target Plan, outlined by the republican government. In the plan drawn by the Church to value and support the government of Celeste Gobbato, besides the constant articles published in the Catholic press praising the intendant and his performance, there was the need for this administrator to participate in the frequent celebrations promoted by the Church. Feasts to the saints, masses for birthdays, blessing of bells in various chapels. So much so that, in the Holy Book of the Saint Teresa Parish, Celeste Gobbato appears as godfather of the blessing of the bells of the Our Lady of Monte Bérico, Chapel of Saint Valentine, Chapel of Our Lady of Pedancino and Chapel of Saint Joseph of VI Légua. All the solemnities for the blessing of the bells were performed by Canon Meneguzzi. As the ecclesiastical hierarchy articulated the Intendant's publicity and his "laborious administration", the municipal government, in turn, authorized subsidies to the priests or mediated the release of benefits donated by the State Government. [...] All the support, externalized by the local Church to the intendant, obtained from him the maximum commitment for the creation of the Bishopric of Caxias.

== Legacy ==
Meneguzzi earned the respect of the community, over which he exerted great influence. He received many tributes and praises during his life, called "respectable", "respected and prestigious", "virtuous" and "very worthy", "honorable and cultured", "perfect model of a priest and pioneer of the good cause", of "heroic and undefeated life", and owner of "exceptional kindness and faith"; the press of the time brings numerous thanks from families for his tireless dedication to the sick and dying, and he is remembered as a great organizer and a dynamo of community life on multiple levels. According to Brandalise, historian of the parish, "he continued the work of his predecessor with unusual brilliance, having in his vicariate of 32 years and one day accomplished a series of apostolic and material works that made him worthy of the esteem and consideration of Caxias". His name today baptizes an avenue.

== See also ==
- History of Caxias do Sul
