= FMC Electronic Technical School =

- Portuguese: Escola Técnica de Eletrônica Francisco Moreira da Costa

Location
- Santa Rita do Sapucai, Minas Gerais; Brazil
- Coordinates: 22°15′27.54″S 45°42′12.56″W

Information
- Former name: Francisco Moreira da Costa Electronics Technical School
- Type: Private technical school
- Religious affiliation: Catholic
- Denomination: Jesuit
- Established: 1959; 67 years ago
- Gender: Coeducational
- Nickname: ETE
- Website: www.etefmc.com.br

FMC Electronic Technical School (Portuguese: Escola Técnica de Eletrônica Francisco Moreira da Costa) is a private Catholic technical school located in Santa Rita do Sapucai, Minas Gerais, Brazil. Founded in 1959 by "Dona" Moreira and placed under the direction of the Society of Jesus, FMC ETE was the first school of electronics in Latin America, giving rise to Brazil's Electronics Valley.

== History ==
"Dona" Sinha Moreira (Luzia Rennó Moreira, 1907–1963) envisioned a better future for the people in the rural area of her birth, Santa Rita do Sapucai. During world travels with her diplomat husband she was impressed by the technology of the time in Japan. In 1959 she founded the first school of electronics in Latin America, the Francisco Moreira da Costa Electronics Technical School, named for her father. It gave rise to Electronics Valley. This gradually transformed the local culture from agrarian to an electronics and information technology center.

Moreira died soon after construction began on the school. She left the school board in the hands of the Jesuits.

== See also ==
- List of Jesuit educational institutions
- Education in Brazil
- List of schools in Brazil
