= Santa Rita Biological Reserve =

- Reserva Biológica de Serra de Santa Rita Mítzi Brandão
- IUCN category Ia (strict nature reserve)
- Location within Brazil
- Nearest city: Santa Rita do Sapucaí, Minas Gerais
- Coordinates: 22°11′56″S 45°44′31″W
- Area: 305 hectares (750 acres)
- Designation: Biological reserve
- Created: 15 October 1980

Santa Rita Biological Reserve (Portuguese: Reserva Biológica de Serra de Santa Rita Mítzi Brandão) is a biological reserve in the state of Minas Gerais, Brazil.

The reserve was established in the municipality of Santa Rita do Sapucaí by municipal law 1096 on 15 October 1980, with revised municipal laws on 27 October 1980 and 19 December 1984 and the Federal SNUC law 9985 on 18 June 2000. The reserve covers an area of 305 hectares (750 acres) for the purpose of fully and permanently preserving the ecosystem and natural resources of the area, and particularly the genetic reserve of flora and fauna for scientific, educational and cultural purposes. Any form of exploitation of the natural resources of the reserve is prohibited.

== Sources ==
- Reserva Biológica de Serra de Santa Rita Mítzi Brandão (in Portuguese), Prefeitura Municipal de Santa Rita do Sapucaí
