= St. Louis College, Sao Paulo =

St. Louis College
- Colégio São Luís

Location
- Paulista Ave. São Paulo, São Paulo; Brazil
- Coordinates: 23°33′23.67″S 46°39′38.21″W

Information
- Type: Jesuit, Catholic
- Established: 1867 (159 years ago) in Itu, São Paulo state
- Grades: Kindergarten through secondary
- Gender: Coeducational
- Enrollment: 2,500
- Website: saoluis.org (in Portuguese)

St. Louis College (Portuguese: Colégio São Luís), is a Brazilian Catholic school located in the city of São Paulo. It was founded by the Jesuits in 1867. The school has classes from kindergarten through high school. St. Louis College's business school ceased operations in 2009, and students were transferred to Centro Universitário da FEI and Pontifical Catholic University of São Paulo.

== History ==
St. Louis College was the second college founded in Brazil by the Society of Jesus after the society's suppression. Jesuit priests founded the school in Itu, São Paulo state, in 1867. In 1917, it was moved to the city of São Paulo.

In 1943, the school opened an evening business school providing graduate business courses, accommodating over 2500 students from private and public schools, many of whom were professionals in finance working nearby. As a Jesuit institution, the school helped new students by providing financial aid. In 1948, one of the first economics schools in the city was opened, then moved to the Jesuit Centro Universitário da FEI and Pontifical Catholic University of São Paulo.

In 1972, the school began receiving girls, a novelty among São Paulo schools at the time.

The late 1990s saw the construction of Saint Aloysius Gonzaga Church next to the school, along with more classrooms and the extension of classes to kindergarten.

== Notable alumni ==
- Amyr Klink – explorer and sailor
- Ayrton Senna – racing driver
- Eduardo Suplicy – academic, economist and politician
- Maria Fernanda Cândido – actress and model
- Paulo Maluf – politician

== See also ==
- Catholic Church in Brazil
- Education in Brazil
- List of Jesuit sites
- List of schools in Brazil
