= Colégio Dante Alighieri =

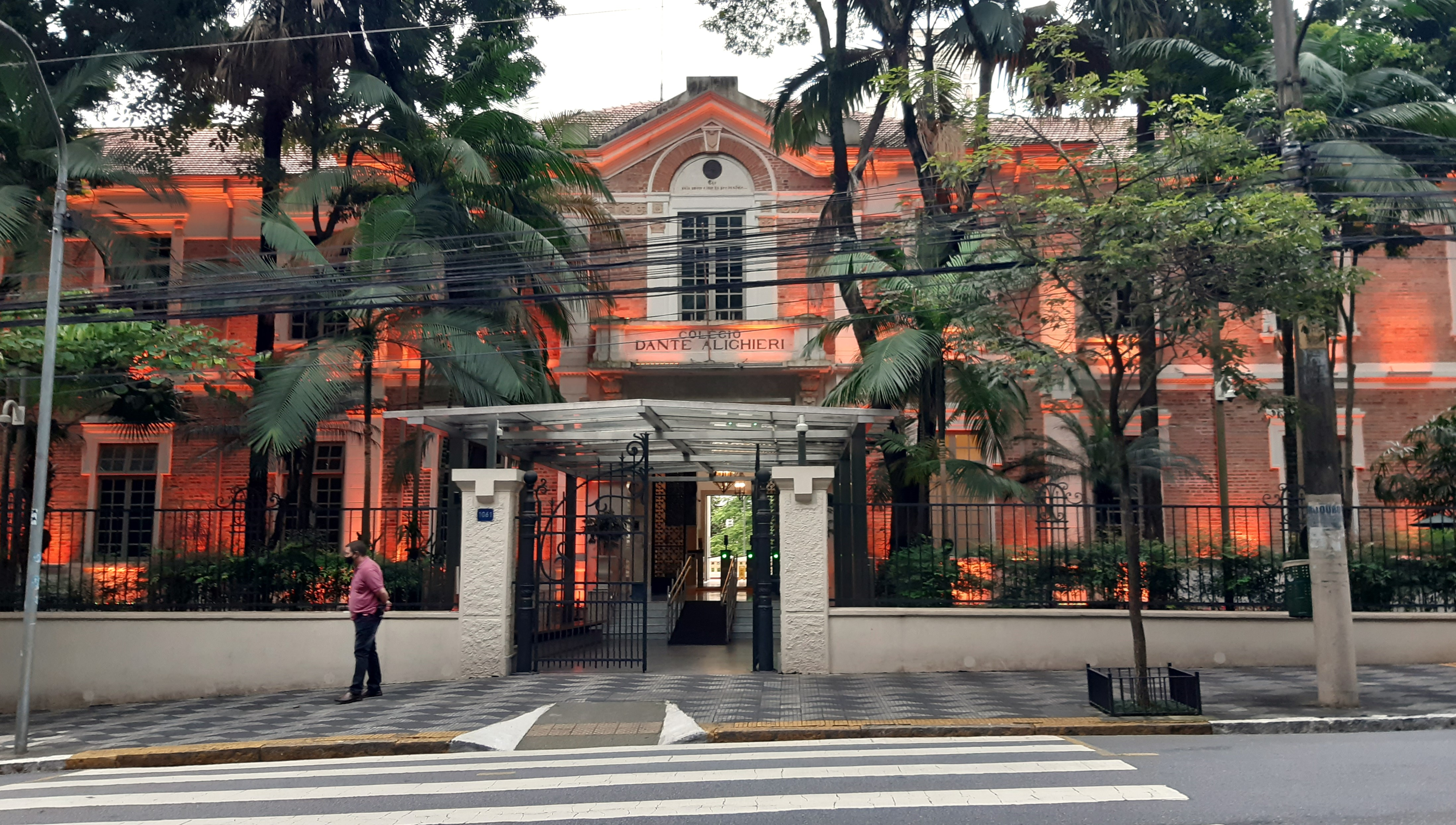
- Front door of the school
- Jardim Paulista; São Paulo, Brazil

Information
- School type: Private school
- Established: July 9, 1911

Colégio Dante Alighieri is a private elementary and high school based in São Paulo, Brazil.

Founded by Italian immigrants and named after the Florentine poet, it is considered one of the most traditional schools in Brazil. Its building is protected as a cultural and historical heritage site by the government of São Paulo.

== See also ==
- List of schools in Brazil
- Education in Brazil
- Colégio Dante Alighieri alumni
