= St. Ignatius College, Fortaleza =

St ignatius College
- Portuguese: Colegio Santo Inacio

Location
- Av. Judge Moreira, 2355; Fortaleza, Ceará; Brazil
- Coordinates: 3°44′47″S 38°30′4″W

Information
- Type: Private primary and secondary school
- Religious affiliation: Catholic
- Denomination: Jesuit
- Established: 1955 (71 years ago) as Apostolic Pre-School Our Lady of Fatima
- Director: José Robson Silva Sousa, SJ
- Headmaster
- Staff: 72
- Grades: Kindergarten through high school
- Gender: Coeducational
- Enrollment: 744
- Website: santoinacio.com.br

St. Ignatius College (Portuguese: Colégio Santo Inácio) is a Brazilian Catholic school located in Fortaleza, Ceará. It offers kindergarten through high school as well as an evening school which enables workers to complete elementary and high school. The school was founded by the Society of Jesus in 1955.

== History ==
St. Ignatius College began in 1955 as a small school at the Church of Christ the King, under the name of Apostolic Pre-School Our Lady of Fatima. The following year it took the name Christ the King Day School but had semi-boarding. A new foundation was laid in 1960 and the school moved to its current headquarters under the name St. Ignatius College in 1963.

Its directors have all been Jesuit priests:

- Gerardo Sá da Silveira – 1963–1967
- José Correia – 1967–1972
- Pedro Alberto Campos – 1972–1977
- Antonio Farias Basic – 1977–1979
- Luciano – 1980–1986
- Pedro Vicente Ferreira – 1986–1988
- Manuel Madruga – 1988–1991
- Benjamin Gesteira – 1992–1995
- Pedro Vicente Ferreira – 1996–2001
- José Ivan Dias – 2002–2005
- Antonio Tabosa – 2005–2008
- Raimundo Kroth – 2008–2010
- Ponciano Petri – 2010–2011

== See also ==
- List of Jesuit educational institutions
