= Escola Estadual de Educação Básica Frei Casimiro Zaffonato =

Location
- Ipê, Rio Grande do Sul 95240-000; Brazil
- Coordinates: 28°49′09″S 51°16′49″W

Information
- Former names: Escola Estadual de 1º e 2º Graus Dom Frei Cândido Bampi Escola Estadual de 1º Grau Dom Frei Cândido Bampi Ginásio Estadual de Vila Ipê
- Established: March 1, 1969
- Founder: Frei Casimiro Zaffonato
- Status: active
- Area trustee: Associação Beneficente São Luiz Rei
- Director: -
- Employees: 30

The Frei Casimiro Zaffonato State School of Basic Education is a public educational institution founded on August 24, 1968, located in the city of Ipê, Rio Grande do Sul, Brazil.

== History ==
Around 1964/1965, a meeting was held with the residents to discuss the city's most pressing needs. Two options were presented: the construction of a school or a hospital. After subsequent meetings, the decision was made to build a school to promote the community's development.

The school began its activities on March 1, 1969, originally under the name Ginásio Estadual de Vila Ipê. The initiative for its construction and founding is mainly attributed to Frei Casimiro Zaffonato, born Ernesto Zaffonato on August 12, 1912. Frei Casimiro took over the Ipê parish in 1964 and, besides his religious duties, dedicated himself to the construction of the school and a sports gymnasium, mobilizing the local community and negotiating with the state government.

The school grounds, covering 4,310 square meters, were acquired through community donations, and the construction saw significant community involvement, with local residents and merchants contributing materials and labor.

In November 2024, students investigating the school library for a research project about the city found documents regarding the emancipation of the municipality of Ipê stored among other papers, and subsequently, at the end of the project, the documents were handed over to Cristiane dos Anjos Parisoto, the Director of the museum's.

== Development and Expansion ==
Initially, the school offered only junior high school courses, but over the years, it expanded its facilities and curriculum. In 1970, the construction of a new wing with nine additional classrooms began. In 1974, the extension to high school was authorized in partnership with Colégio Estadual de Vacaria.

=== The school underwent several name changes and administrative reorganizations ===
- In 1979, it became Escola Estadual de 1º Grau Dom Frei Cândido Bampi.
- In 1982, after the unification of junior high and high school, it was renamed Escola Estadual de 1º e 2º Graus Dom Frei Cândido Bampi.
- In 2000, in honor of its founder, it received its current name, Escola Estadual de Educação Básica Frei Casimiro Zaffonato.

== Infrastructure and Educational Philosophy ==
Today, the school boasts extensive infrastructure, including ten classrooms, a library, two computer labs, a science lab, and an auditorium with a capacity for 150 people. For sports activities, it has a covered gymnasium, an illuminated outdoor court, and restrooms. There is also a playground and a school garden.

The school serves over 500 students in the morning and afternoon shifts, offering nine years of elementary education and high school. In addition to being one of the oldest structures in the municipality, it is the only school in the city that provides high school education.
