= Pinhais =

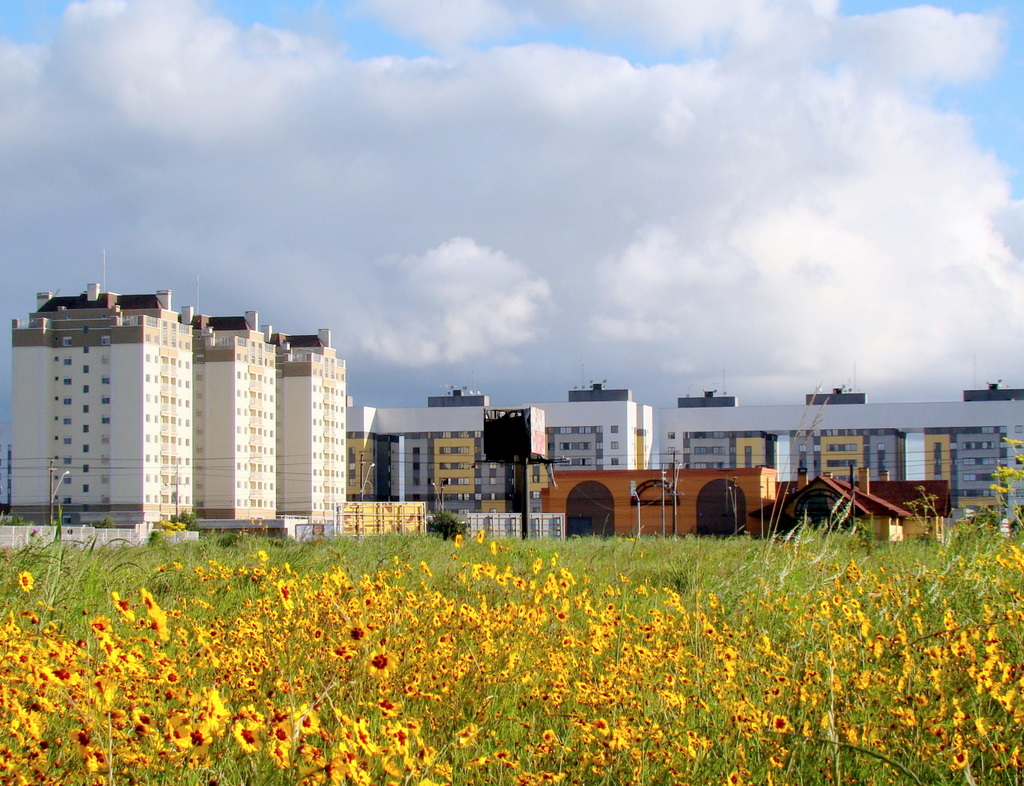
- Buildings at the boundary between Pinhais and Curitiba

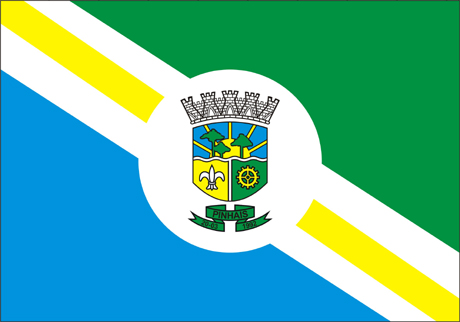
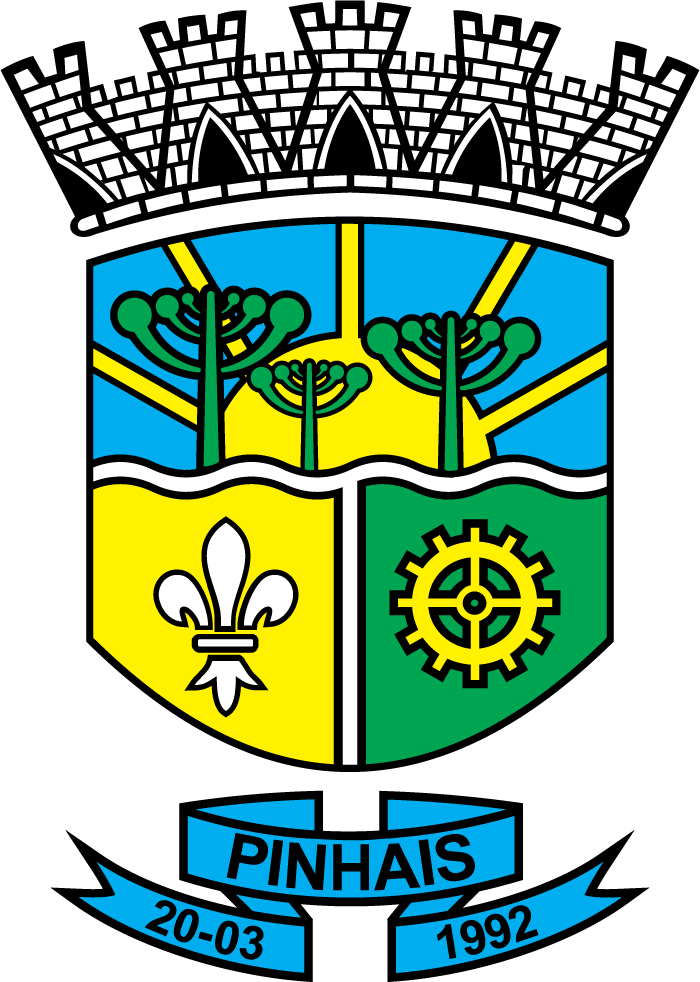
- Flag Coat of arms
- Nicknames: "Terra dos pinheirais" / "Morada da Gralha-Azul" (Land of the pine fields / Home of the Azure Jay)
- Location of Pinhais in Paraná state and Brazil
- Coordinates: 25°25′57″S 49°11′36″W
- Country: Brazil
- Region: South
- State: Paraná
- Founded: March 20, 1992

Government
  - Mayor: Luiz Goularte Alves (PT)

Area
  - Total: 60.869 km^{2} (23.502 sq mi)
- Elevation: 893 m (2,930 ft)

Population (2022 Census)
  - Total: 133,490
  - Estimate (2025): 131,255
  - Density: 2,193.1/km^{2} (5,680.0/sq mi)
- Time zone: UTC−3 (BRT)
- HDI (2000): 0.815 – high
- Website: www.pinhais.pr.gov.br

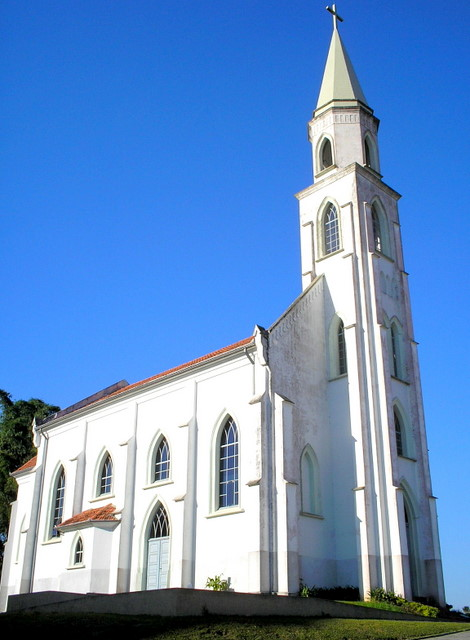
Our Lady of Good Hope Church

Pinhais is a municipality in Paraná state in Brazil. As of 2022 Census, the population was 127,019. It was emancipated from the municipality of Piraquara in 1992 and is part of the Metropolitan region of Curitiba. It is the smallest municipality in Paraná by area.

== História ==
Due to its proximity to Curitiba, the territory of the present-day municipality of Pinhais followed the course of events during the occupation and development of the Curitiba plateau, centered on the capital of Paraná. The construction of the Curitiba-Paranaguá Railway, which cut through the region to the east, was important. Near the Brasholanda company, there was a ceramics factory owned by the Joaquim Torres family. The company was acquired in the mid-1920s, under mortgage, by Guilherme Weiss, who perfected the production technique. Count Humberto Scarpa, Guilherme Weiss's son-in-law, inherited the ceramics factory, maintaining production until 1960. Later, he established the Rui Itiberê da Cunha real estate company, subdividing and offering for sale the areas of Weissópolis, Vargem Grande, Vila Esplanada, and Vila Tarumã.

The recent history of the municipality of Pinhais is intertwined with the history of urban settlement in Curitiba. Based on the developmental policies adopted in Brazil from the mid-1950s onward, northern Paraná was the scene of agricultural expansion, initially with the planting of coffee plantations. The encouragement of grain agriculture (soybean, wheat, corn, and cotton) dramatically expanded land use in the state, especially in the northern and southwestern regions, in the 1960s and 1970s, solidifying Paraná as the "Breadbasket of Brazil."

== Education ==
Private schools:

- Colégio Suíço-Brasileiro de Curitiba
