= St. Francis Xavier College, São Paulo =

Catholic school in Brazil

St. Francis Xavier College
- Colégio São Francisco Xavier

Location
- Moreira and Costa Street, 531; Subprefecture of Ipiranga, São Paulo, São Paulo; Brazil
- Coordinates: 23°35′20.87″S 46°36′32.2″W

Information
- Former name: Japanese Catholic College of St. Francis Xavier
- Type: Private primary and secondary school
- Religious affiliation: Catholic
- Denomination: Jesuit
- Established: 1928 (98 years ago)
- Founder: Guido del Toro
- Rector: Eduardo Beltramini
- Director: Reinaldo Correa de Aquino Jr.
- Teaching staff: 62
- Grades: K-12
- Gender: Coeducational
- Enrollment: 1,219
- Website: sanfra.g12.br

St. Francis Xavier College (Colégio São Francisco Xavier) is a Brazilian co-educational Catholic school located in the Subprefecture of Ipiranga of the city of São Paulo. It was founded by the Jesuits in 1928 and covers kindergarten through high school.

== History and operations ==
Guido del Toro arrived in Brazil from Italy in 1914 and dedicated himself to the evangelization of Japanese immigrants. In 1928, he founded Japanese Catholic College of St. Francis Xavier in a rented house on Liberty Street. He received the present property in 1929 and by 1931 resituated the school there, still dedicated to serving the Japanese.

In 1950, it grew to being a primary and gymnasium. With the completion of a new building in 1966, it became a high school and took the name St. Francis Xavier College.

=== Rectors ===
- 1928–1950 – Guido del Toro
- 1950–1959 – Ignatius Shigeo Takenchi
- 1961–1965 – Angelo Banki
- 1965–1971 – André Massao Ozaki
- 1971–1977 – Fernando Maria Alvarez de Miranda
- 1977–1983 – José Maria Herreros Robles
- 1983–1984 – Angel López Abad
- 1984–1987 – Paul Pedreira de Freitas
- 1987–1988 – Luis Pecci
- 1988–1992 – Roberto Villar
- 1992–1999 – Nelson Lopes da Silva
- 1999–2005 – Laertes J. Cargnelutti
- 2005–2010 – Manuel Madruga Samaniego
- 2011 – Eduardo Henriques
- 2012 – Eduardo Beltramini

== See also ==
- List of Jesuit sites
