= Saint Catherine College =

Colégio Catarinense

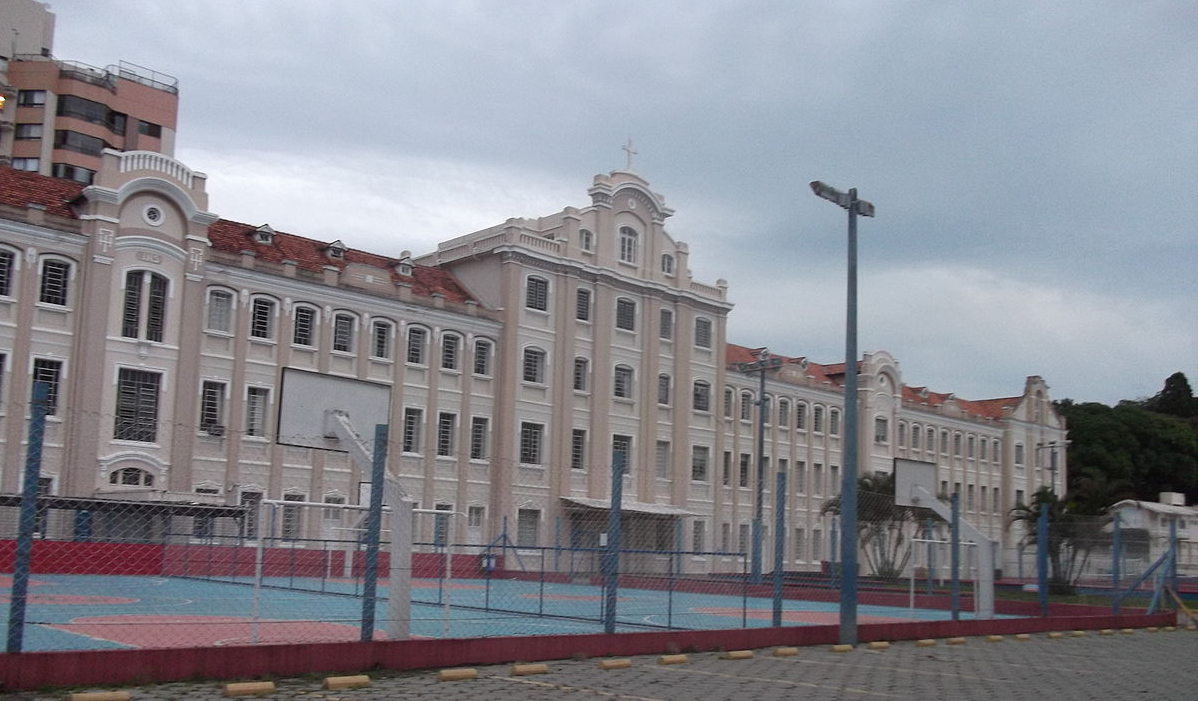

Location
- Florianópolis, Santa Catarina; Brazil
- Coordinates: 27°35′20.3″S 48°33′13.5″W

Information
- Type: Private primary and secondary school
- Religious affiliation: Catholic
- Denomination: Jesuit
- Established: 1905; 121 years ago
- Gender: Coeducational
- Enrollment: 2,718
- Website: www.colegiocatarinense.g12.br

Catarinense College (Colégio Catarinense) is a private Catholic primary and secondary school located on Florianópolis island, Santa Catarina, off the coast of Brazil. The school was founded in 1905 by the Society of Jesus at the request of the Santa Catarina state governor at the time. It is maintained by the Antônio Vieira Society.

== Chronology ==
Jesuits reopened a college on the Island on 25 September 1845, with an opening class of 30 students. After three years at the Provincial house they received their own building at Getúlio Vargas Square, including boarding facilities. In 1854 over half of the Jesuits fell victim to yellow fever and the school was closed until 1865 when it was reopened under the name Holy Savior College, with 110 students.

When the Conservative party took over from the Liberal Party in 1871, they withdrew government support from the Jesuits and the school. It was not until 1905 that it was reopened under the name of Santa Catarina Gymnasium. This received support from President Vidal Ramos of the state of Santa Catarina and from the Antônio Vieira Society. Classes resumed in 1906. In 1915 the gymnasium was officially granted status as a college and was named Colegio Catharinense (modern spelling Colégio Catarinense) by presidential decree in January 1943. From its founding until 1963 the college had a boarding facility for students from other cities. In 1970 the college began to admit girls. In 1972 Catarinense College was integrated into the State System of Education.

Since 1998 the college offers full high school scholarships to needy students in Florianópolis, with a night school program that has grown to accommodate 422 students. Between 1999 and 2000 classes were extended to include kindergarten through grade four. From 2006 elementary school was extended to nine years, in accordance with federal law.

== See also ==
- List of Jesuit educational institutions
