= Colégio Centenário =

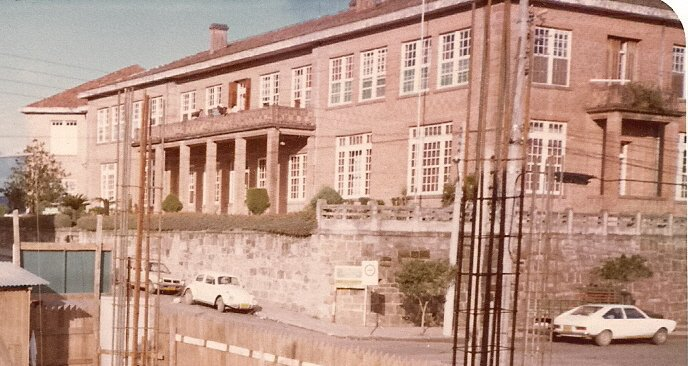
View of the building burned down in 2007, probably from the 1970s

The Colégio Centenário is a Methodist college located at Rua Dr. Tury, in Santa Maria, Rio Grande do Sul. The name derives from the founding date, March 27, 1922, which was the centenary of the independence of Brazil. Its founders were two American missionaries from the Methodist Church, Miss Louise Best and Miss Eunice Andrew. Funding was obtained through the efforts of the Methodist Ladies' Societies of the United States of America, as part of celebrations of the Centenary Methodist Mission.

At first it was just a cottage, but over the years, several buildings were built and the school began offering courses at all levels, from preschool through college, for that is integrated the Methodist College in Santa Maria - FAMES (in the same buildings). The architectural style follows the model of universities in the United States of America, resembling the shape of a house, with a triangular roof and brick wall without coverage.

Originally a school for girls, it began accepting boys in the 1970s.

Since 2006, the Methodist Colégio Centenário is part of the Education Network of Southern Methodist and is directed by a board representing the Methodist Church.

== Events ==
- On the first anniversary of the school in 1923, the students placed green boughs of white cloth on the tables of the internship, giving rise to the colors of the college: white and green - to symbolize purity and hope .
- In the paleontological expeditions that occurred in Paleorrota, Llewellyn Ivor Price stayed in college.

== See also ==
- Paleorrota
