= Colégio La Salle Carmo =

Private school in Brazil

Coordinates: 29.1703°S 51.1791°W

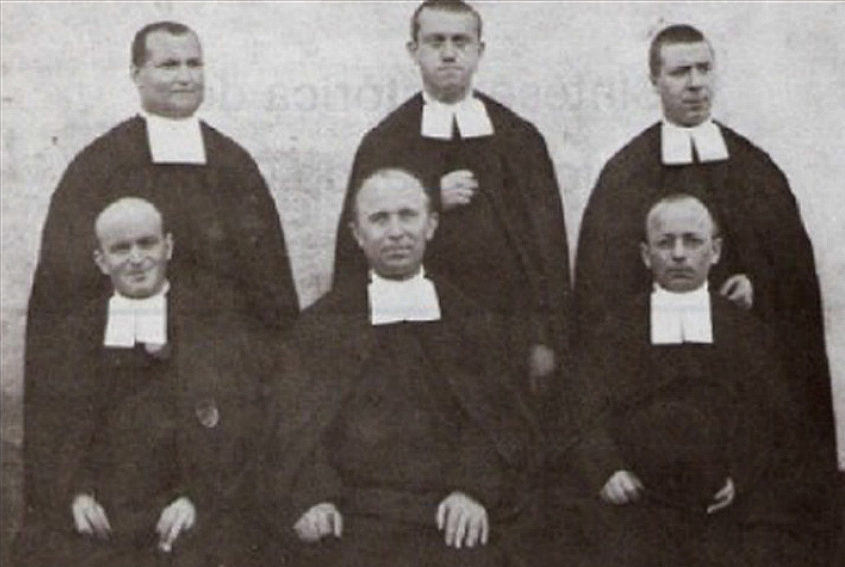
The founders of the Colégio do Carmo. Sitting: Brothers Xavier Domingos, Anastácio Pascal and Frumêncio. Standing: Inocencio, León and Fabiano Alberto.

The Colégio La Salle Carmo (English: La Salle Carmo College) is a secondary school in downtown Caxias do Sul, Rio Grande do Sul, Brazil. It is run by the De La Salle Brothers of the La Salle Brazil-Chile Province. It is one of the oldest private schools in Caxias.

== History ==
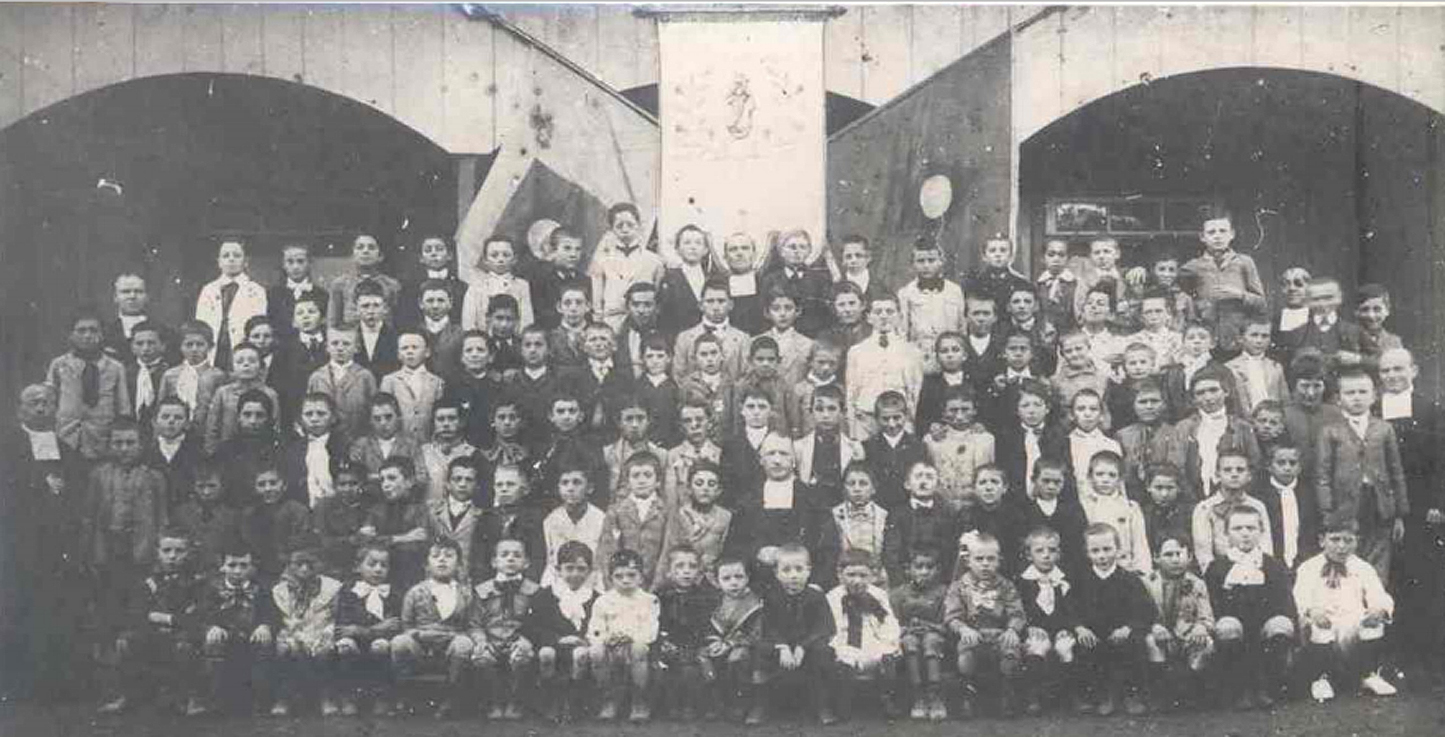
Teachers and students in 1911.

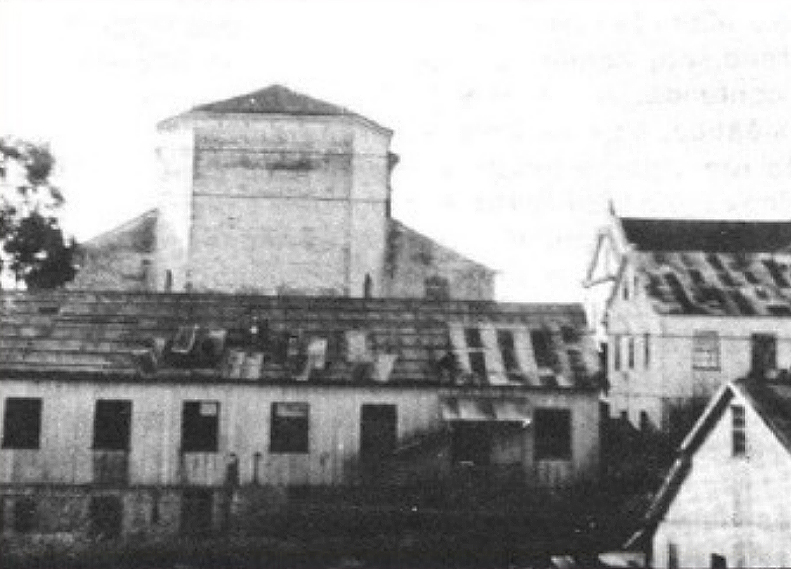
The Colégio do Carmo had the wooden house as its second headquarters, which operated between 1911 and 1928. In the right corner, the house where the brothers' accommodation was located.

The college was founded by a group of six French Lasallian Brothers, led by Brother Anastace Pascal, who arrived on January 28, 1908. The Lasallians had settled in Brazil in 1907 in response to requests from the bishop of Rio Grande do Sul, Dom Claudio Ponce de Leão, and the Belgian priest Joseph Martin Moreau. The six founders rented a house where they started teaching on 4 February 1907, with 30 pupils, increased to 97 by the end of the term. The school was for Catholic boys; attendance at mass was mandatory on Sundays and religious festivals.

By 1910 demand required larger premises, so the Parish Hall, behind the parish church, was used. In 1911 the school was named Carmo after the Italian former parish priest of Caxias, Carmine Fasulo. In 1913, an evening course for adults was created and in 1914, the school started hosting candidates for admission to the Lasallian Order.

The early years were difficult due to the poor basic structure. Administratively, the institution was a parish school accountable to the parish priest, himself accountable to a Works Committee, the "Fabriqueiros". (Note: "Fabriqueiros (Church Factory): It is the juridical person to whom belong all the goods and rights destined to the conservation, repair, maintenance and exercise of the worship of a church. The bishop, together with other canons, administers the Cathedral, while the parish priest, helped by the council for economic affairs, also called the Fabriqueira Commission, of compulsory constitution (CDC 537), administers the Parish Church. It is their duty to administer according to canonical and civil law, and in particular to keep the inventory of goods up to date and to annually report to the bishop (cf. CDC 1273-1310). The name of Fabriqueira Commission comes from Decree No. 11.887 of 06/07/1926, which gives to a moral person recognized by the State the responsibility of managing the goods of the parochial benefit and the parish church factory, a name that has persisted after the Concordat of 1940." Apud Lazzaron (2015), p. 91.) This organization was composed of leaders of society and dealt with all the affairs of the parish that concerned finances and administration of goods and various projects, including fundraising, the construction and maintenance of church buildings and chapels, and work on the church building, which lacked a façade and internal decoration. The college had considerable legal autonomy. Due to frequent disagreements and power struggles between the groups, the acquisition of land and the building of the new headquarters were complicated and time-consuming. According to Vanessa Lazzaron the Brothers had conflicts with the parish, especially during the administration of Canon João Meneguzzi, due to disagreements about educational philosophy and issues related to the rent and financing of the construction of the new school, perpetuating a climate of animosity between the institutions for many years.

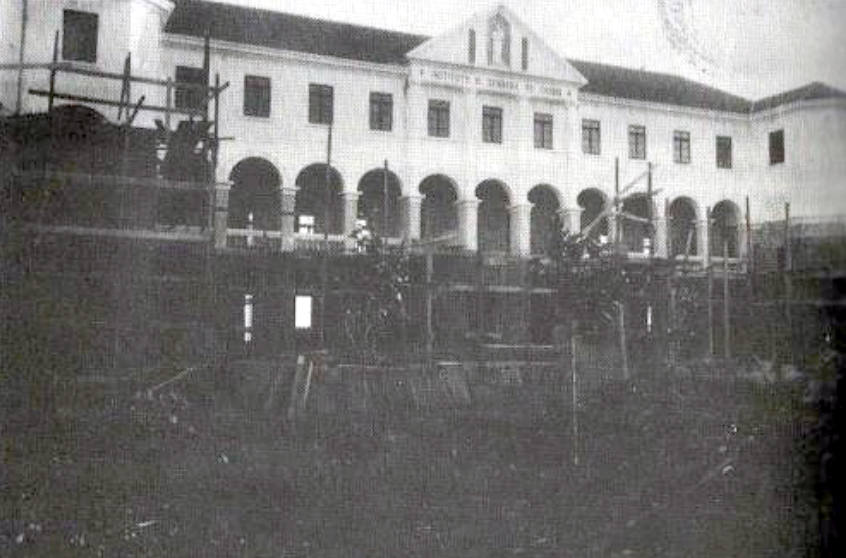
The new headquarters under construction, 1927.

In 1922, the parish ordered the brothers to vacate the premises and build a new school elsewhere. Construction work started in 1924, under the direction of Brother Mauricio. Land was bought in front of the previous premises, and construction was organized by the Brother Mauricio and a special commission that had Canon Meneguzzi and the municipal intendant Celeste Gobbato as honorary presidents. Funding came from loans and donations from the community, including committee members. The school started partial operation in 1928, and was fully operational by the end of 1929. It was originally named Instituto Nossa Senhora do Carmo. The new headquarters were designed by Joseph Lutzenberger and executed by Silvio Toigo, who later built the side wings in the same style. The press reported the school's opening, praising its teaching and the architecture of the building.

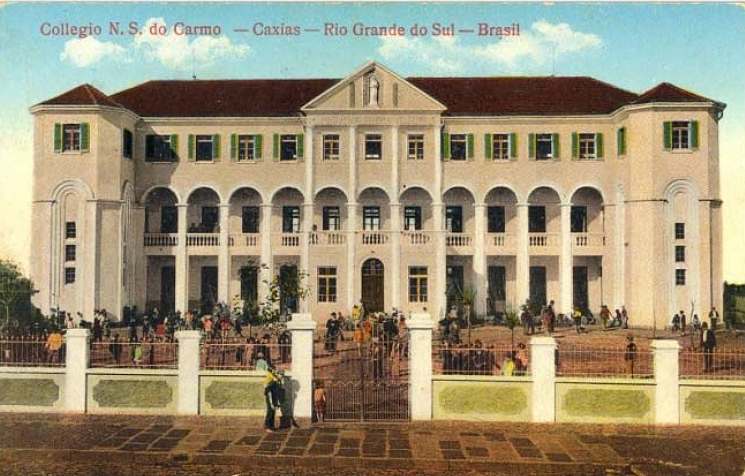
The new headquarters in 1930

At this time, the school offered an education in three sections:

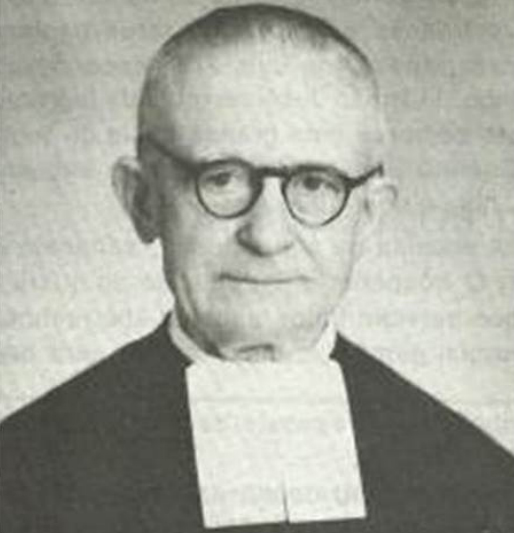
Brother Mauricio.

- First section: preliminary one-year for six-year-olds, covering religion, reading, mental arithmetic and calligraphy;
- Second section: a three-year elementary course, including religion, reading, calligraphy, Portuguese, mental calculus, arithmetic, Brazilian history, drawing, notions of science, notions of commerce, Italian and French, grammar and singing;
- Third section: a five-year secondary and commerce course, involving all the subjects of the gymnasium course, with religious and moral instruction and academic subjects plus music, singing, and gymnastics.

According to Lazzaron, Canon Meneguzzi only came to support the brothers after being convinced of the project, leading to an end to the disputes. The new building, designed by Silvio Toigo, was a large three-story pavilion in classical style, later expanded with two symmetrical wings. In addition to classrooms and administration rooms, the building included a chapel, living quarters for the brothers, a kitchen, dining hall, infirmary, laboratories, a large patio, and sports facilities. In the pediment, a statue of Our Lady of Mount Carmel was installed, and in the balcony, a sculptural group depicted Saint Jean-Baptiste de La Salle pointing to the sky, surrounded by five boys who symbolize the youth of the five continents.

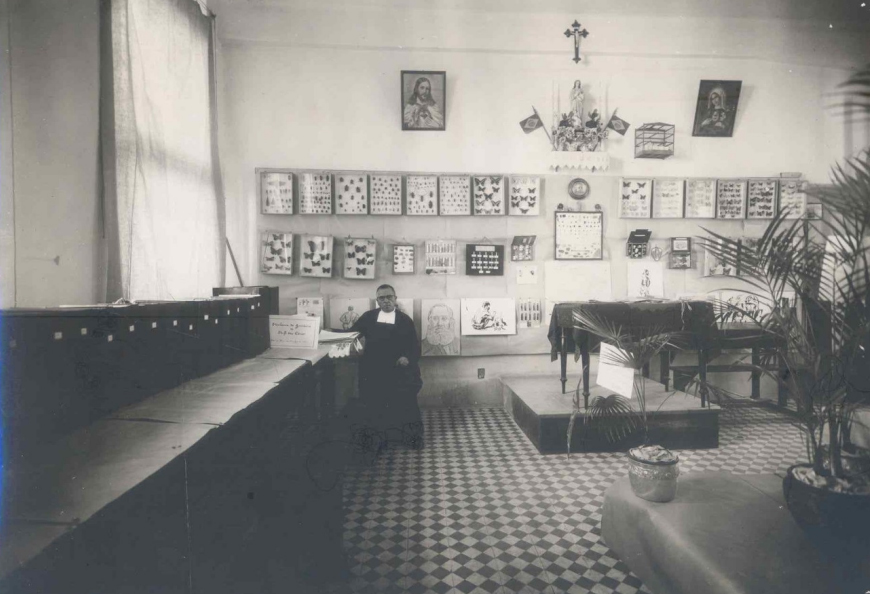
Biology classroom in the 1930s.

In 1929 the Lasallians and their former students started the boarding school, which then operated for 30 years, and took over the direction of the Agricultural Patronage, a special boarding school for poor students and delinquents, at the request of the Municipal Government. In 1929 the secondary course was made official. In 1932 the first class of baccalaureates graduated, and the institution was officially converted into the Ginásio Municipal Nossa Senhora do Carmo, with a complete five-year secondary course and a boarding school; Brother Fidel was the director. In 1933, a group of alumni founded the St. Vincent de Paul Conference, later branching out into three other conferences: Burgo, St. Pelegrino and Curtume. The alumni, gathered in an association, would play an important role in supporting the educational activities. In 1936, to reach poor students, the alumni founded the La Salle School in the São Pelegrino neighborhood, an annex school of Carmo, with free primary, elementary and high school and, later, secretarial and office assistant courses. In 1938, as an evolution of the St. Vincent de Paul Conference, they founded the Caxiense Society for the Help of the Needy. In 1938, the Commercial Course and the Typing School became official, and in 1941, the Technical School of Commerce started operating. In 1949 the Saint Vincent School was founded in the Burgo neighborhood to teach more than 120 poor children.

In 1951, following the Education reform, the Scientific Course was launched. In 1957, the boarding school was extinguished and the Practical Accounting Office was founded, the first model office in the region, in partnership with Mercur Accounting Office, which took real examples to the classroom and encouraged practice. In 1958, a Martial Band started to be organized, which for more than 20 years would brighten up school and civic events in Caxias do Sul. In 1966, the vocal group Os Canarinhos do Carmo appeared, making its presence felt on stages of festivals and shows in several states of Brazil for more than 20 years. In 1970, female students began to be admitted, at first in small numbers, to the Scientific and Commerce levels. In 1974, several adaptations were made, and the chapel was transformed into a sports hall, library and drawing room. At this time, with the extinction of the gymnasium system, the institution was renamed Colégio Nossa Senhora do Carmo.

Throughout most of its history, Carmo offered a range of extra-curricular activities, including excursions to the countryside, literary contests, and spiritual retreats. The student union held political, religious, cultural, and social debates. There was a student newspaper, Avant Première, then renamed Painel Estudantil.

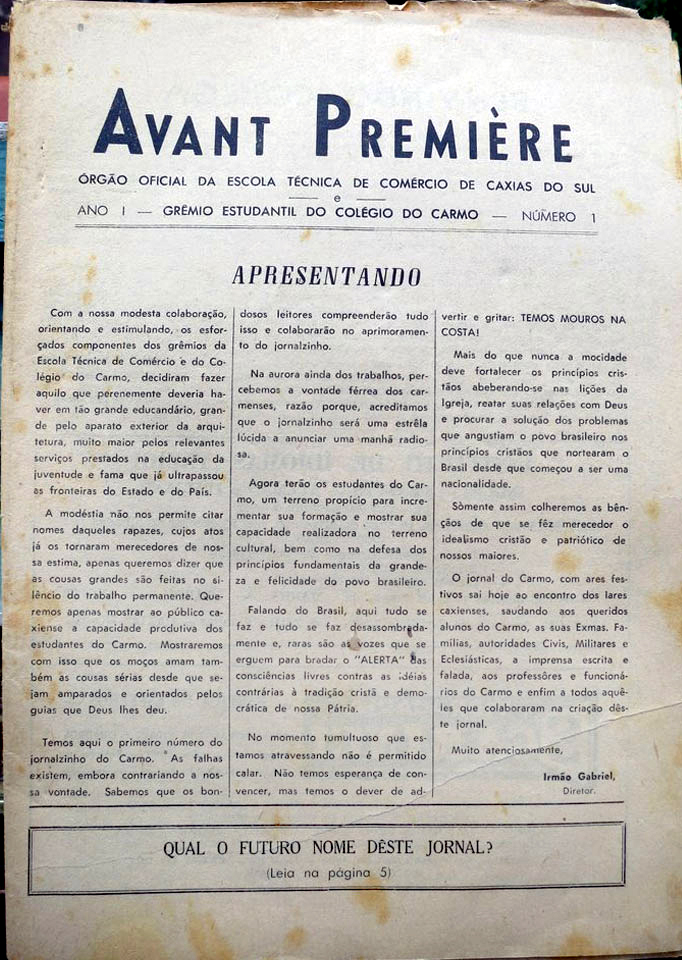
Front page of the first issue of Avant Première.

Notable former pupils include governors Euclides Triches and Pedro Simon, ministers Mário Andreazza and Higino Corsetti, and Senator José Paulo Bisol, and many technicians. From its foundation until 2010, the Colégio do Carmo enrolled more than 40,000 pupils. In the opinion of writer Nilson Luiz May, in Caxias "the Lasallian brothers formed generations of students with extremely solid cultural bases".

In 1974, brothers Bonifácio, José Antão and Fidel received the title of Citizen of Caxias for their relevant services. In 1988, the school was honored in a Solemn Session at the City Hall for its important role in education and promoting the city's culture and history. In 1998, 90 years after its founding, it was honored in the Legislative Assembly of Rio Grande do Sul. In 2008, the centennial was celebrated with a photo exhibit, the publication of a magazine, La Salle Carmo 100 anos: O Ensino Acompanha Gerações, and the book of chronicles and memories of Brother Bonifácio, 1908-1988: Carmo 80 Anos.

== Present day ==
Currently, renamed Colégio La Salle Carmo, it offers kindergarten, elementary and secondary School. In 2014, the school was the best placed in Caxias in the ENEM score. Extra-curricular activities include the Reader's Club, poetry, architecture, painting and art workshops, ballet, English, taekwondo, robotics, theater, futsal, music and swimming schools. The projects include: Noite da Alfabetização, Carmo Brilha (during the Christmas period), Na Serra Gaúcha Batem Corações Italianos (about Italian culture), Qualidade de Vida (sports and contact with nature), and Nós no Centro da Terra (learning from experience and solving practical problems). The school has a Christian Pastoral Department which provides discussion and counseling. As of 2012 Carmo taught about 1,400 students, with about 100 teachers. There are partnerships with other institutions for technical and vocational courses such as Accounting, Job Security, Real Estate Services, Logistics, Information Technology, Management, Financial Sector, Sales and Human Resources.

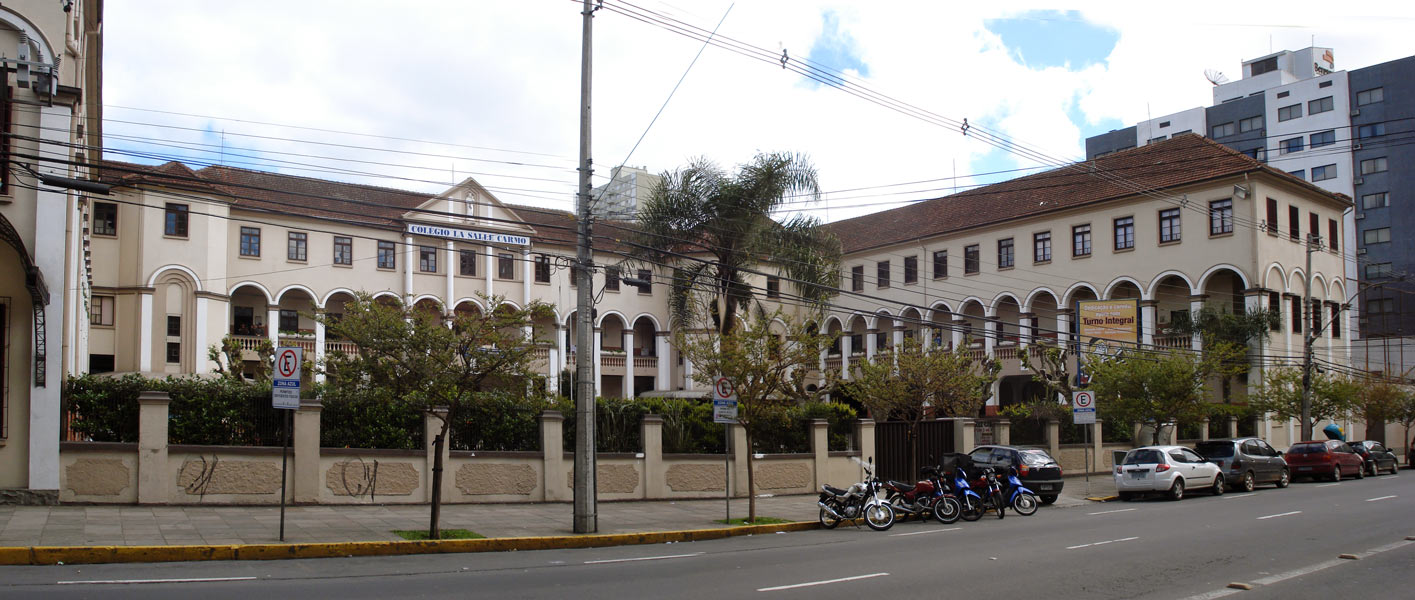
Colégio La Salle Carmo
