= College of Our Lady Mediatrix =

Location
- Prado Velho, Curitiba, Paraná; Brazil; 25°27′16.48″S 49°14′54.06″W

Information
- Type: Private primary and secondary school
- Religious affiliation: Catholic
- Denomination: Jesuit
- Established: 1957; 69 years ago
- Administrator: Gilberto Vieira Vizini
- Rector: Carlos Jahn
- Director: Fernando Guidini
- Staff: 398
- Gender: Coeducational
- Age range: 3 through 17 years
- Enrollment: 2,993
- Campus: 35.83 acres (14.50 ha)
- Publication: Mediação
- Website: www.colegiomedianeira.g12.br

College of Our Lady Mediatrix (Colégio Medianeira) is a private Catholic pre-primary through secondary school in the Prado Velho neighborhood of Curitiba, Paraná, Brazil. It was founded by the Society of Jesus in 1957 and has grown to enroll a student population of about 3,000 students.

== Founding ==
College of Our Lady Mediatrix was founded in 1957 by Oswaldo Gomes, on land donated by the city of Curitiba with the help of Governor Bento Munhoz da Rocha.

Medianeira participates in a distance education program, offering 15 advanced courses through the Jesuit Unisinos University.

== See also ==
- List of Jesuit sites
