= Colégio Suíço-Brasileiro de Curitiba =

Swiss School in Brazil

Colégio Suíço-brasileiro de Curitiba
- Schweizerschule Curitiba
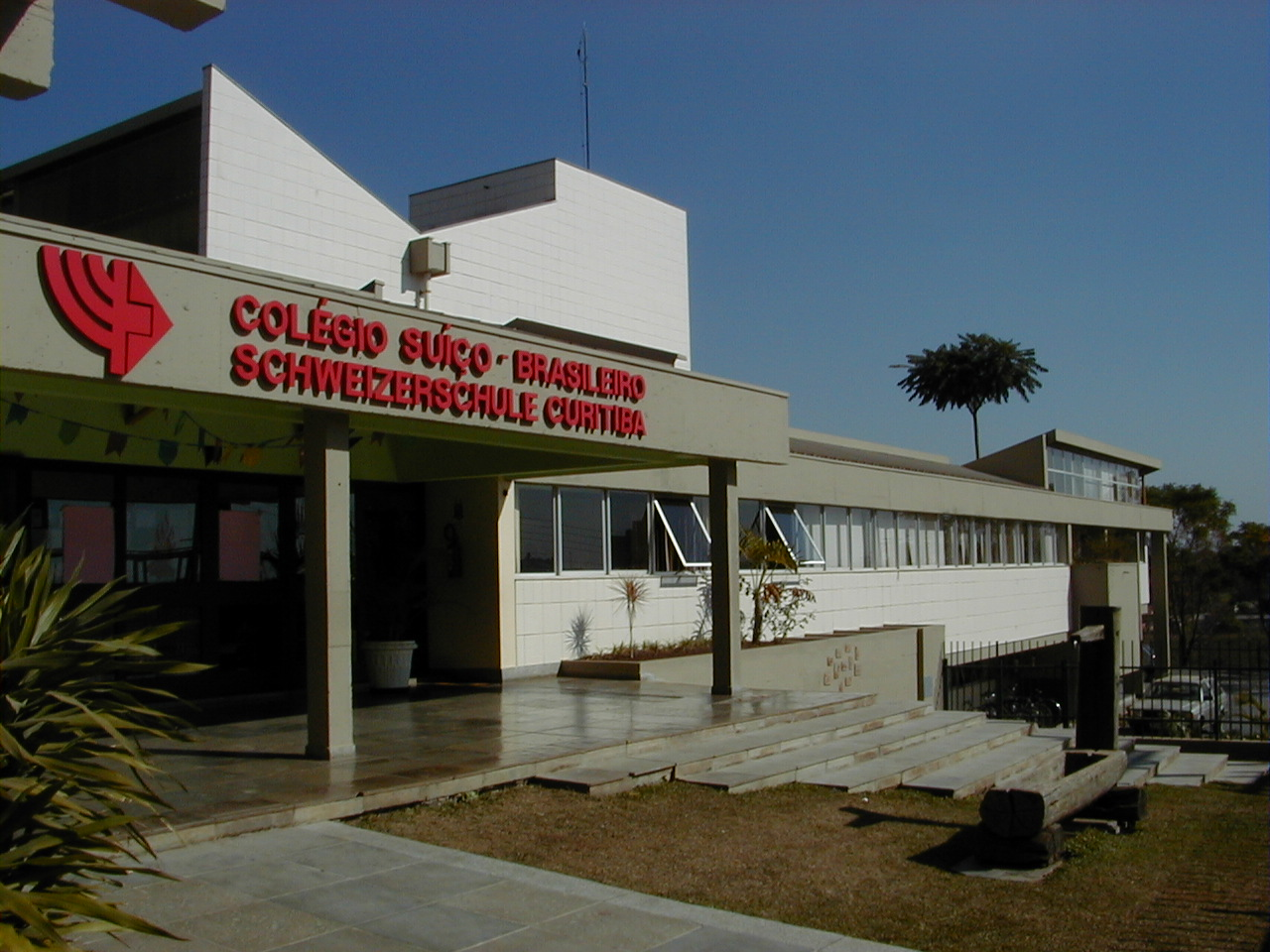

Location
- Rua Wanda dos Santos Mallmann, 537; Centro Pinhais; Pinhais - PR CEP: 83323-400; Brazil
- Coordinates: 25.43515°S 49.18994°W

Information
- Type: Private
- Motto: with head, heart and hand (Johann Heinrich Pestalozzi)
- Established: 1980; 46 years ago
- Director: Reto Schafflützel (Swiss director); Denise Spredemann Friesen Pedagogic director
- Grades: Play group / Kindergarten / primary and secondary school / high school
- Enrollment: ~ 800
- Language: Portuguese, German, English
- Accreditations: Secretaria de Educação do Estado do Paraná, Brazil; Department of Education, Culture and Sport of Aargau, Switzerland
- Website: https://www.chpr.aesb.com.br/

The Colégio Suíço-Brasileiro de Curitiba, the Swiss School Curitiba, German: Schweizerschule Curitiba, is a bilingual private school recognized by the Brazilian state of Paraná. The school comprises nursery, kindergarten, primary, secondary and high school. Pupils can obtain German, English and French language diplomas and complete their secondary education with the International Baccalaureate Diploma, which gives them access to many universities and colleges at home and abroad. The school is located in Pinhais, a suburb of Curitiba.

== History ==
The construction of the gigantic Itaipú binational hydroelectric power station, in which ABB (then Brown, Boveri & Cie, abbreviated to BBC) and other European companies were also involved, led to many specialists from Switzerland, Germany and Austria moving to Curitiba. With them began the history of the Colégio Suíço-Brasileira de Curitiba.

In 1979, the “Associação Colégio Suíço-Brasileiro de Curitiba” was founded. The school opened in 1980. Under the patronage of the canton of Aargau, the Swiss government recognized the school in 1983. That same year, the school moved to a rented building in Curitiba's Água Verde neighborhood. The 1993 school year began with the inauguration of the new building in Pinhais. In 1995, the kindergarten section was added and in 1999 the high school building was built with several classrooms, two natural science laboratories and an assembly hall. The school also became a member of the International Baccalaureate Organization (IBO).

In 2000, the chalet for the nursery for children aged 3 to 4 was inaugurated. In the same year, the Swiss-Brazilian School of Curitiba merged with the Swiss-Brazilian School of São Paulo. In 2001, the school's first students graduated with the International Baccalaureate (IB) diploma. Since 2002, the school has had a bilingual library. In 2007, the school expanded its infrastructure with an additional cottage and new classrooms for afternoon childcare, handicrafts, maintenance and a sports hall. In 2010, the school was awarded the ISO 9001/2008 certificate. In 2018, the school began to expand with a new complex of buildings on a neighboring plot of land. The institution's new building was inaugurated in 2020.
