= Escola Suíço-Brasileira Rio de Janeiro =

Swiss-Brazilian International School Rio de Janeiro
- Portuguese: Escola Suíço-Brasileira Rio de Janeiro; French: École Suisse; German: Schweizerschule
- Barra da Tijuca, Rio de Janeiro; Brazil

Information
- Language: Portuguese; English; French; German
- Website: https://www.swissinternationalschool.com.br/en/esb-rio-de-janeiro

Escola Suíço-Brasileira Rio de Janeiro (ESB-RJ, "Swiss-Brazilian International School Rio de Janeiro"; German: Schweizerschule, French: École Suisse) is a Swiss international school in Barra da Tijuca, Rio de Janeiro. A part of the SIS Swiss International School network, it serves levels Educação Infantil until Ensino Médio (senior high school/sixth form college).

There are three bilingual divisions for students: Portuguese-English, Portuguese-German, and Portuguese-French. Students may study up to four languages, and students in the German and French divisions also study English.

Most graduates move on to attend Brazilian universities. As of 2014 the tuition is 3,500 Brazilian real per month.
