= SIS Swiss International School =

Coordinates: 47°34′07″N 7°35′57″E

- schools in Switzerland, Germany, Brazil, Italy

Information
- Motto: "Pioneering Bilingual Education Since 1999"
- Enrollment: >3,700 (2020)
- Website: www.bilingual.education, www.swissinternationalschool.ch, www.swissinternationalschool.de, http://www.swissinternationalschool.br, http://www.swissinternationalschool.it
- Source: SIS World 2017

The SIS Swiss International Schools are a group of 19 private day schools in Switzerland, Germany, Brazil and Italy offering continuous education from kindergarten through to college. As of 2024, more than 5,000 students are enrolled with the SIS.

SIS has been operating schools in Switzerland since 1999, in Germany since 2008, and in Brazil since 2011. It is a joint venture of Kalaidos Education Group (Switzerland) and Klett Group (Germany).

== Schools in Switzerland ==
Campus	Founded	Levels Offered	# of Students	Comments
Basel	1999	Kindergarten; Primary School; Secondary School; College	700	offers the cantonal and Swiss Matura and the IB
Männedorf	2009	Kindergarten; Primary School	102	
Freienbach-Pfäffikon	2016	Kindergarten; Primary School Secondary School	110	
Risch-Rotkreuz	2012	Kindergarten; Primary School Secondary School	100	
Schönenwerd	2010	Kindergarten; Primary School; Precollege	80	
Winterthur	2001	Kindergarten; Primary School	100	
Zurich	2005	Kindergarten; Primary School; Secondary School; College	272	offers the cantonal Matura and the IB
Zurich-Wollishofen	2000	Kindergarten; Primary School	230	

== Schools in Germany ==
Campus	Founded	Levels Offered	# of Students	Comments
Stuttgart-Fellbach	2008	Kindergarten; Primary School; Secondary School	426	offers the German Abitur and the IB
Friedrichshafen	2009	Kindergarten; Primary School; Secondary School	247	offers the German Abitur and the IB
Ingolstadt	2009	Kindergarten; Primary School; Secondary School	224	offers the German Abitur and the IB
Kassel	2014	Reception Class; Primary School Secondary School	184	will offer the German Abitur, IB is projected
Regensburg	2010	Kindergarten; Primary School; Secondary School	140	offers the German Abitur and the IB
Berlin	2016	Kindergarten Primary School Secondary School	250	offers the German Abitur and the IB
Frankfurt	2020	Primary School		opening 2020/2021, Secondary School is projected

== Schools in Brazil ==
Campus	Founded	Levels Offered	# of Students	Comments
Brasília	2011	Kindergarten; Primary School Secondary School	120	will offer the Brazilian ENEM, IB is projected
Rio de Janeiro; Escola Suíço-Brasileira Rio de Janeiro	2014	Kindergarten; Primary School; Secondary School; College	680	offers the Brazilian ENEM and the IB
Escola Nova by SIS Swiss International School	2022	Kindergarten; Primary School; Secondary School; College	900	offers the Brazilian ENEM and the IB

== Schools in Italy ==
Campus	Founded	Levels Offered	# of Students	Comments
Milan	2024	Kindergarten; Primary School	0	
