= Anchieta College (Porto Alegre) =

- Portuguese: Colégio Anchieta

Location
- Porto Alegre, Rio Grande do Sul; Brazil; 30°1′42″S 51°10′32″W

Information
- Former name: Colegio dos Padres
- Type: Private primary and secondary school
- Religious affiliation: Catholicism
- Denomination: Jesuit
- Patron saint: José de Anchieta
- Established: 13 January 1890; 136 years ago
- Founder: Francisco Trappe
- Director: John Claudio Rhoden
- Director-General: Fr. Jorge Álvaro Knapp, S.J.
- Staff: 300
- Gender: Coeducational
- Enrollment: 3,000
- Website: www.colegioanchieta.g12.br

The College Anchieta is a private Catholic primary and secondary school located in Porto Alegre, the capital of Rio Grande do Sul, Brazil. The institution is one of the twenty-two works of the Society of Jesus in Southern Brazil. The school has more than three thousand students and approximately three hundred members on its staff. It belongs to the Jesuit Basic Education Network of Brazil.

== History ==
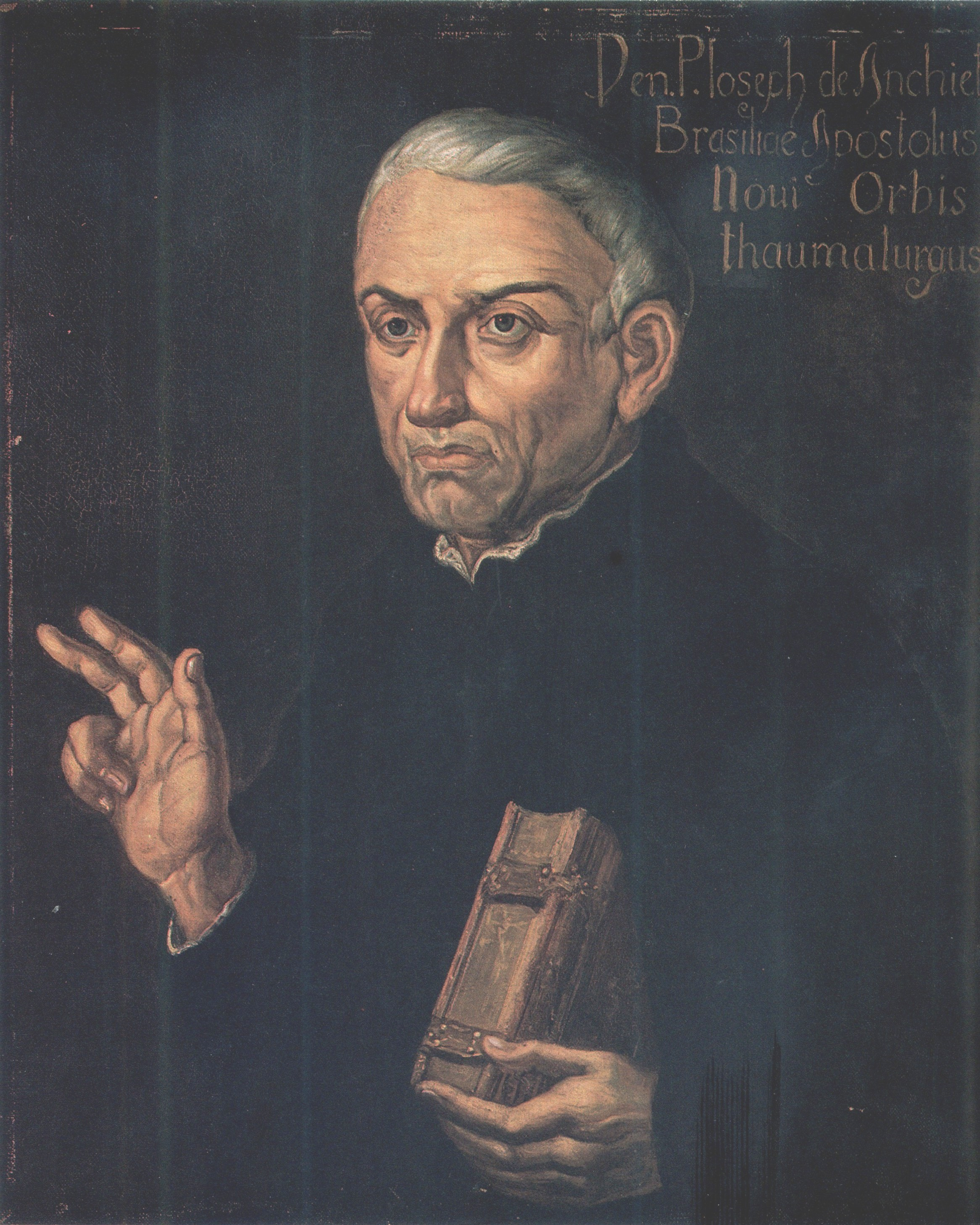
José de Anchieta

The "College of the Fathers", as it was initially known, was founded on 13 January 1890. Fr. Francisco Trappe received from Rome permission to buy the house of the Fialho family, located at Church Street (now Duque de Caxias).

In the beginning, the College of the Fathers was intended only for boys, divided into two sections, German and Brazilian. In its first year of operation, the number of students began at 42 and rose to 80. The boys were ages 9 through 12, and were only admitted if they could read.

In 1897, the College of the Fathers changed its name to St. Joseph, and then to Anchieta Gymnasium. It progressed gradually. The current name Anchieta College was adopted in 1901, at the suggestion of the then director Conrado Menz, in tribute to José de Anchieta.

Anchieta College grew and required more space than it had on Duque de Caxias Street. The growth of Porto Alegre also put pressure on the requirements. In 1954, a plot on Nile Pecanha Avenue was bought and a new school was built. A new church was added in 1967.

== List of directors ==
The Anchieta College had in all twenty-three directors, one of which took office twice. They are:

- Francisco Trappe (1890–1901)
- Roberto Fuhr (1901–1902)
- Conrado Menz (1902)
- Luiz Kadesh (1902–1904)
- Angelo Contessoto (1904–1907)
- Henry Lanz (1907–1923)
- Jorge Sedelmayr (1923–1926)
- Julio Poether (1926–1928)
- Henry Book (1928–1935)
- Alberto Fuger (1935–1940)
- Arthur Boll (1940–1946)
- Edmundo Dreher (1946–1951)
- Walter Hofer (1951–1954)
- Emilio Hartmann (1954–1958)
- José Carlos Nunes (1958–1975)
- João Roque Rohr (1975–1982)
- Eugenio Rohr (1982–1987)
- João Roque Rohr (1987–1988)
- Martin Matthias Lenz (1988–1992)
- Aegídio Körbes (1992–1996)
- Franz Stadelmann (1996–1998)
- Celso Schneider (1998) – provisionally
- Egydio Eduardo Schneider (1999–2006)
- Guido Kuhn (2006–2012)
- John Claudio Rhoden (2012 – 2019)
- Jorge Álvaro Knapp (2019 – present)

== Notable alumni ==
- Jorge Furtado, filmmaker
- Humberto Gessinger, musician
- João Goulart, the 24th President of Brazil

== See also ==
- Catholic Church in Brazil
- List of schools in Brazil
- List of Jesuit schools
