= Colégio 2 de Julho =

School in Salvador, Brazil

Coordinates: 12.9922°S 38.5163°W

Colégio 2 de Julho, or C2J, is a private school located in Salvador, Brazil. Its courses go from pre-school to highschool, which in the Brazilian educational system is usually identified with ages from 4 to 17.

Colégio 2 de Julho was founded in 1927 as the Escola Americana or American School; in 1938, its name was finally changed to 2 de Julho. The school is named after the independence date of the Brazilian state of Bahia.
