= Diocesan College (Teresina) =

- Portuguese: Colégio Diocesano

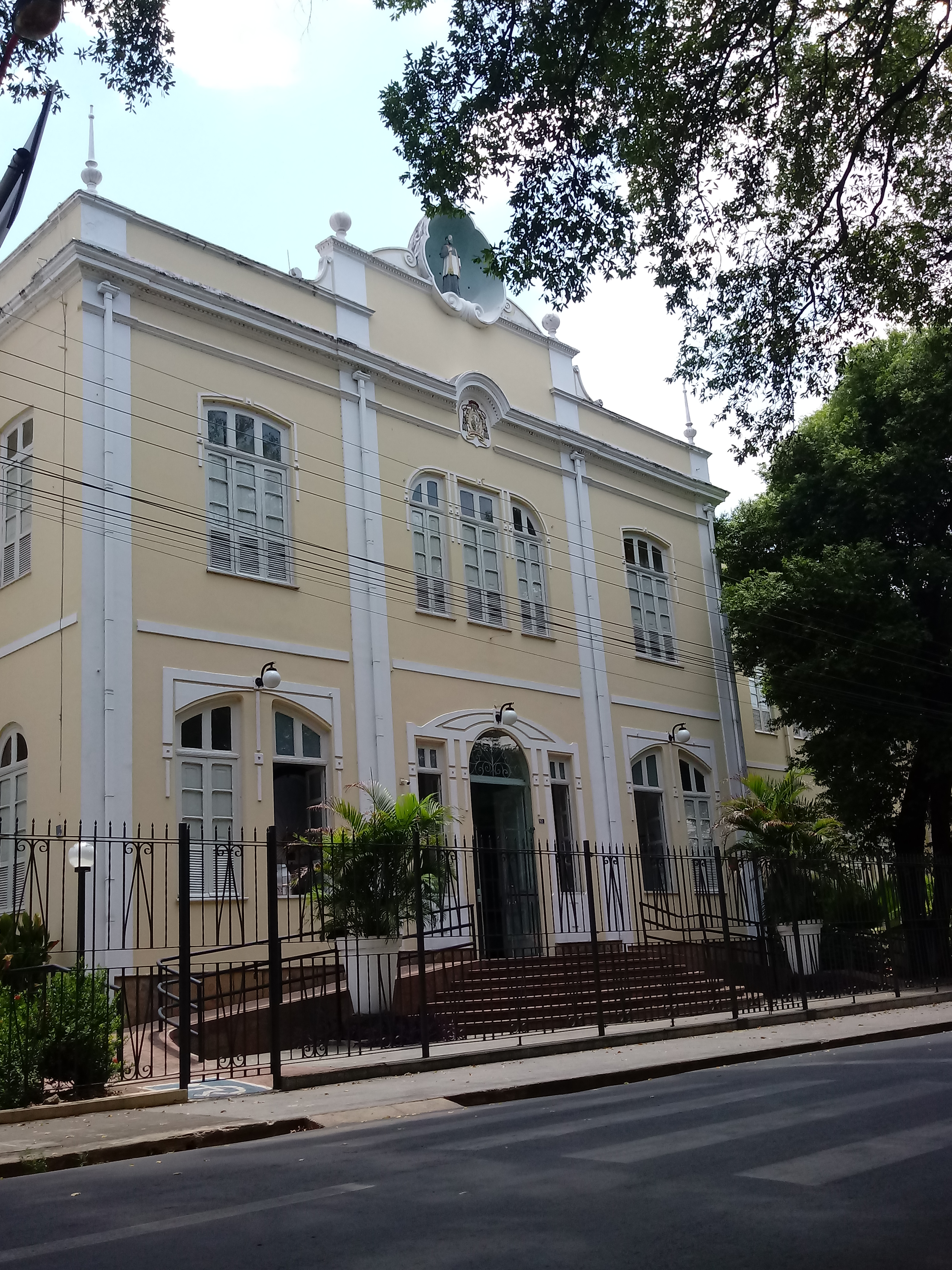

Location
- Teresina, Piauí, Brazil
- Coordinates: 5°5′40.79″S 42°48′44.65″W

Information
- Other name: College of St. Francis de Sales
- Type: Private primary and secondary school
- Motto: Educating for the beauty of peace
- Religious affiliation: Catholic
- Denomination: Jesuit
- Established: 1906 (120 years ago)
- Director: Julival Alves da Silva
- Grades: Pre-kindergarten through 11
- Gender: Coeducational
- Website: diocesano.g12.br

Diocesan College (Portuguese: Colégio Diocesano), also known as the College of St. Francis de Sales, is a private Catholic primary and secondary school located in Teresina, Piauí, Brazil. The school was founded in 1906 by the Jesuits.

Its Saraiva Square campus opened in 1925 and in 2003 a campus for two to six year olds was opened on Benjamin Constant Street.

== History ==
In 1906, the first bishop of Piauí, Antonio Joaquim D'Almeida, founded the school along with the diocesan seminary. In 1914 the second bishop of Piauí closed the school for lack of funds, and took up residence in the building which has since had his court of arms on its facade. The third bishop of Piauí, Dom Severino Vieira de Melo, reopened the school in 1925 under the name of St. Francis de Sales, running a boarding school.

In 1945, the scientific and classic courses along with the technical trade school were initiated, including a course in accounting. At this time, a group of students also founded New People magazine. In the late 1950s, the boarding house was closed.

From October 1959 until early 1960, the school had its first lay director, Bernardo Lopes de Sousa, who administered the school during the transition period until the arrival of the Jesuit fathers in 1960. Since then it has networked with Jesuit schools.

The school's children's division was opened in 2003. Today it serves more than 600 students between two and six years old.

In 2015, the school placed twelfth in Piauí state in the national secondary school examination (Exame Nacional do Ensino Médio).

== See also ==
- Catholic Church in Brazil
- Education in Brazil
- List of Jesuit educational institutions
- List of schools in Brazil
