= Cândido Júlio Bampi =

Brazilian Catholic bishop (1889-1978)

Dom Cândido Júlio Maria Bampi
- Bishop of Caxias do Sul
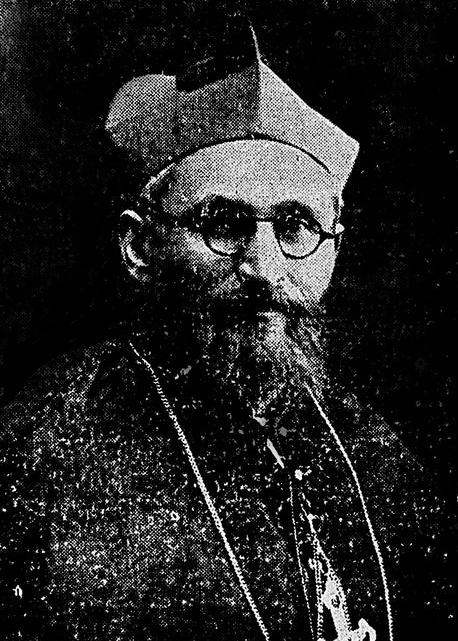
- Church: Catholic Church
- Diocese: Diocese of Caxias do Sul
- Installed: January 18, 1957
- Term ended: July 7, 1978

Orders
- Ordination: August 10, 1914
- Consecration: October 4, 1936 by João Batista Becker

Personal details
- Born: Cândido Júlio Bampi
- Died: July 7, 1978 Caxias do Sul
- Education: Doctorate in theology Graduation in canon law
- Alma mater: Pontifical Gregorian University

Cândido Júlio Bampi, stylized as Dom Frei Cândido Júlio Maria Bampi O.F.M. Cap. (Caxias do Sul, January 25, 1889 — Caxias do Sul, July 7, 1978) was a Brazilian Catholic bishop.

== Biography ==
Cândido Bampi was son of Maximino Bampi and Giácoma Cemin. The future bishop studied under the Capuchins and eventually became a member of the congregation, being received in the convents of Garibaldi, Veranópolis and Flores da Cunha. In 1914, the friar was sent to Rome, graduating in canon law and obtaining his doctorate in theology by the Pontifical Gregorian University.

Bampi was ordained a priest at August 10, 1914 at Ivrea, Italy, returning to Brazil in 1919. Bampi then occupied the roles of director of the courses on philosophy and theology at Garibaldi and professor of dogmatic theology and canon law until 1927. Interrupting his educational roles between the years of 1927 and 1932, in reason of becoming the Provincial Comissar of the regional Capuchins, he returned to them between the years of 1933 and 1936.

At June 27, 1936, Pope Pius XI was nominated titular bishop of Tlos and prelate of Vacaria. Cândido was consecrated at October 4, 1936 by João Batista Becker, archbishop of Porto Alegre together with José Baréa, bishop of Caxias do Sul and Antonio Reis, bishop of Santa Maria at the Metropolitan Cathedral of Our Lady Mother of God, Porto Alegre. Officially occupied his position as prelate of Vacaria a month later, November 4. He stayed as bishop of Vacaria for 21 years, creating new parishes, founding the Divina Providência Shelter and the Minor Seminary of Our Lady of the Olive Tree.

At January 18, 1957, Cândido Bampi was nominated by Pope Pius XII as auxiliary bishop of Diocese of Caxias do Sul, dedicating himself to the local religious communities and, in his last years, to the sacrament of penance and the practice of visiting the poor and sick.

At 1961, received the title of Vacarian Citizen.

Dom Frei Cândido participated in the four sessions of the Second Vatican Council. Suffering from old age and disease, the Franciscan chose to live at the local Convent of the Immaculate Conception.

Cândido Júlio Bampi passed away at July 7, 1978, 8h30min, being 89 years old. He was buried at St. Theresa's Cathedral, Caxias do Sul.
