= Santa Rita do Sapucaí =

- Municipality
- Santa Rita de sapucaí
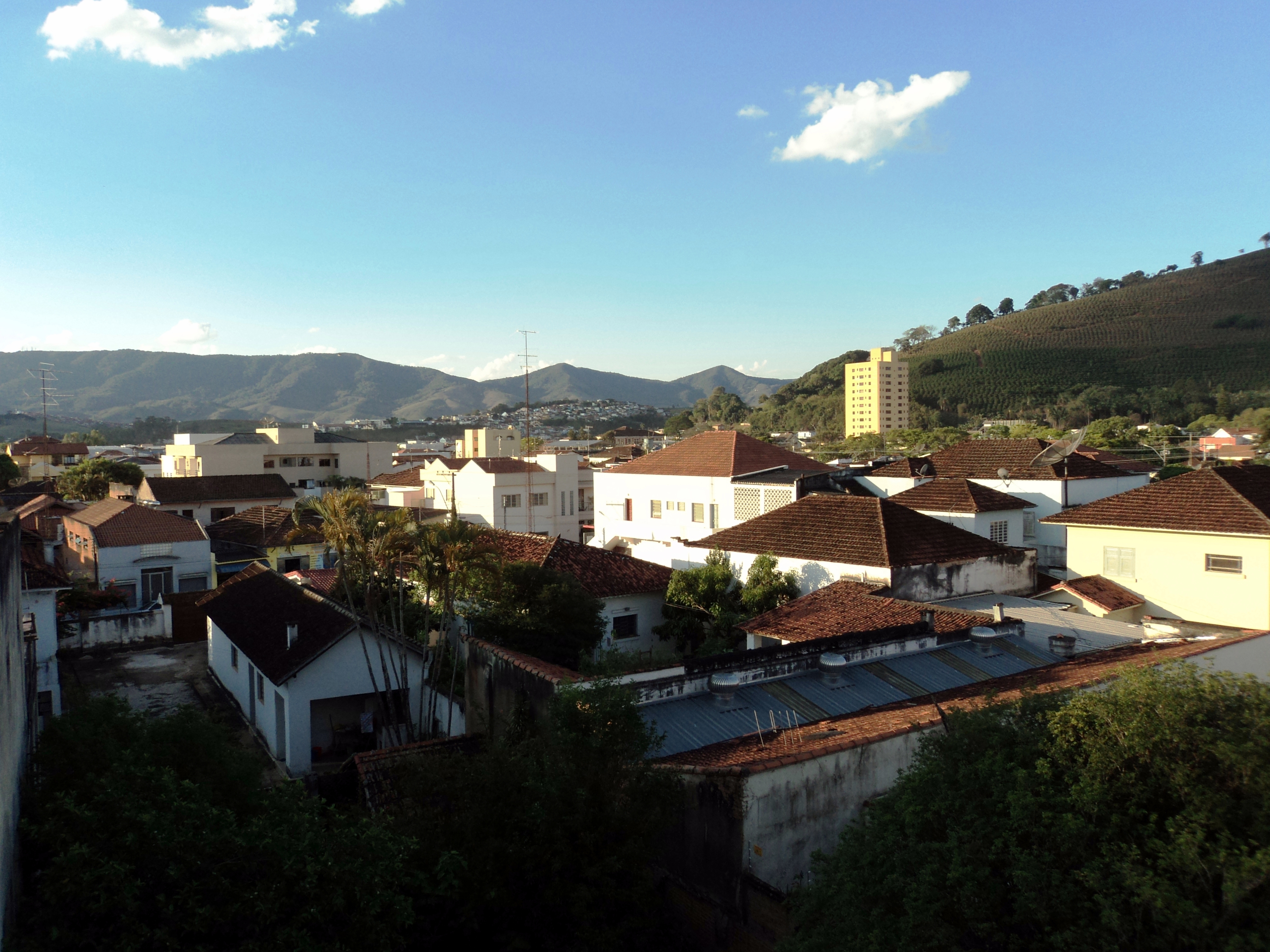

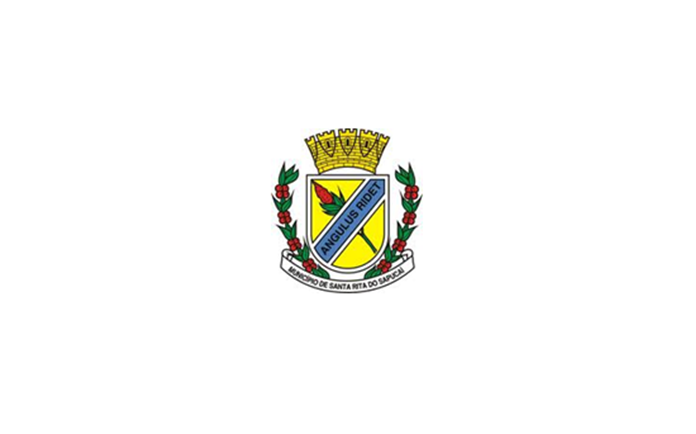
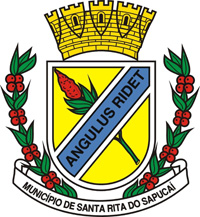
- Flag Coat of arms
- Nickname: Santa Rita
- Location in the State of Minas Gerais
- Coordinates: 22°15′07″S 45°42′10″W
- Brasil: Brazil
- Sudeste: Southeast
- Minas Gerais: Minas Gerais
- Founded: May 24, 1892

Area
  - Total: 350.874 km^{2} (135.473 sq mi)
- Elevation: 821 m (2,694 ft)

Population (2020)
  - Total: 43,753
  - Density: 123.29/km^{2} (319.3/sq mi)
- Time zone: UTC−3 (BRT)
- Postal Code: 37540-000
- Website: http://www.pmsrs.mg.gov.br/

Santa Rita do Sapucaí (Portuguese pronunciation: [ˈsɐ̃tɐ ˈʁitɐ ðu sɐpukɐˈi]) is a municipality situated in the southernmost part of the State of Minas Gerais. The city is known as the "electronic valley", since it has plenty of electronic industries, and both a technical school (ETE - Escola Técnica de Eletrônica Francisco Moreira da Costa) and a University (Inatel - Instituto Nacional de Telecomunicações) which hold courses in electronic knowledge. It also has another university – FAI, which has majors in administration and informatics.

In July 2012, Santa Rita do Sapucaí became the first jurisdiction in Minas Gerais to adopt same-sex marriage, and the first municipality in Brazil to individually legalize it. (See: Same-sex marriage in Brazil).

== History ==
Santa Rita do Sapucaí is a municipality in the southern region of Minas Gerais state (MG) in Brazil. Santa Rita is traditionally considered to have been founded on 22 May 1825, when the first mass was held in the chapel built on orders of Dona Genoveva Maria Martins da Fonseca, honoring a promise made by her late husband Manoel José da Fonseca. The Fonseca family arrived in the region in the early 19th century and is considered the founding family of Santa Rita do Sapucaí.

== Geography ==
Santa Rita is located a few hundred kilometers away from the states of Rio de Janeiro and São Paulo, in one of Minas Gerais' richest regions. It is situated between mountains and has a mild, seasonally humid climate characteristic of parts of southeastern Brazil historically covered by Atlantic Forest. Winters are generally mild and dry, springs warm and relatively dry, summers warm and wet and autumns mild and wet. It is warmer than São Paulo, but colder than Rio de Janeiro, Volta Redonda, Juiz de Fora and Belo Horizonte (Brazilians call the climate of the town tropical de altitude, which means it is mildly of subtropical for such low latitude).

The municipality contains the 305-hectare (750-acre) Santa Rita Biological Reserve, a strictly protected conservation unit created in 1980.

== Economy ==
Although located in a rich coffee-growing region, Santa Rita is known for its high technology industries, being home to one of Brazil's foremost electronic, telecommunications and computer engineering colleges, INATEL - Instituto Nacional de Telecomunicações, which was founded in 1965.

As to the Escola Técnica de Eletrônica "Francisco Moreira da Costa", the first electronic technical school of Latin América, it was founded in 1959 by lady Sinha Moreira. The city possesses today more than 110 companies of technological bases.

Santa Rita uses prisoners to power street lamps in a local plaza. Inmates are offered the opportunity to shorten their sentences by pedaling a bike that is connected to a car battery, which then are used to power the lighting grid.

== Notable people ==
- International soccer player Roque Júnior, who was in the Brazil's world champions squad of 2002, was born in Santa Rita. He also started in the local team, Santarritense.
- Olavo Bilac Pinto was president of Chamber of Deputies of Brazil in 1965 and an ambassador of Brazil in France from 1966 to 1970.
- Former Brazilian president Delfim Moreira (List of presidents of Brazil), although not being born in Santa Rita, spent much of his life there.
- Pedro Rodrigues Filho, a serial killer who claims to have made more than 100 victims, was born in Santa Rita at the Rio Sapucai shores.

== See also ==
- List of municipalities in Minas Gerais
