= Anchieta College (Nova Friburgo) =

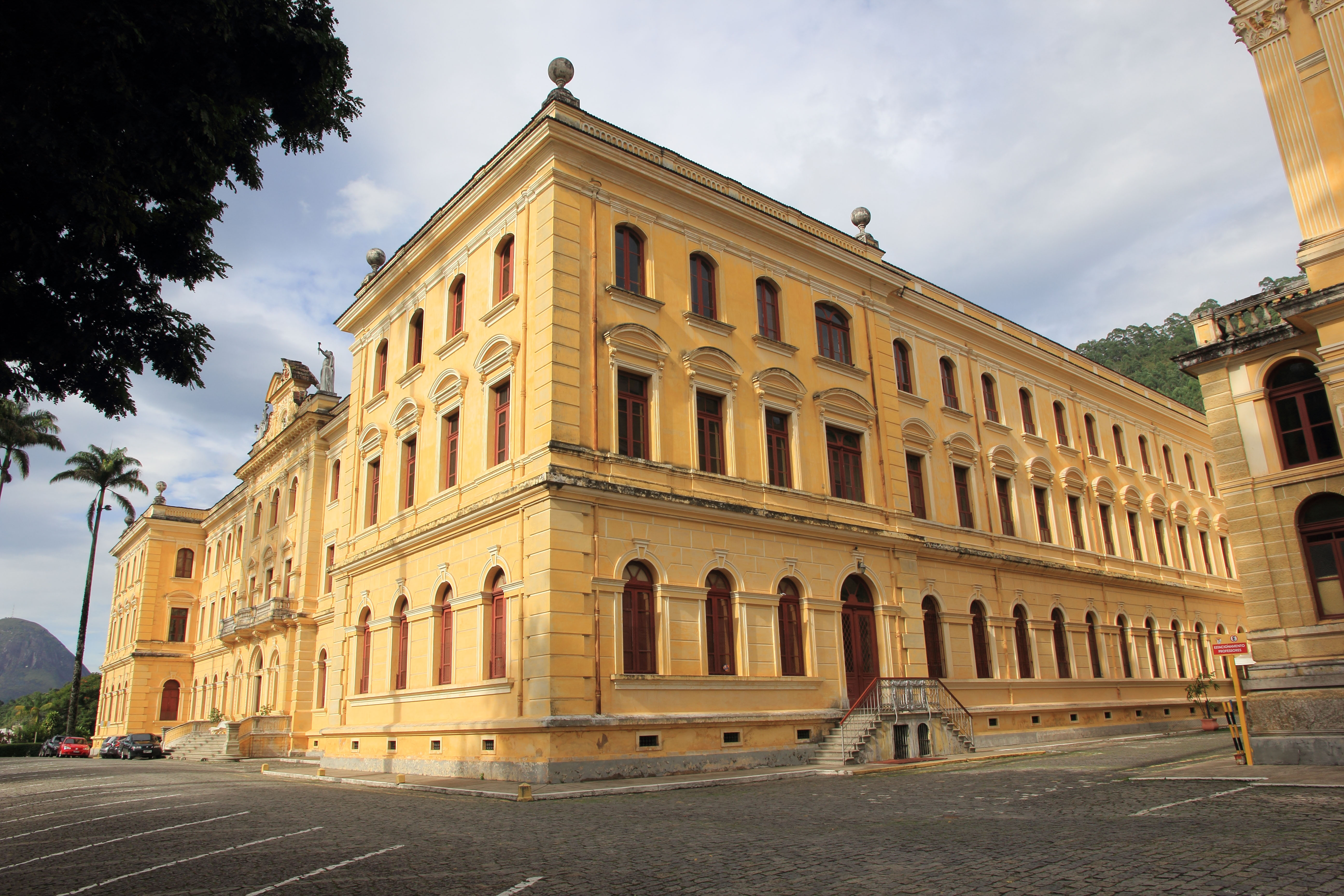

Location
- Nova Friburgo, Rio de Janeiro; Brazil
- Coordinates: 22.273957°S 42.535884°W

Information
- Type: Private primary and secondary school
- Religious affiliation: Catholic
- Denomination: Jesuit
- Established: 12 April 1886; 139 years ago
- Gender: Coeducational
- Enrollment: 900
- Website: www.colegioanchieta.org.br

Anchieta College is a private Catholic primary and secondary school located in Nova Friburgo, in the state of Rio de Janeiro, Brazil. It is named for the 16th century Jesuit missionary José de Anchieta.

In 2006, the college took 17th place nationally, 6th in the state, and 1st in Nova Friburgo in the National High School Examination (ESMS).

== History ==
Anchieta College was founded in April 1886 by Jesuit priests and brothers from the Roman Province. It is currently a part of the Central-Eastern Brazil Province of the Society of Jesus.

The College opened in a large farm house on Burn Hill, known among Swiss settlers as "The Chateau," a name still applied to it by many in the city. It began as a boarding school for students from all over Brazil.

== See also ==
- List of Jesuit sites
