= Education in Prizren =

The first Albanian-language school in Kosovo was opened in 1889. That was the birth of public education in the historical city Prizren. "The history of our education is a story of war of efforts. A story of a small number of people, with a great spiritual world, and with a strong will to be independent."

The schools closed during the war in Kosovo in the 1990s. Classes were held in private houses. After the war ended, school resumed, and from 1999 to 2007, education was brought back in two stages:

1. The emergency stage (1999-2002) - In this stage, the primary aim was rebuilding the educational system, including the school infrastructure. New schools were built, old ones repaired.
2. The development stage (2002-2007) - The stage of development and implementation of reforms in education. Teachers were trained for general and professional high schools, and new textbooks were published.

Now, after many years of development, Prizren's educational system follows basic principles similar to other European states. The students come from a variety of ethnic backgrounds: Albanian, Bosnian, Turks, Romes, and Ashkali. Classes are taught in three languages: Albanian, Bosnian and Turkish, in public and private institutions.

== Early education ==
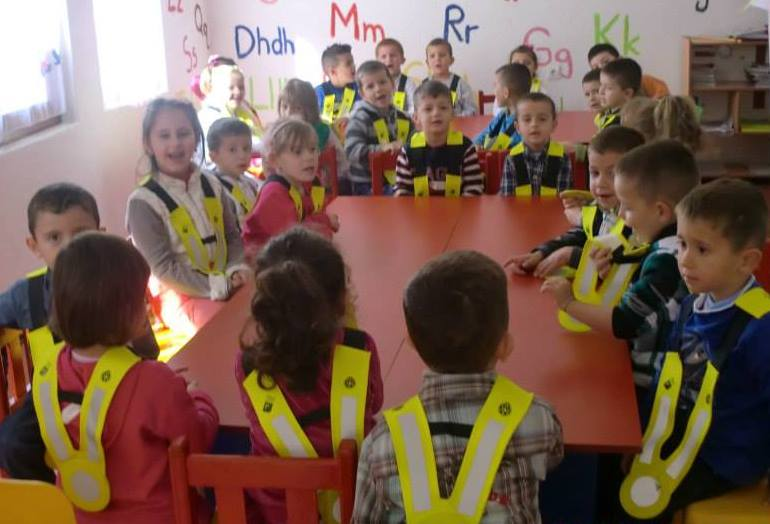
The children of the "Fluturat" kindergarten

Early education is known as preschool or pre-primary education. Based on the age of the child, there are two kinds of preschool institutions:

- preschools for children 1–3 years old;
- preschools for children 3–6 years old.

Pre-primary schools are for children 5–6 years old. Preschools are private institutions, unlike the pre-primary ones that are usually part of primary education schools. 56 pre-primary children's groups exist in Prizen. There are 1466 children, of the 667 males and 799 females. 1173 Albanians, 144 Bosnian, 34 Ashkali, 21 Romes, and 94 Turks.

== Primary and lower secondary education ==
Primary and lower secondary education includes compulsory education for nine years, in two levels:

- primary education (grades 1-5);
- lower secondary education (grades 6-9).

In Prizren there are 72 primary and lower secondary schools. 47 of them are basic schools, and 25 are separated. 49 schools are taught in Albanian, 11 in Bosnian, and 12 in other languages.

There are 1250+ classes, with nearly 27,000 students. 14,000 of them are males and 13,000 females. 2610 of them are in the first year, 2674 in the second year, 2812 in the third year, 2862 in the fourth year, 3109 in the fifth year, 3335 in the sixth year, 3315 in the seventh year, 2813 in the eighth year, and 3052 in the ninth year. Based on ethnicity, 22821 of them are Albanians, 2081 Bosnian, 498 Ashkali, 386 Romes, 992 Turks, three Egyptian, 15 others.

1. "Lidhja e Prizrenit" - Prizren
2. "Emin Duraku" - Prizren
3. "Fatmir Berisha" - Prizren
4. "Lekë Dukagjini" - Prizren
5. "Motrat Qirizi" - Prizren
6. "Fadil Hisari" - Prizren
7. "Mati Logoreci" - Prizren
8. "Mustafa Bakiu" - Prizren
9. "Abdyl Frashëri" - Prizren
10. "Ibrahim Fehmiu" - Prizren
11. "Haziz Tola" - Prizren
12. "Xhevat Berisha" - Prizren
13. "Dy dëshmorët" - Pirana
14. "Zenun Çoçaj" - Gjonaj
15. "Hysni Temaj" - Kushnin
16. "Anif Muji" - Struzha
17. "Bajram Curri" - Romaja
18. "Vëllezërit Frashëri" - Planeja
19. "Nazim Buduri" - Hoçë e qytetit
20. "Dëshmorët e Vrrinit" - Billusha
21. "Dëshmorët e Zhurit" - Zhur
22. "Sezai Surroi" - Korisha
23. "Besim Ndreca" - Lutogllava
24. "Ekrem Rexha" - Lubizhda
25. "Pjetër Budi" - Lubizhda
26. "Nefit Jusufi" - Skorobisht
27. "Mic Sokoli" - Lybeçeva
28. "Mushnikova" - Mushnikova
29. "Shtjefën Gjeçovi" - Zym
30. "H. e Lumës" - Vërmica
31. "Naim Frashëri" - Vlashnje
32. "Luigj Gurakuqi" - Nashec
33. "Mithat Frashëri" - Krajk
34. "Hasim Maliqaj" - Poslisht
35. "Idriz Seferi" - Qëndresa
36. "Ardhmëria" - Landovica
37. "Brigada 125" - Medvec
38. "Sinan Thaçi" - Zojz
39. "Zef Lush Marku" - Velezha
40. "Nazim Kokollari" - Prizren
41. "Izvor" - Lubizhda
42. "25 Maji" - Lubizhda
43. "M. Bajraktari" - Reçan
44. "Svejtlost" - Manastirica
45. "Pllanjane" - Planjanje
46. "Sharr" - Jabllanica
47. "D. e Hasit" - Kabash
48. "Genqare" - Alija

== Secondary education ==
According to the SNKA, secondary education is the third level of education. In Prizren there are six basic secondary schools and six separated secondary schools. Based on language, six schools are in Albanian, one Bosnian, and five others. There are 9608 students, 5261 males, 4347 females. In the first year, there are 1667 males and 1208 females. The second year, has 1360 males and 1286 females. In the third year, there are 1213 males, 1194 females, and in the fourth year, 1021 males and 659 females. There are 287 classes, with 33,5 students in a class. Based on ethnicity, 8135 are Albanians, 975 Bosnian, and 498 Turks. 43.1% of them are in general high schools, and 56.9% professional high schools.

=== Public high schools ===
==== General high schools ====
===== "Gjon Buzuku" High School =====
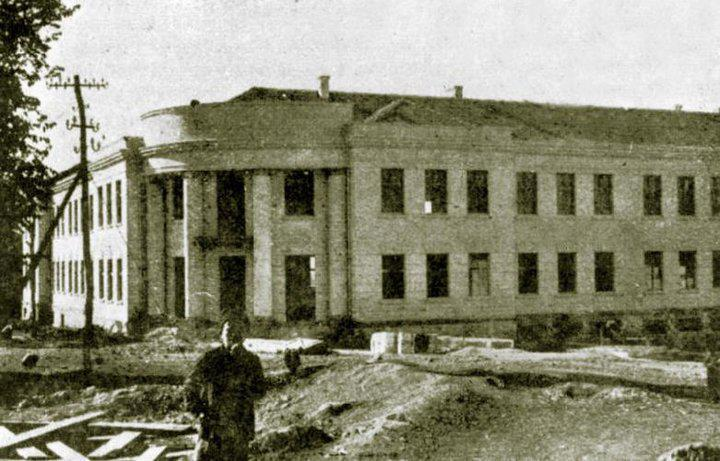
The building of the "Gjon Buzuku" high school, pre-Kosovo War.

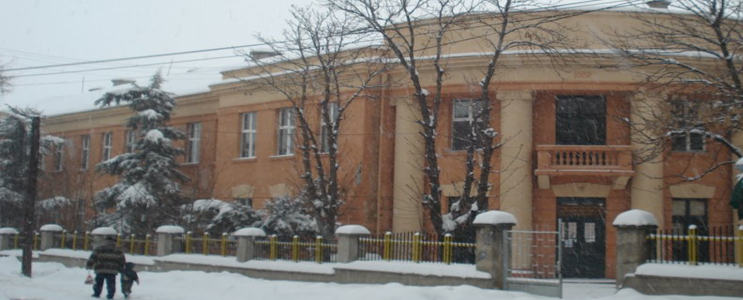
The "Gjon Buzuku" building, post-war.

"Gjon Buzuku" is a general high school with a long tradition. We can find the beginning of activities during the 70s year, XIX. In 1907, Kosovo's Serbs, with the help of the Serbian and Russian government, opened a secondary school. In November 1912, this secondary school became a general high school. Classes stopped during the First World War, but in 1919, the school started again, and in 1924 it was made a full general school. From 1919 to 1941, classes were taught in Serbian. Teaching in Albanian began on November 11, 1942. During the Kosovo War, like all the other schools at the gymnasium level, teaching continued in Serbian and Turkish. Studies in Albanian continued in private houses until the war ended. Since 1999, classes have been taught in three languages: Albanian, Bosnian and Turkish. Now there are 1980 students in the school, and 500 in separated schools, and 106 teachers. 38 classes learn in Albanian, seven in Bosnian, and six in Turkish.

The school can be separated into three education fields:

- General fields;
- Natural sciences;
- Mathematics and computing science.

Other than the main building, the "Gjon Buzuku" gymnasium is branched out into three different schools.

1. in Romajë, seven classes, 250 students, two managements: general field and social field;
2. in Gjonaj, six classes, 80 students, two managements: general field and natural sciences field;
3. in Reçan, three classes, natural sciences field.

The school council is made up of senior students in addition to the rector, deputy director, and administrator.

===== "Remzi Ademaj" High School =====
"Remzi Ademaj" is a general high school. It was a part of "Gjon Buzuku" general high school but has recently separated. It has two managements:

1. Social sciences field;
2. Languages field.

==== Professional high schools ====
===== "11 Marsi" Technical High School =====
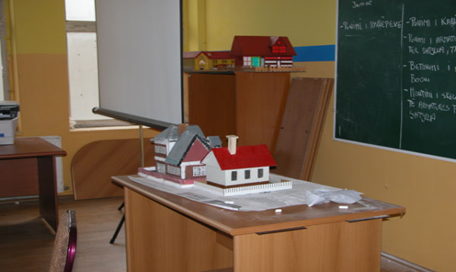
A practice work made by one of the technical school "11 Marsi" students.

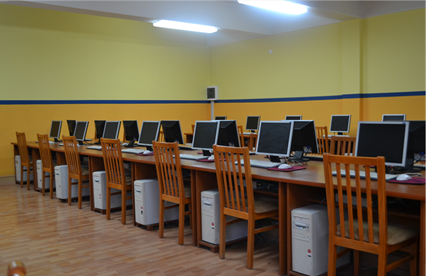
The computer cabinet of the 11 Marsi school.

The technical high school, "11 Marsi" in Prizren, was founded in 1967. The first course that was taught there was construction. Classes were in Albanian until 1991. Due to war during the 90s, the school was held in private houses. Only after the end of the war could the students return to their regular school. The school has a total of 2210 students; ethnically 1357 (89,27%) are Albanian, 95 (6,25%) Bosnian, 52 (3,42%) Turks, 12 (0,79%) Romani, and four (0,27%) Ashkali. Lectures are held in three languages: 1397 students in Albanian, 77 students in Bosnian, and 46 in Turkish. The school teaches in a variety of fields:

- electronics:
  - computing;
  - electrician;
  - telecommunication;
  - audio and video.
- machinery fields:
  - blacksmith;
  - installation of water and sewer;
  - installation of heating and air conditioning;
  - mechanic.
- construction:
  - architecture;
  - geodesy.
- applied arts:
  - textile design;
  - graphic design.
- traffic
  - road traffic.

===== "Ymer Prizreni" Economic High School =====
The economical high school "Ymer Prizreni" was founded in 1945 as a teachers' school. In 1956 it was named "Dimitrie Tucović" and continued training teachers till 1974. For the next four years, it functioned as a normal school. In 1992 the school was designated as the "Ymer Prizreni" Economic High School. Now the school has 1708 students, 642 of them females and 1066 males. 1470 of them are Albanians, 184 Bosnian, 54 Turkish. The school has these education fields:

- economic fields:
  - accounting;
  - bank insurance;
  - retail and wholesale trade;
  - freight forwarder;
  - business administration.
- law:
  - juristic assistant;
  - administration assistant.
- food technology
  - plant-derived food technology.
- hotels:
  - assistant restaurant.

===== "Luciano Motroni" medical high school =====
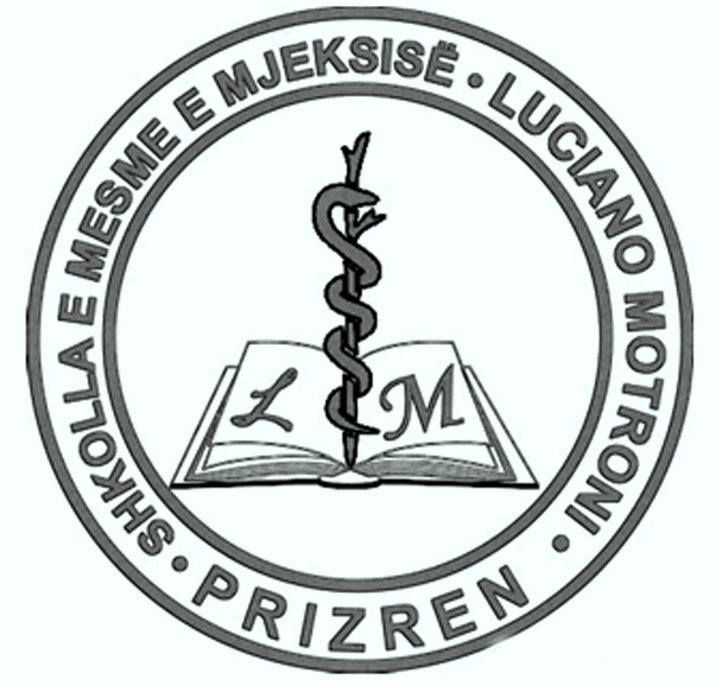
The logo of the "Luciano Motroni" school.

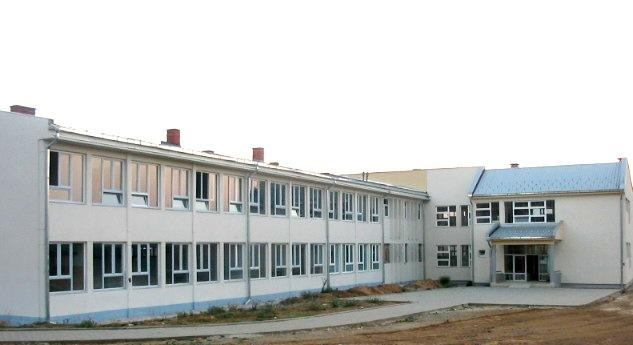
The building of the Luciano Motroni Medical High School.

The medical high school "Luciano Motroni" was created as part of the "Gjon Buzuku" Gymnasium. It was made an independent school by the decision of the municipality on June 30, 1964. In 1990 the final ethnic separation occurred, and students and teachers moved from the school territory for political reasons. After the Kosovo War (October 16, 1999), Albanians moved back to the school. Besides the Albanian language, the lectures in the "Luciano Motroni" school were held in the Bosnian and Turkish language. Now the medical school "Luciano Motroni" teaches classes in these fields:

- Medical (General)
- Nurse
- Fitness
- Pediatrics
- Pharmacy
- Gynecology
- Dentistry

===== "Lorenc Antoni" music school =====
The musical school "Lorenc Antoni" was founded on 25 October 1947 as a primary education school. In 1948 it became a music high school. At that time, there were few teachers of music. The ministry of culture of Serbia sent the professor of the music academy, Josip Sllavenski, to see if conditions were right to found a musical school. When Sllavenski arrived in Prizren, he met the musicians of the city. A day after that, he went to Zhur, and then he heard an instrumentalist group playing and saw a group playing folk dance. He contacted Lorenc Antoni and wrote a letter to the Serbian culture ministry, to let the school open. The first director of the school was Lorenc Antoni, one of the best Albanian artists, after whom it is named.

=== Religious high schools ===
==== Madrasah "Alauddin" ====
The madrasah "Alauddin" started its work based on the plan from the Islamic community (KBI). This was the first madrasah to hold lectures in the Albanian language. The madrasah opened its first sections in Prizren in 1993, then later in Gjilan. During the period 1996/96, the madrasah had 132 students (in three years). During 1997/98, another section was opened for girls, with 25 students. Although the school was damaged by Serbian troops during the war, it reopened in June 1999. During these years of the madrasah's activity and until the end of 2009/10, 2750 people finished their studies.

=== Private high schools ===
==== Mehmet Akif School ====
Mehmet Akif School (formerly: Mehmet Akif College) was founded in February 2000 in Pristina by a group of parents and educators to contribute to the education of Kosovo. The Prizren branch of the school was opened in the year 2006. It offers a challenging education to students focusing both on academic achievement and personal growth, regardless of religion, race, nationality, or sex. More than 90% of the graduating seniors enter universities and institutions of higher learning worldwide. The Mehmet Akif College has a variety of extracurricular activities, clubs, sports, and field trips. A strong academic program, centered around the traditional core disciplines, prepares students for entrance into universities, or other institutions providing tertiary education.

==== Loyola Gymnasium ====
See: Loyola Gymnasium Prizren

== University education ==
=== University of Prizren "Ukshin Hoti" ===
The University of Prizren (Albanian: Universiteti i Prizrenit) is a public university originally established in 1962 as the High Pedagogical Institute (Shkolla e Lartë Pedagogjike - SHLP). It was re-established in 2010 under the present name. It offers bachelor's degrees and master's degrees in different fields. Now the University of Prizren works in these fields:

- Lecturer / Coaches / Assistants
- Management / Leadership / Organizational Behavior;
- Economics / Quantitative Methods - Finance / Accounting - Computer Science - Creative Media / Development playgrounds - Tourism / Hospitality;
- Public Administration / Local Economic Development;
- Political Science / International Relations;
- Law - English Language - Academic writing, research and study skills Method;

=== Private universities ===
==== "Universum" University College ====
Universum is a business university founded in 2004. Two years ago it was one of 3% of the best business schools in the world. Now Universum works in these education fields:

- Management / Leadership / Organizational Behavior;
- Economics / Quantitative Methods;
- Finance / Accounting;
- Computer Science;
- Creative Media / Development Playgrounds;
- Tourism / Hospitality;
- Public Administration / Local Economic Development;
- Political Science / International Relations;
- Law;
- English Language;
- Academic writing, research methods and study skills.

==== "Business" University College ====
The college "Biznesi" is an institution founded in 2004. It is licensed by the Ministry of Science Education and Technology in Kosovo. It currently has 1350 active students, 650 bachelor students and 80 masters students.

== Education with special needs ==
=== "Mother Teresa" ===
The scholastic center for the rehabilitation of people with disabilities opened in January 1950, in Mitrovica, as a boarding school. It was called "The school for hearing disabilities." In January 1951, a decision was made to open a sister school, which now represents a modern, fully functional school offering:

1. Integrated kindergarten pre-elementary preparation.
2. Elementary school/grade I-V.
3. Middle school VI-IX.
4. High school X-XII.
5. A dramatory with a capacity to hold 100 students

== See also ==
- Prizren
- League of Prizren
- University of Prizren
- Geography of Prizren
