= University of Prizren =

Public university located in Prizren, Kosovo

Coordinates: 42.206°N 20.726°E

University of Prizren "Ukshin Hoti"
- Universiteti i Prizrenit "Ukshin Hoti"
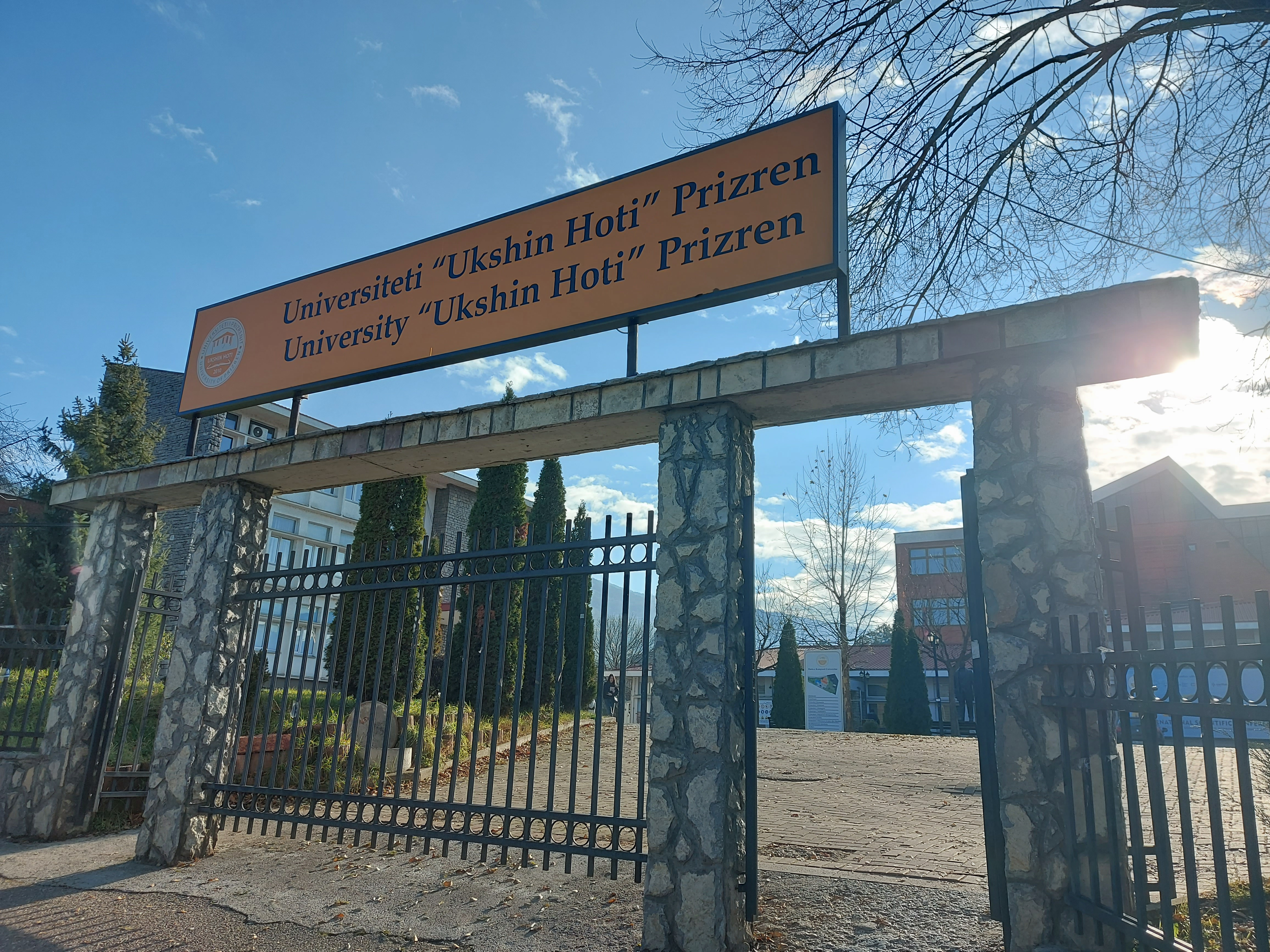
- The gate to the University campus
- Type: Public
- Established: 7 December 1962 (SHLP); 1 October 2010 (UPZ)
- Rector: Mentor Alishani
- Academic staff: 197
- Students: c. 4,035 (2020)
- Location: Prizren, Kosovo
- Campus: Urban
- Colours
- Website: uni-prizren.com

The University of Prizren (Albanian: Universiteti i Prizrenit; Latin: Universitas Prizreniensis) is a public university located in Prizren, Kosovo. It was originally established in 1962 as the High Pedagogical Institute (Albanian: Shkolla e Lartë Pedagogjike, SHLP). It was re-established in 2010 under the present name. It offers bachelor degrees and master degrees in different fields.

== History ==
University of Prizren is inherited from the High Pedagogical Institute which was established in 1962. The present form of the University started in 2010 with the decision number 01/87 of the government of Kosovo. Studies are mainly offered in the Albanian language. Minority languages Bosnian and Turkish are also offered in the Faculty of Education and Faculty of Computer Sciences.

== Faculties and departments ==
- Faculty of Economics
  - Business Administration
  - International Management
  - Accounting and Auditing
- Faculty of Law
  - Law
- Faculty of Computer Science
  - Information Technologies and Telecommunication
  - Software Design
  - Computer Science and Communication Technologies
- Faculty of Philology
  - Albanian Language and Literature
  - English Language and Literature
  - German Language and Literature
- Faculty of Education
  - Primary Education
  - Preschool Education
- Faculty of Life and Environmental Sciences
  - Forest and Environmental Sciences
  - Agribusiness
  - Agribusiness Management

== See also ==
- Education in Prizren
- University of Pristina
- Monumental Complex of the Albanian League of Prizren
