= Luciano Motroni =

Kosovan surgeon of Italian descent (1905–1989)

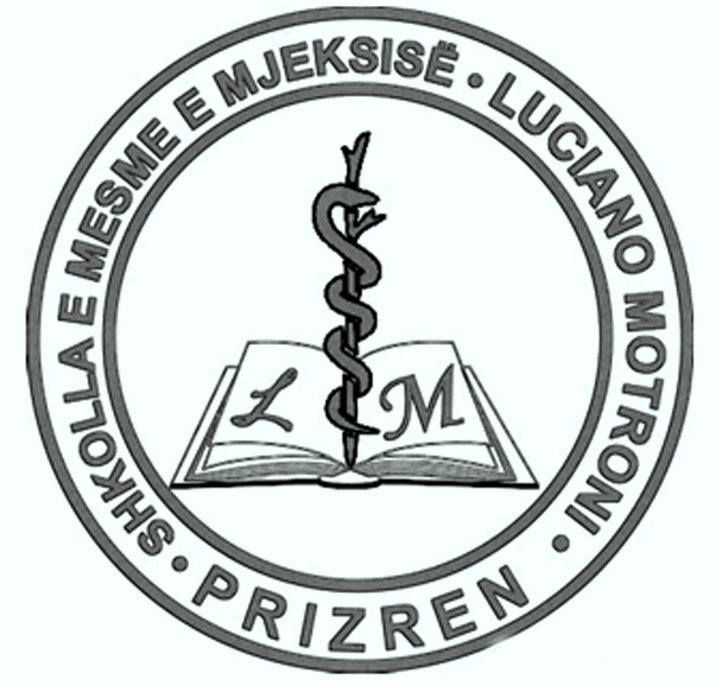
The logo of the "Luciano Motroni" school in Prizren

Luciano Motroni (1905–1989) was a Kosovan surgeon of Italian descent. He made a significant contribution in the field of education and professional advancement of medical personnel in Prizren, Kosovo.

== Biography ==
Luciano Motroni was born in 1905 in Livorno, Italy, where he also completed his primary and secondary education. He pursued his medical studies in Rome, graduating in 1930. He initially worked as a surgeon in Rome and later continued his surgical profession in Durrës, Albania. In February 1942, he moved to the city of Prizren where he worked and lived until the end of his life. He worked as a surgeon at Prizren Hospital until his retirement in 1974. Throughout his 32-year career at Prizren Hospital, he performed various surgeries not only in the field of general surgery but also in orthopedics, urology, and gynecology, without a fixed schedule. He also excelled in the field of education and the professional advancement of young medical professionals. He died in 1989 in Prizren. In recognition of his contribution to the development of medicine and professional medical education, a high school in Prizren bears his name.

== See also ==
- Education in Prizren
