= Geography of Prizren =

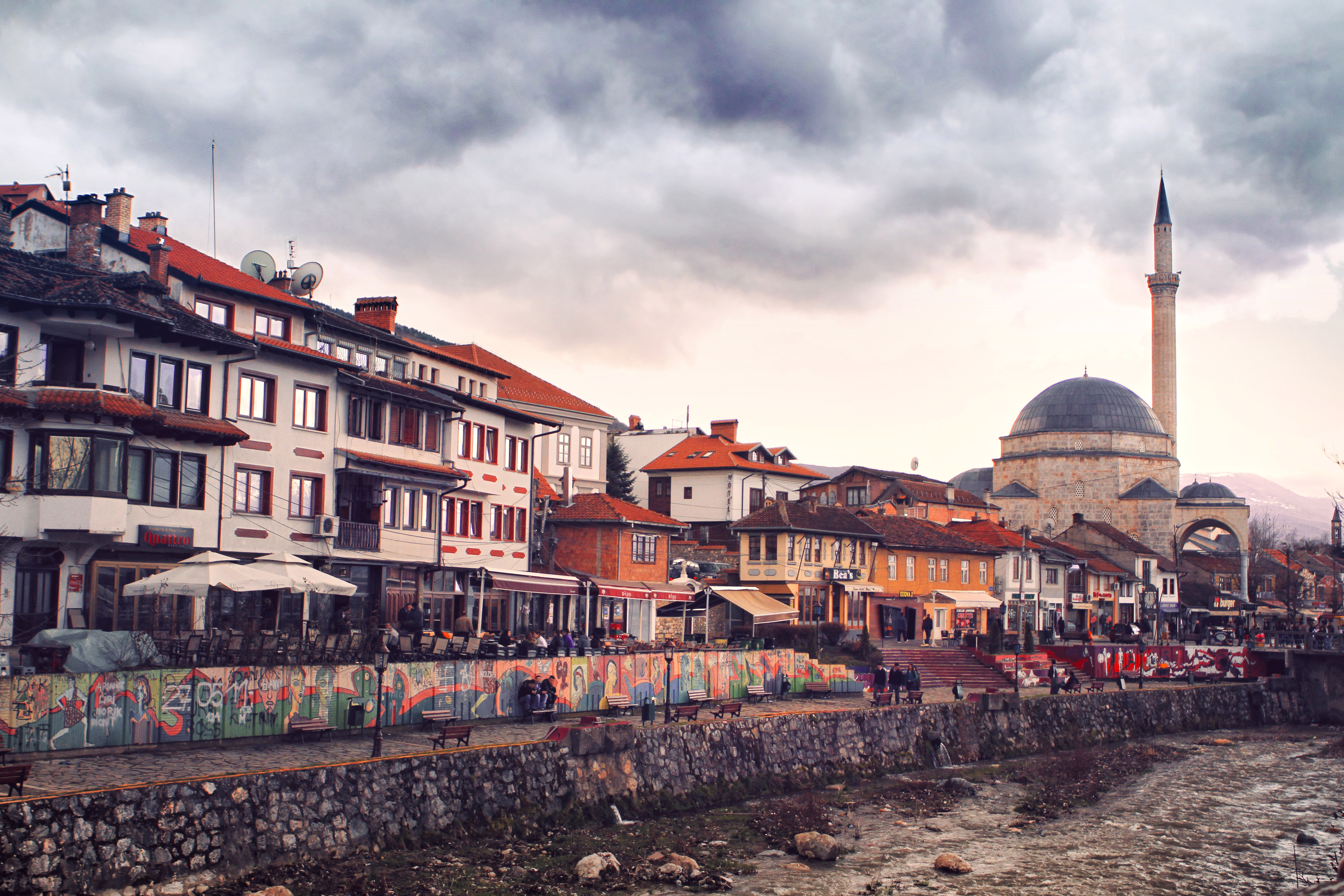
The city of Prizren.

Prizren is located on the slopes of the Sharr Mountains in the southern part of Kosovo. The municipality has a border with Albania and North Macedonia.

== Geographical characteristics ==
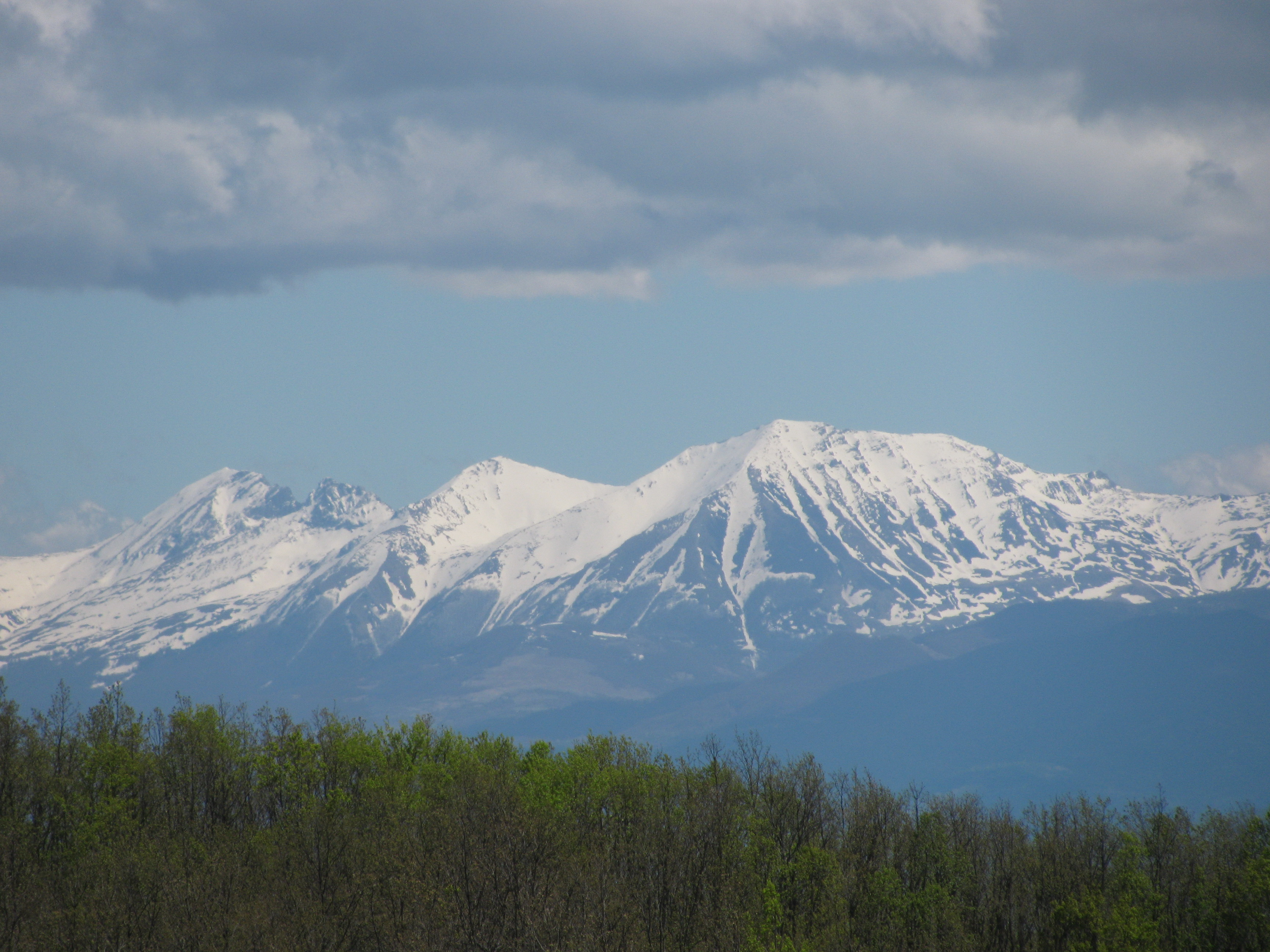
Malet e Sharrit nga Radoniqi

Prizren municipality with an area of 640 km^{2} (5.94% of Kosovo’s surface) located in south-western Kosovo has 76 settlements with 220,776 inhabitants of whom 110,000 are Prizren’s local inhabitants.

The most populated villages of the municipality of Prizren are:

- Zhur/Žur (population: 5,909)
- Korishë/Koriš (population: 5,279)
- Gjonaj/Gonj (population: 4,818)

Geographical and regional position of Prizren can best be examined with analysis of his position in relation to Kosovo, and Dukagjini’s area. Kosovo contains areas of Kosovo and Dukagjini.

Good geographical position, regional and rich natural resources, historical wealth of cultural artifacts form the basis of tourism development in the municipality of Prizren. Prizren is an ancient city located along Sharr Mountains and along the river Lumbardhi. The topography of Prizren has got a corrugated structure. Elevation ranges from 300 to 2,600 m within the boundaries. While the city center is focused on flat surfaces, hilly topography is observed along the western side, especially along the eastern side.

Forest surfaces in Prizren are rich with endemic plant reserves especially the Bosnian pine. Forest surfaces in the National Park "Sharri Mountains " are known with natural values. The total area of the municipality of Prizren is 63,986 ha. 53% of this surface is agricultural land, 39% of forests and 8% others.

== Hydrography ==
From the total amount of precipitation that falls in the territory of Kosovo, in Dukagjini region fall about 800 mm in 1m^{2} of the surface, while in Kosovo, about 600 mm in 1m^{2}. With rivers flows about 40 % of precipitation, while about 60 % evaporates. The amount of water that flows into rivers is greater in late autumn and spring, and lower in summer and winter. The ratio between the maximum and minimum amounts of water flowing into Drini i Bardhe is 8:1.

Maximum flow of water in rivers coming from Sharr Eastern Albanian Alps, can sometimes be in late autumn ( November and December ), when these regions have uninterrupted rainfall for several days. Otherwise, due to the long and dry summer, with autumn rainfalls there is not much water in these rivers, while the underground reserves in the mountains are not filled up.

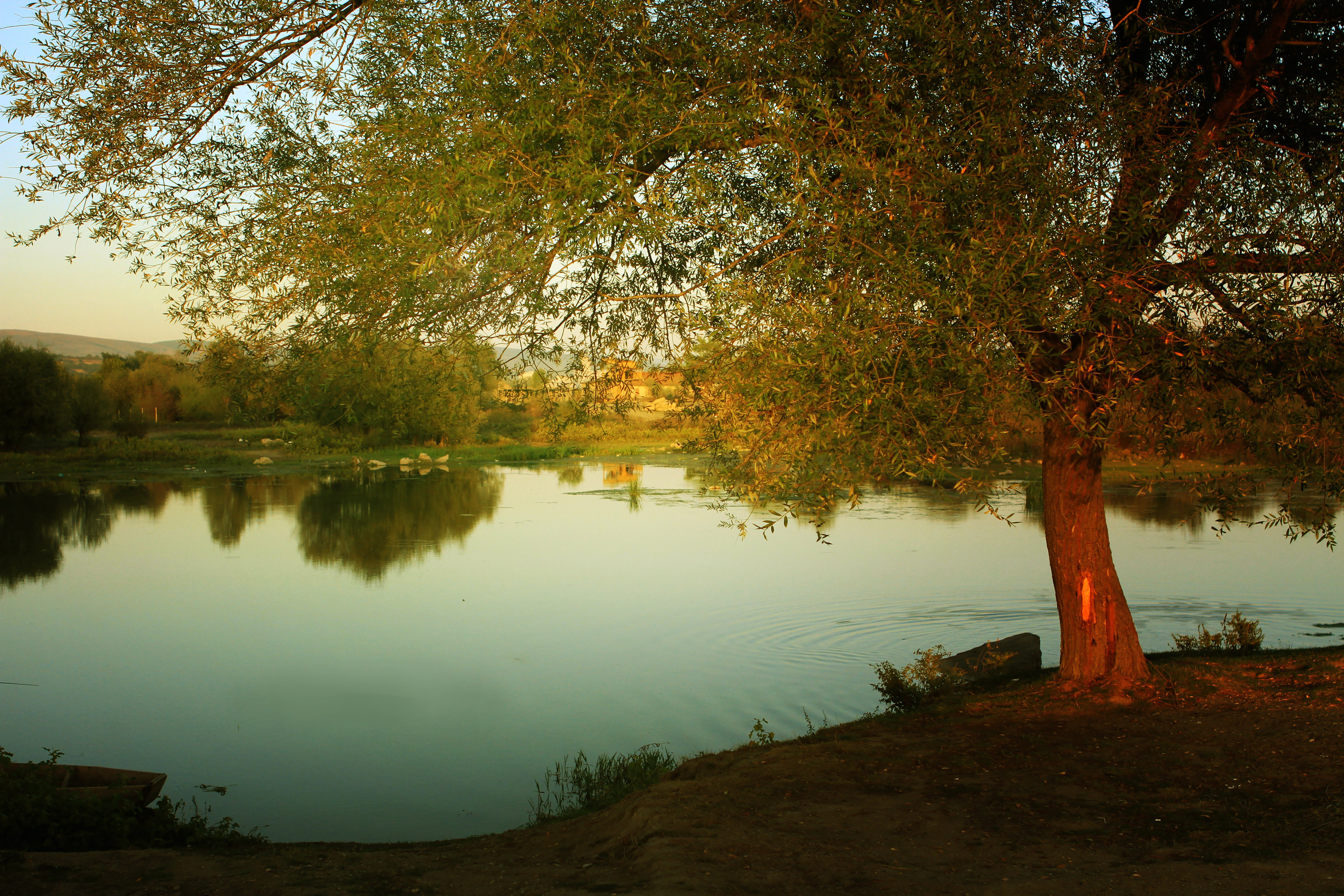
Drini i bardhe

Name of the River	Length in km	Surface in km²
Drini i Bardhe/Beli Drim	122	4.622
Sitnica	90	2.873
Lumëbardhi i Pejës	62	4.249
Morava e Binqës/Binačka Morava	60	1.552
Lepenci/Lepenac	53	6.790
Erenik	51	5.103
Ibri/Ibar	42	1.155
Lumëbardhi i Prizrenit/Prizrenska Bistrica	31	2.626

=== Rivers and river basins ===
Hydrography of the watercourses of Kosovo is divided into four river basins:

- Drini i Bardhe
- Ibri
- Morava e Binçës
- Lepenci.

The longest and the most important river in Prizren is Drini i Bardhe( 122 km ), while Prizren Lumëbardhi is smaller with 31 km. All rivers flow into the Drini i Bardhe river. The average length of the branches of Drini i Bardhe is along the 45.8 km.

Along the center of Prizren passes the Lumbardhi River which is 35 km long.

Toplluha/Topluga River with a length of 37 km was declared as the river with the biggest risk of flooding.

River Flow
1. Black Sea watershed (50.7%)
2. Adriatic Sea watershed (43.5%)
3. Aegean Sea watershed (5.80%)

=== Watersheds ===
Much of the territory of Kosovo belongs to the Black Sea basin, the rest, slightly smaller belongs to the Adriatic Sea basin and the remaining part belongs to the Aegean Sea basin.

- Rivers that belong to the Black Sea watersheds are: Sitnica, Ibri/Ibar, Drenica, Llapi, Morava e Binçes/ Binačka Morava and Krivareka.
- Rivers that belong to the Adriatic Sea watershed are: Drini i Bardhe with branches of the river of Istočka Bistrica, Pećka Bistrica, Dečanska Bistrica, Erenik, River of Prizren/Prizrenska Bistrica, Toplluha/Topluga, Mirusha, Klina and River of Plava, of Restelica.
- Rivers that belong to the Aegean Sea watersheds are: Lepenci and Nerodimka.

Despite the larger area that belongs to the Black Sea basin, the rivers of the Adriatic Sea basin have large amounts of water, because on the basin of Drini i Bardhe falls greater amount of rainfall, then because of the high mountains, in which during winter falls even more snow, which melts in the spring months.

== Borders ==
Prizren borders with municipalities such as: Gjakovë, Rahovec, Shtërpcë, Suharekë, Dragash and in national borders with Albania and North Macedonia. For this reason Prizren’s region is located at an altitude of about 400 meters and some of Sharri Mountains reach the height 2000 m above sea level. They are surrounded by almost all sides with high mountains and present a set of clearly separated. Dukagjini’s and Kosovo’s areas are in the middle part of the Balkans.

Prizren municipality borders in the north with municipalities of Suhareka/Suva Reka and Rahovec/ Orahovac, in the south of this municipality with Dragash, in the east with Shtërrpcë/Štrpce and in west borders with the Republic of Albania.Prizren is located off the European highway network. Many traffic routes pass through its territory.

However, natural predispositions provide favorable opportunities for connecting with neighboring regions more distant, while forming qualitative connections Prizren will have a much better position for both tourist and freight flows as more efficient connection and integration into wider spaces such as Kosovo, Albania, North Macedonia, other border regions, and Europe.

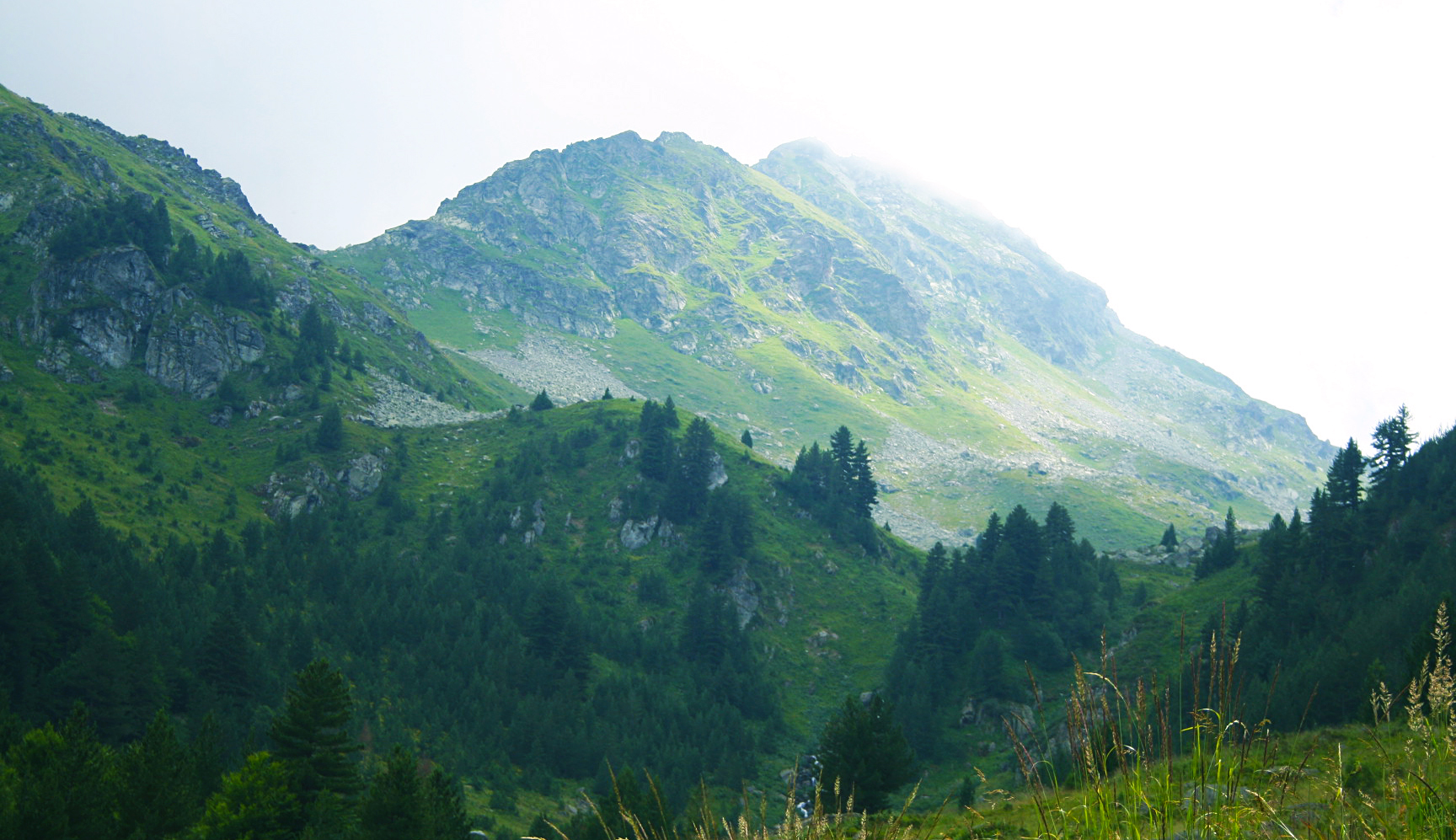
Mountains in Prevalla

== Climate ==
The climate of the city is extremely varied. In low areas due to the influence of the Mediterranean climate and very hot summers crops are among the first in Southeastern Europe with the incomparable advantages for agricultural crops: grape vines, fruit and vegetables.

In rural regions, Alpine climate dominates, because until June into holes there are still several pieces of snow left where in the middle of the summer the top of mountains are full of snow. This type of configuration gives preconditions for wealth and other resources, for example:

- Based on the amount of water it is one of the richest towns.
- This position creates all the preconditions for the development of agricultural crops, livestock, industrial food and tourism based on the model of Austria, Slovenia, Switzerland.
- Through Prizren side passes the shortest route that unites the central part of the Balkans with the Adriatic Sea.

== Historical conditions ==
Historical conditions in earlier periods were not in a very good position relative to major traffic centers. Also there was not enough openness towards neighboring regions like Albania, Montenegro, North Macedonia, causing Prizren not to use advantages that it has from pedological ground composition, climatic conditions of the Mediterranean climate and hydrological conditions for the development of agriculture and natural conditions for developing tourism and recreational activities. All this has affected the economic structure of Prizren. According to the Spatial Plan of Kosovo, Prizren is known as a city museum, including antique values, cultural, historic and attractive development activities such as education, trade, tourism, agriculture, light food production, textile, pharmaceutical industry, etc.

== Gallery ==
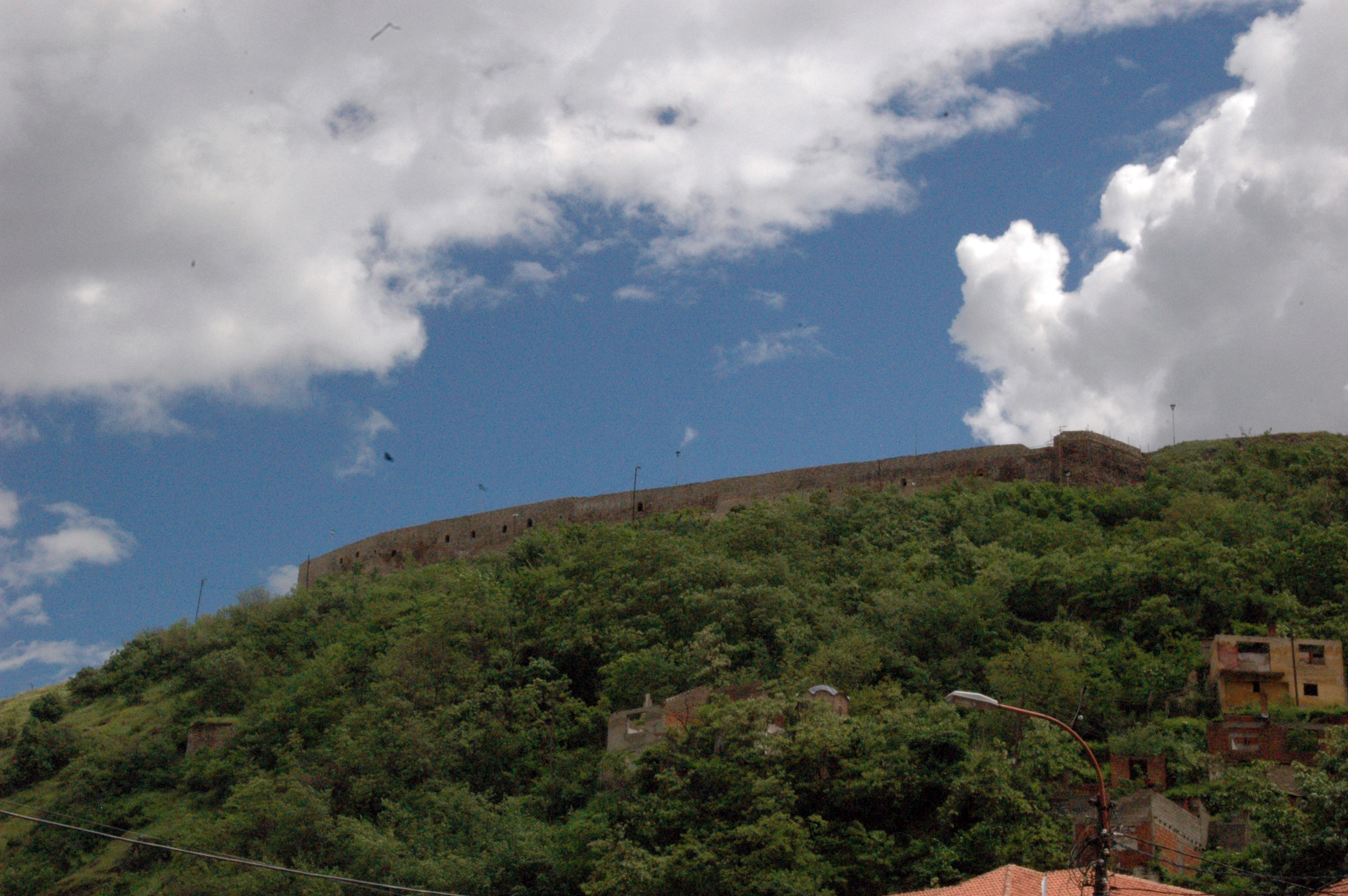

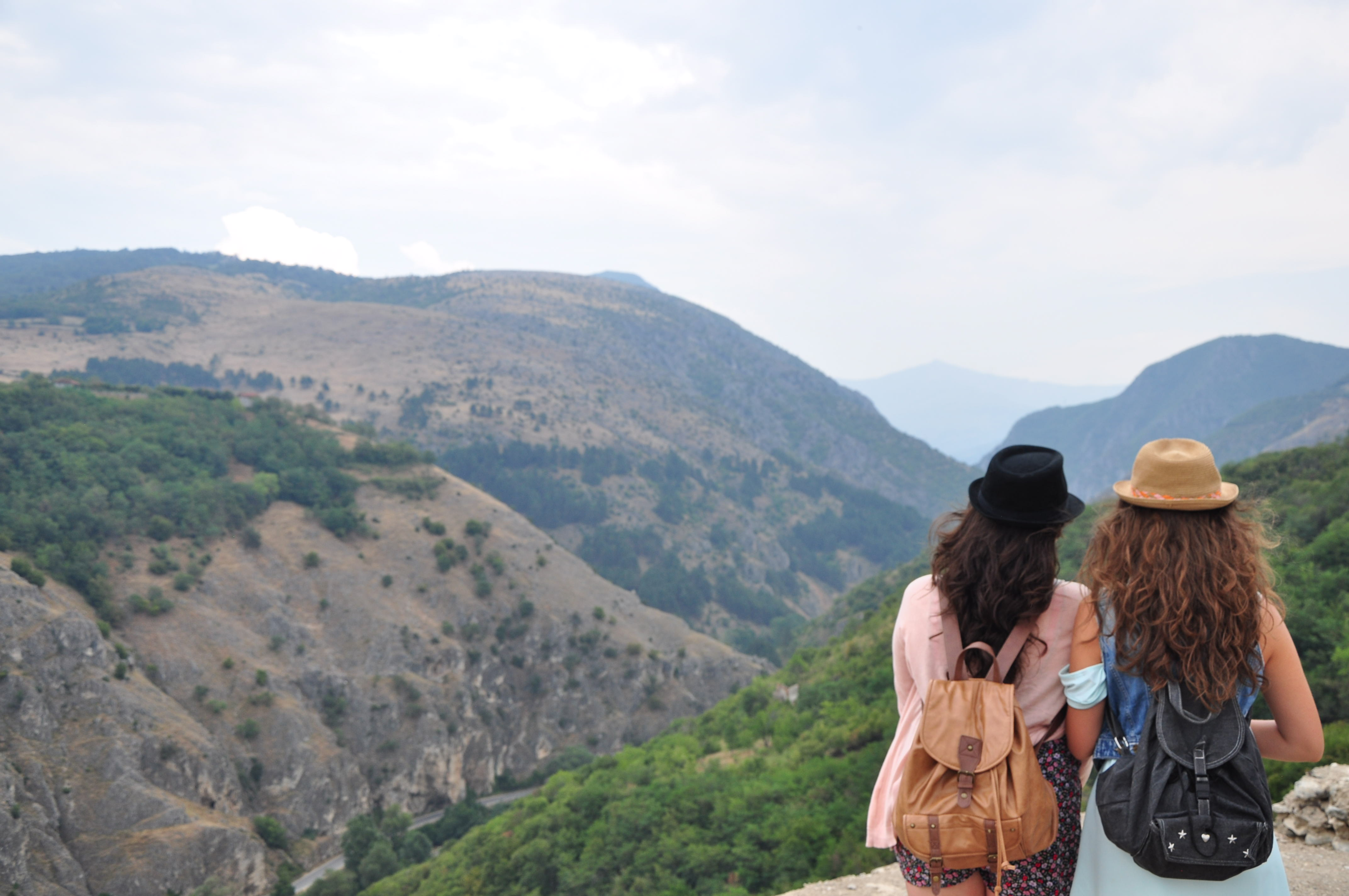

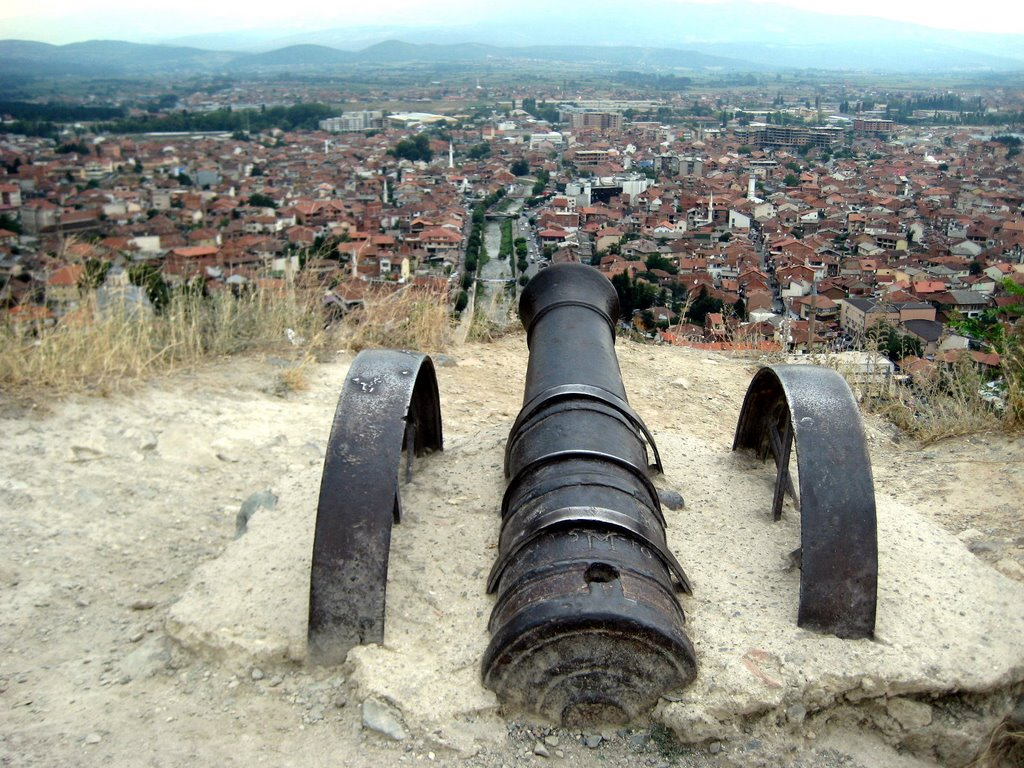

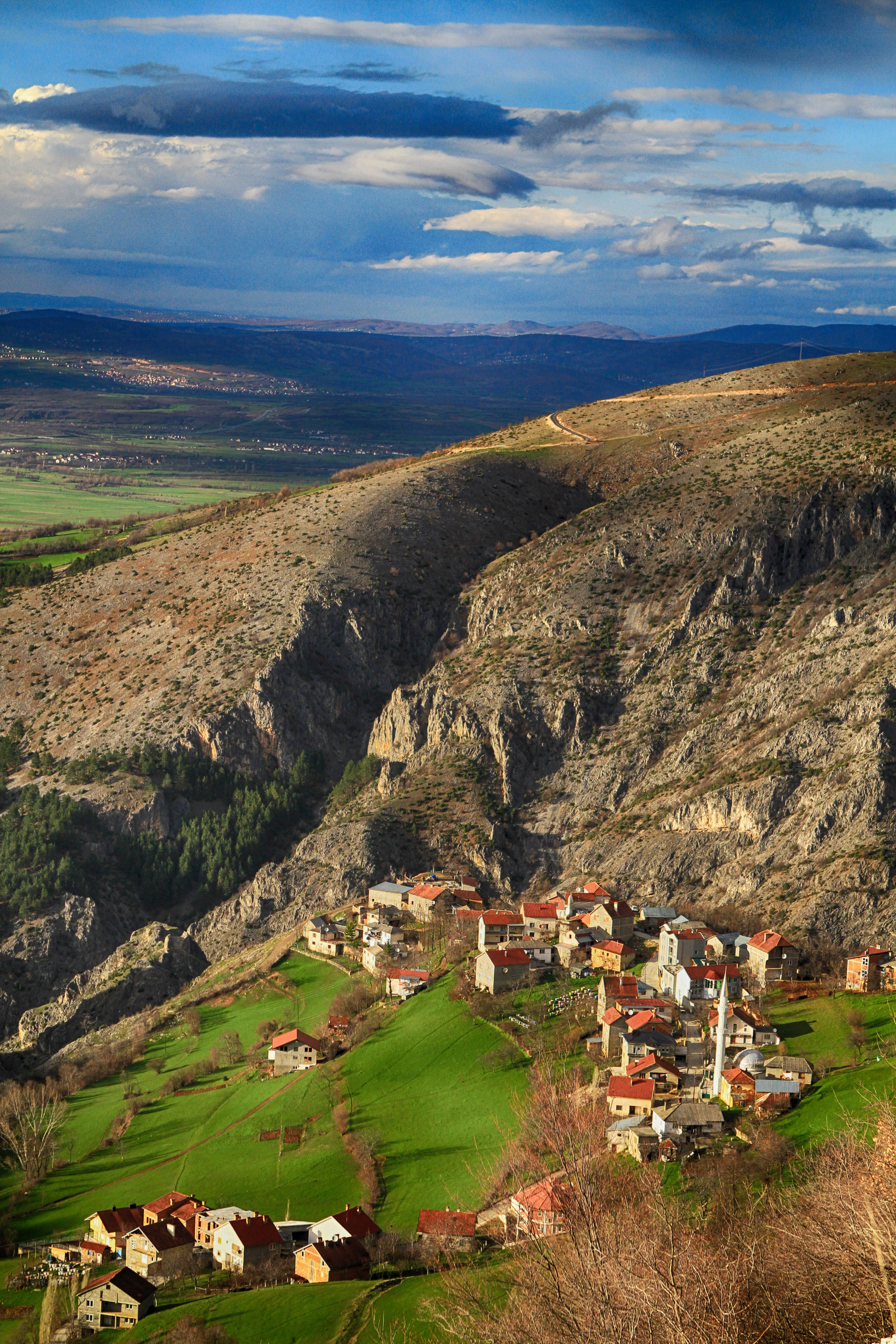

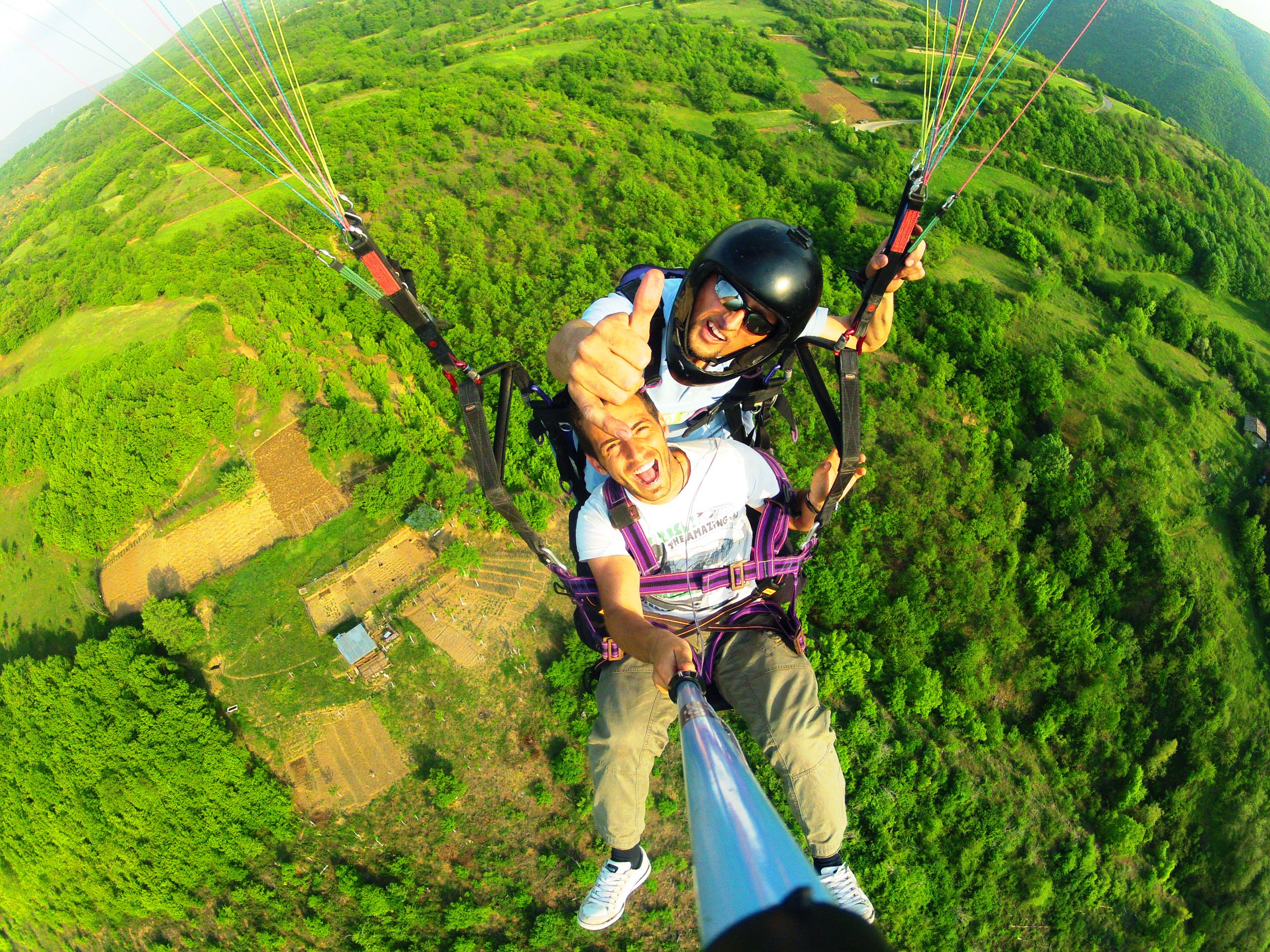

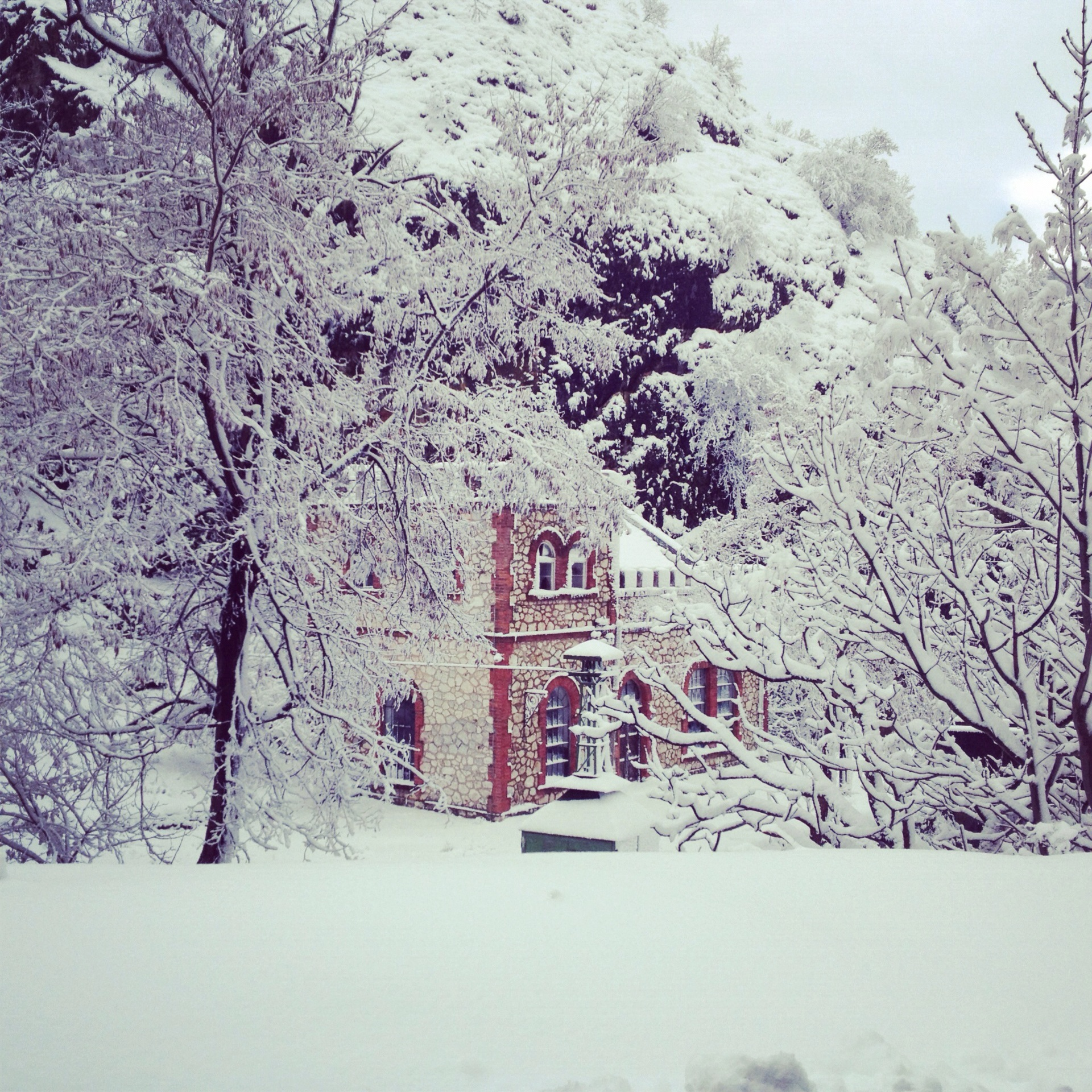

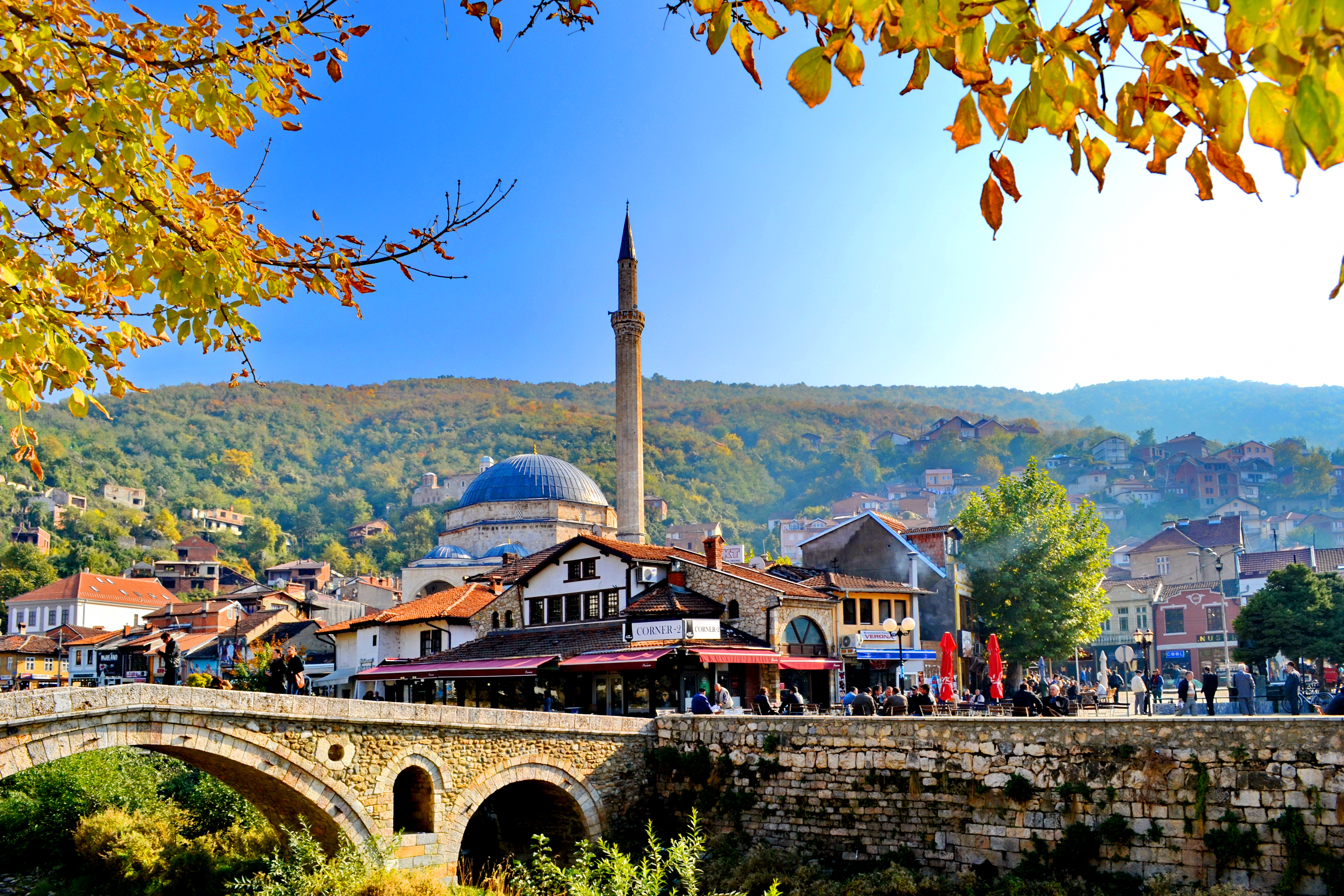

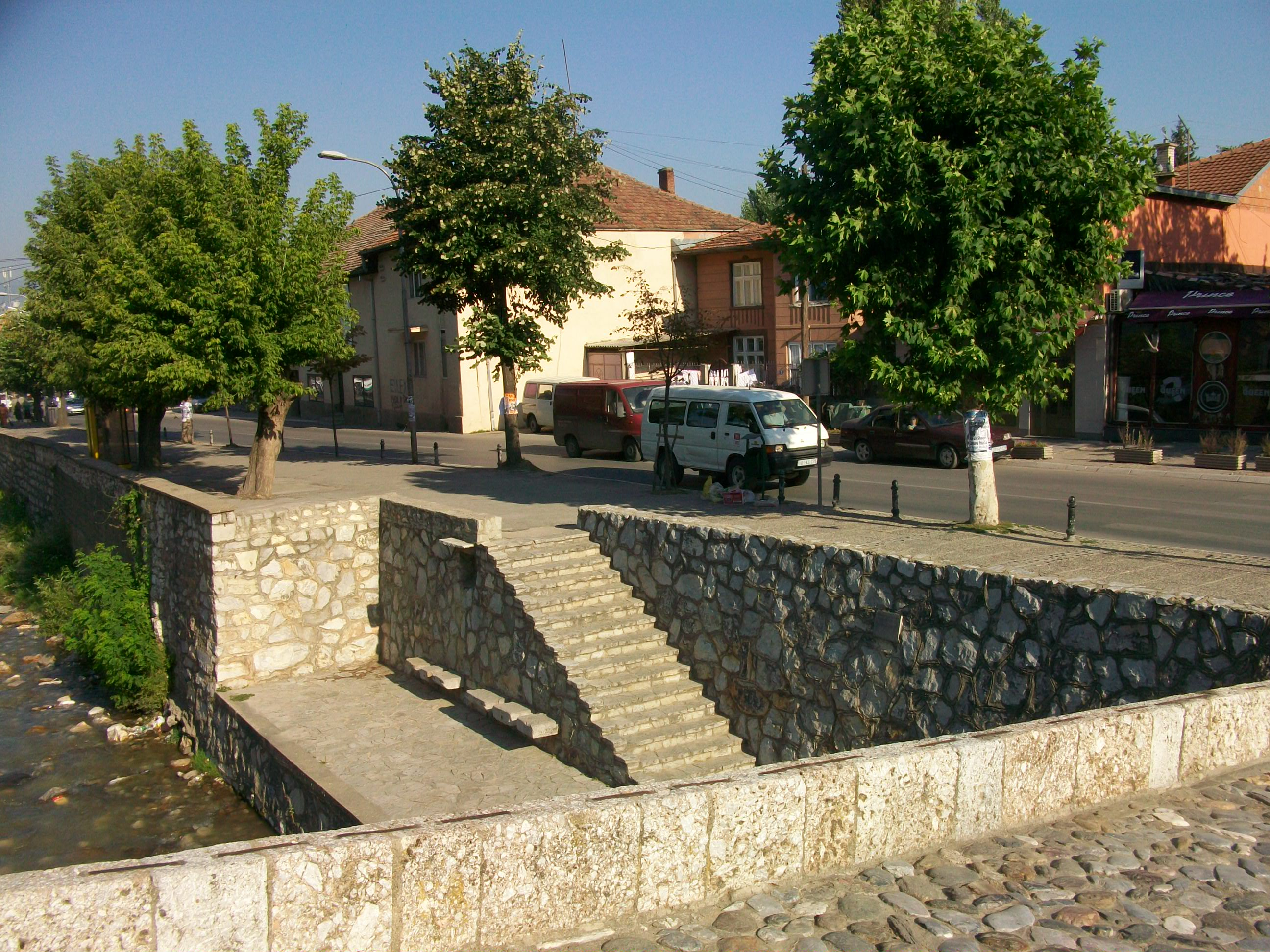

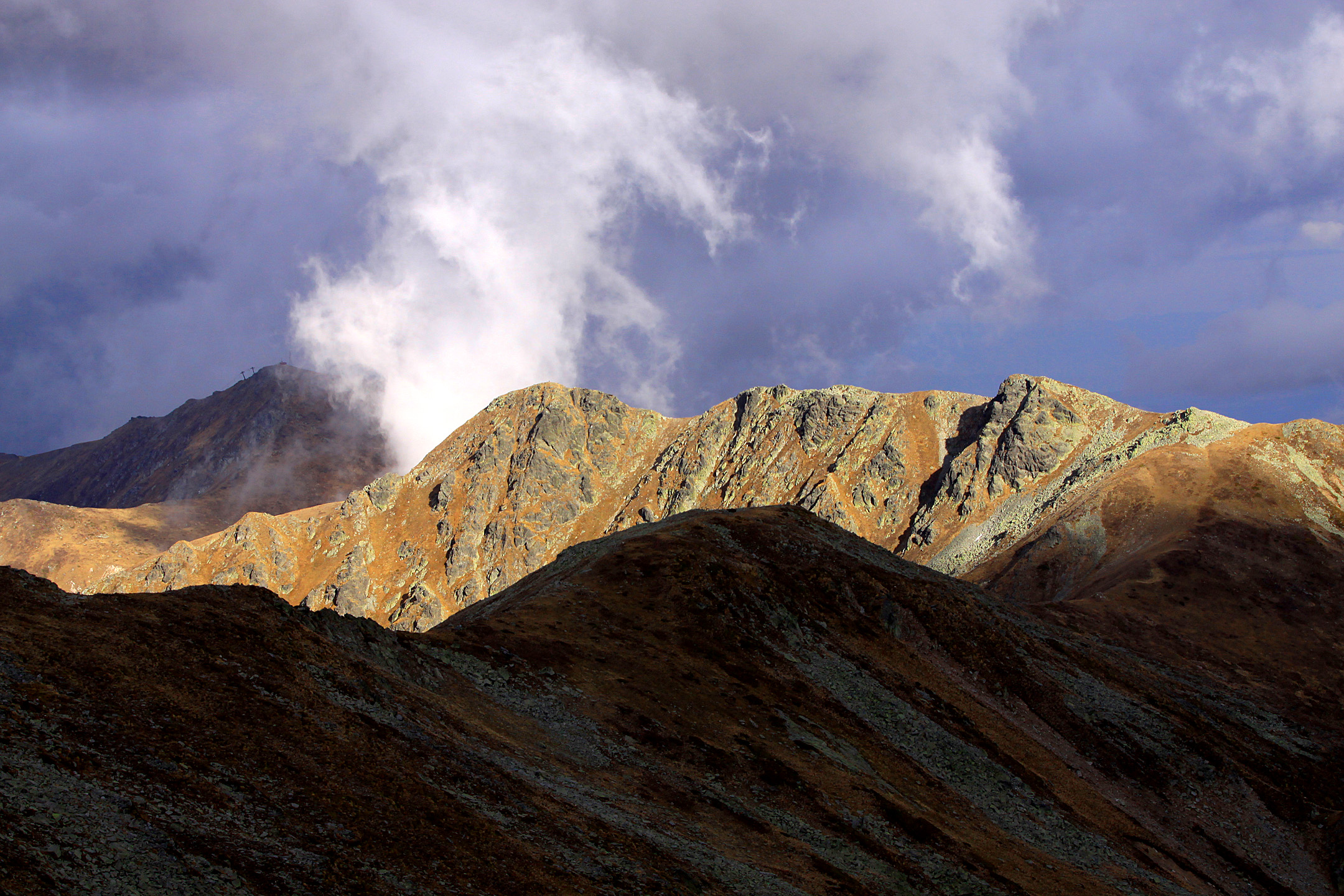

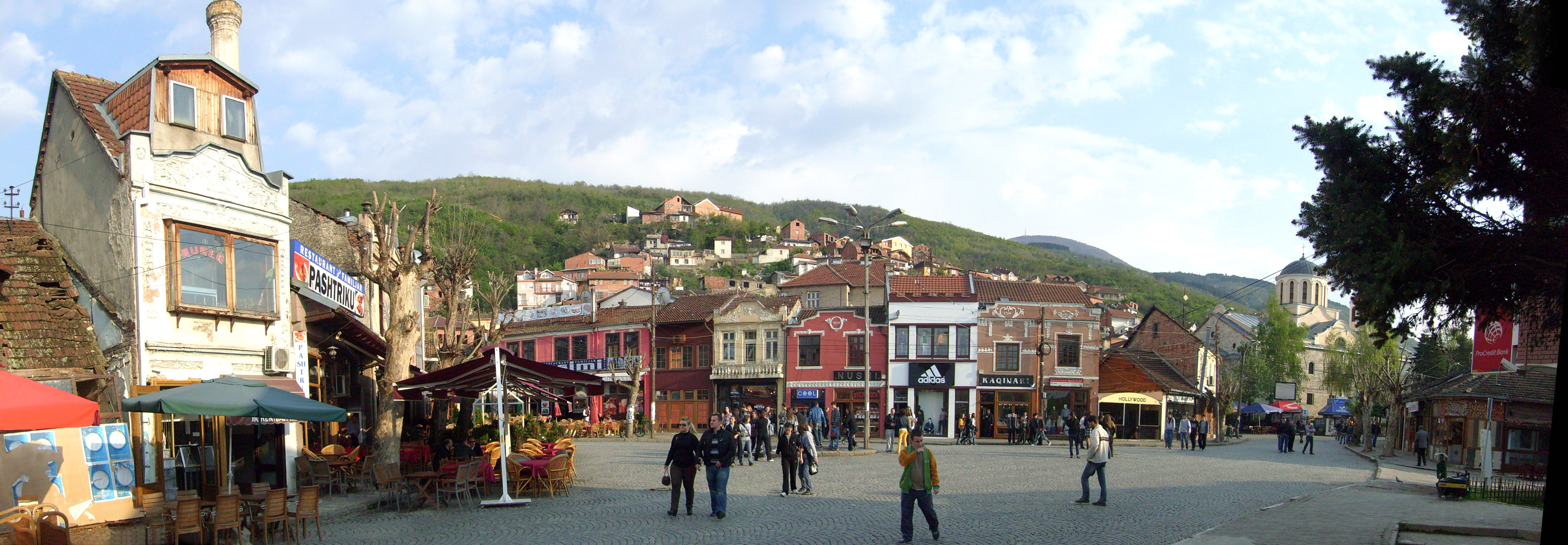

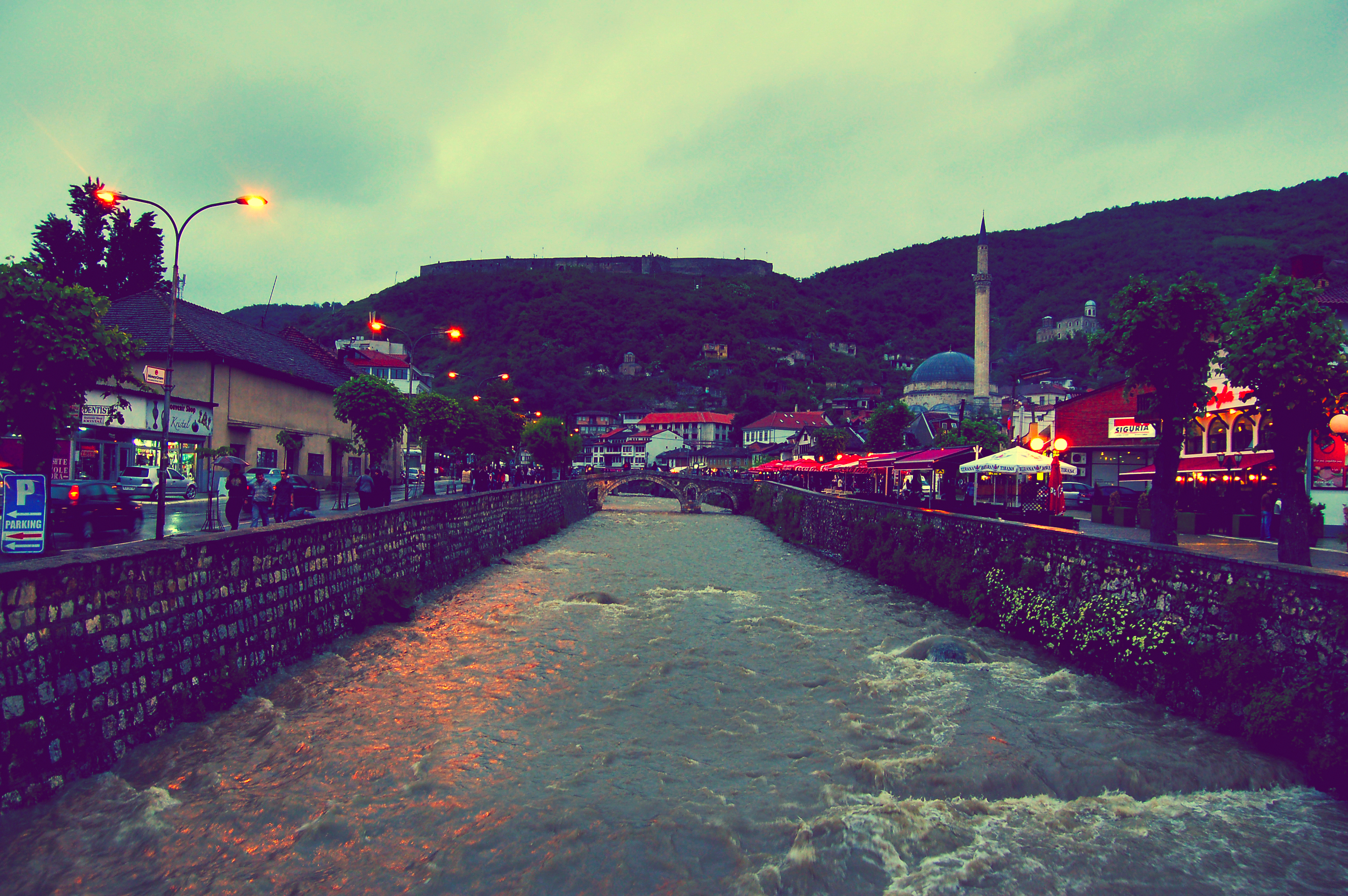

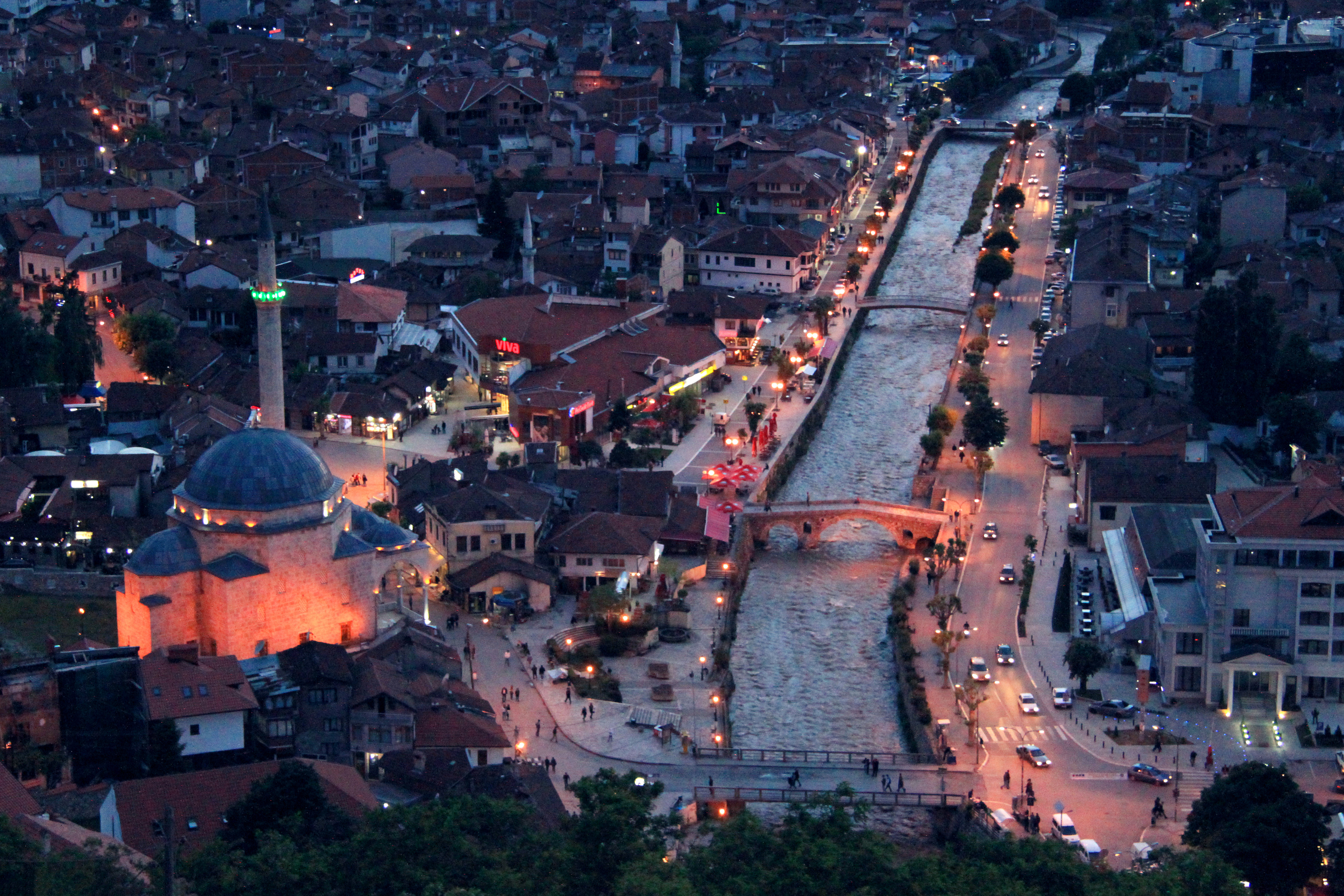

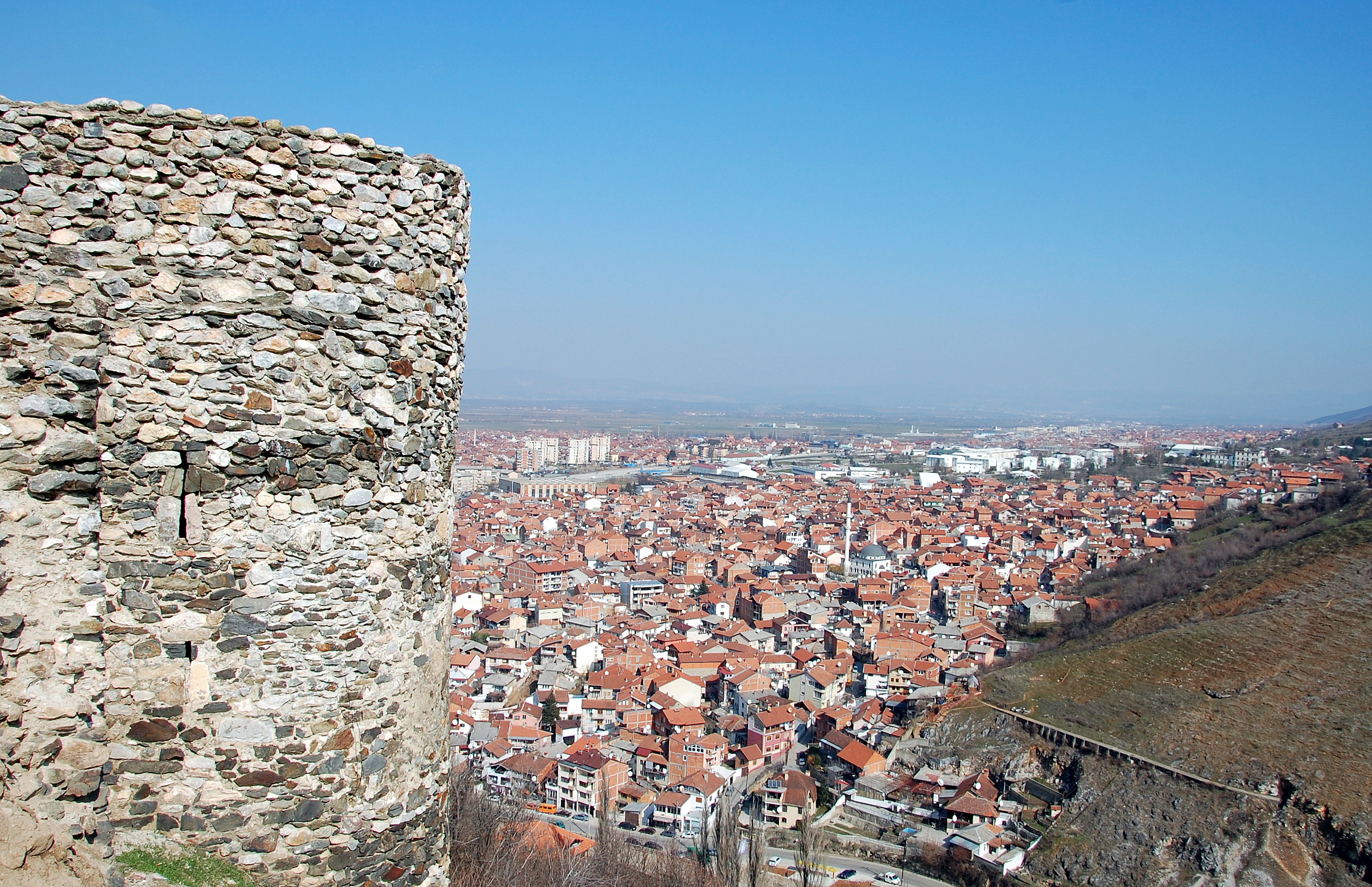

== See also ==
- Geography of Kosovo
