= Loyola Gymnasium Prizren =

Location
- Prizren, District of Prizren; Kosovo
- Coordinates: 42°14′58″N 20°44′9″E

Information
- Type: Private gymnasium boarding school
- Religious affiliation: Catholic
- Denomination: Jesuit
- Patron saint: Ignatius Loyola
- Established: 2005; 21 years ago
- Grades: 6-12
- Gender: Co-educational
- Website: alg-prizren.com

Loyola Gymnasium Prizren is a private school gymnasium boarding school, located in the city of Prizren, in the District of Prizren, Kosovo.

The school was opened by German Jesuits in 2005, in the wake of the civil wars in the area. The school accepts equal numbers of girls and boys, from grade 6 through gymnasium. German is studied as a foreign language in preparation for the "German language Diploma of the Ministerial Conference of Education and Culture of Germany" (DSD).

== See also ==
- Catholic Church in Kosovo
- Education in Kosovo
- List of Jesuit schools
