= List of schools in Bogotá =

This is a list of schools in the city of Bogotá, Colombia:

- Anglo Colombian School (Colegio Anglo-Colombiano)
- Aspaen Gimnasio Iragua
- Centro Cultural y Educativo Reyes Católicos
- Colegio Agustiniano Norte
- Colegio Gimnasio del Norte
- Colegio Helvetia
- Colegio Helvetica de Bogotá
- Colegio Italiano Leonardo da Vinci
- Colegio Jordán de Sajonia
- Colegio Los Nogales
- Colegio Mayor de San Bartolomé
- Colegio Militar Caldas
- Colegio Nueva Granada
- Colegio Salesiano de Leon XIII
- Colegio San Bartolomé La Merced
- Colegio San Carlos
- Deutsche Schule Bogotá
- The English School (Colegio de Inglaterra)
- Gimnasio Alessandro Volta
- Gimnasio Campestre
- Gimnasio de los Cerros
- Gimnasio Moderno
- Knightsbridge Schools International Bogotá
- Lycée Français Louis Pasteur

== See also ==
- List of schools in Colombia
