= Jaime Bermúdez =

Colombian lawyer, diplomat and politician (born c.1966)

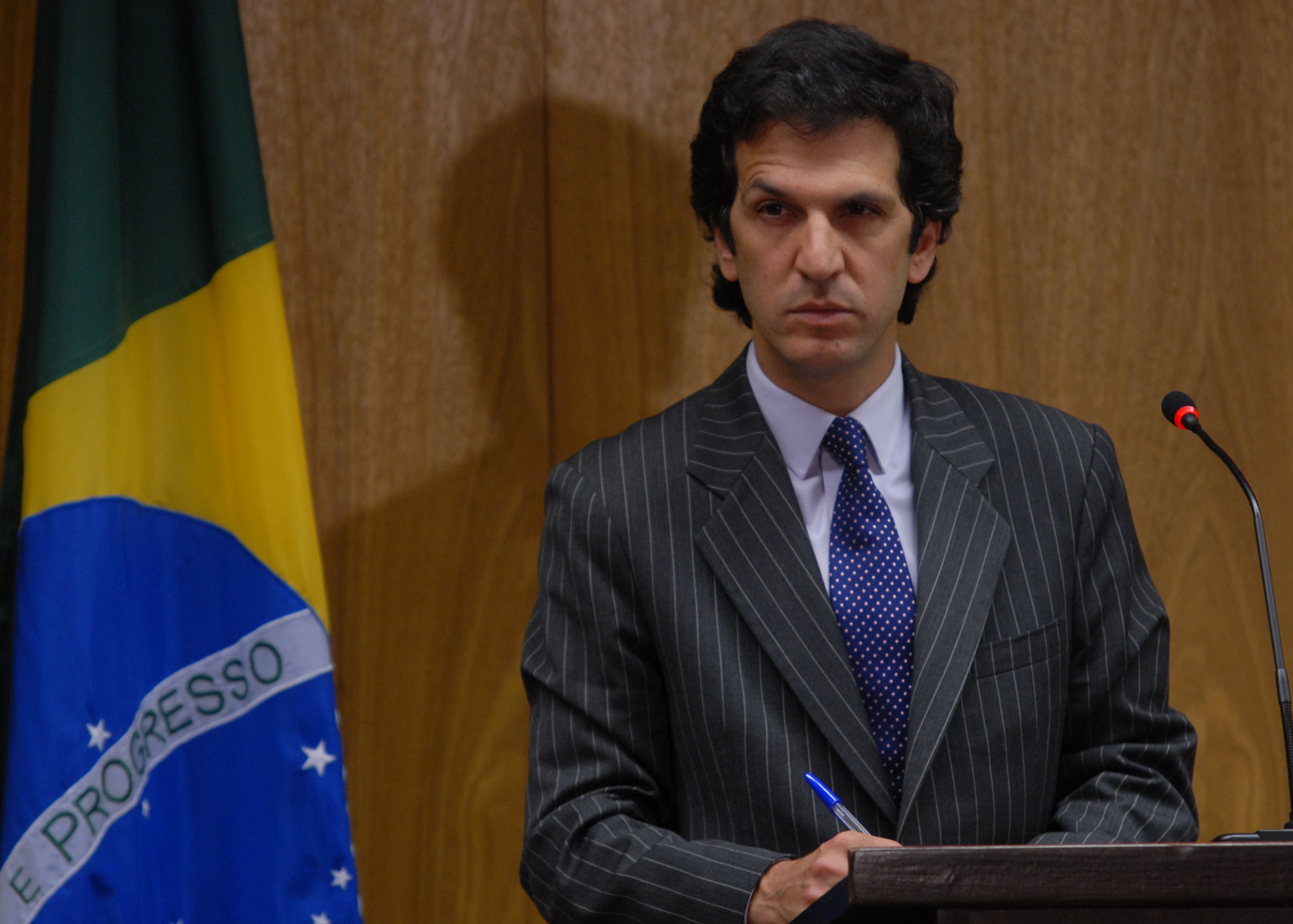

Minister of Foreign Affairs
- In office 18 July 2008 – 7 August 2010
- President: Álvaro Uribe
- Preceded by: Fernando Araújo
- Succeeded by: María Ángela Holguín

Colombia Ambassador to Argentina
- In office 26 August 2006 – 9 July 2008
- President: Álvaro Uribe
- Preceded by: Rodrigo Holguín Lourido
- Succeeded by: Álvaro García Jiménez

Personal details
- Born: Jaime Bermúdez Merizalde; 1966 (age 59–60) Bogotá, D.C., Colombia
- Spouse: Catalina Sanint
- Education: University of the Andes (LLB, 1992); St Antony's College, Oxford (PhD, 2006)
- Profession: Lawyer

Jaime Bermúdez Merizalde (born c. 1966) is a Colombian lawyer and diplomat who served as Minister of Foreign Affairs of Colombia from 2008 to 2010.

== Career ==
Jaime Bermúdez graduated from Gimnasio de los Cerros in 1983. He attended University of the Andes and graduated in Law in 1992. He later obtained a Chevening Scholarship to study for a DPhil degree from St Antony's College, Oxford.

Between 1991 and 1993, Jaime Bermúdez was adviser to the Colombian government's Consejería de Derechos Humanos (Human Rights Committee) and the Minister of Foreign Affairs. Between 1993 and 1994, he was coordinator of the "Good Neighbors Commission". In 1994, he was a UN-appointed observer of the presidential elections in South Africa. In 1996, was executive director of the Consorcio Iberoamericano de Investigaciones de Mercado, CIMA.

Between 2002 and 2006, Bermúdez was a communications adviser to President Álvaro Uribe whom he met around 1998 while they were both students at Oxford University. He was then named as Colombian ambassador to Argentina, a position that he held from August 26, 2006 to July 9, 2008.

== Publications ==
As a member of the "Good Neighbors Commission", Bermúdez edited the book Colombia–Venezuela, un nuevo esquema bilateral (Colombia–Venezuela, A New Bilateral Framework). Together with Cynthia Arnson, he collaborated on the report "Los procesos de paz en Colombia: Múltiples negociaciones, múltiples actores" ("The Peace Process in Colombia: Multiple Negotiations, Multiple Actors").

Bermúdez has been a contributor to the Colombian publications Estrategia y Economía and Revista Diners.
