= Education in Cesar Department =

The Education in Cesar Department as well as the education in Colombia is regulated by the Ministry of National Education, and managed by the Secretary of Education of the Department of Cesar. The education in the Department of Cesar is divided into Transition (Elementary School) which has Pre Kinder and Kinder grade -4 to 6 year olds-; Primary School (Educacion basica primaria) -7 to 11 year olds-; Secondary School -12 to 15 year olds) and Middle School which (secondary and middle school being equivalent to High School and also called Bachillerato). Higher educational institutions, universities and colleges are divided into private and state owned. The Popular University of Cesar (UPC) is the state owned university of the Department of Cesar.

== Main high schools by municipality ==
=== Aguachica ===
- Instituto Jose Maria Campo Serrano
- Colegio Teresiano Reina del Carmelo
- Colegio Liceo del Sur
- Institucion Educativa Guillermo Leon Valencia

=== Agustin Codazzi ===
- Colegio Cooperativo del Buen Pastor
- Institucion Educativa Gabriel Garcia Marquez

=== Astrea ===
- Colegio Nacionalizado de Bachillerato Alvaro Araujo Noguera
- Instituto Cristiano Pentecostal

=== Bosconia ===
- Colegio Eloy Quintero Araujo

=== Chiriguana ===
- Instituto Tecnico Juan Mejia Gomez

=== Curumani ===
- Colegio Camilo Torres Restrepo

=== El Copey ===
- Instituto Agricola

=== Gamarra ===
- Colegio Nacionalizado Rafael Salazar Noche

=== La Gloria ===
- Instituto Tecnico Integrado La Gloria
- Unidad Educativa Ayacucho

=== Manaure ===
- Concentracion del Desarrollo Rural

=== Pailitas ===
- Instituto Agricola Rosa Jaimes Barrera

=== Pelaya ===
- Colegio Integrado de Pelaya
- Institucion Educativa Francisco Rinaldy Morato

=== San Alberto ===
- Institucion Educativa San Alberto Magno

=== Tamalameque ===
- Colegio de Bachillerato Anibal Martinez Zuleta

(Colegio de Bachillerato Instituto Técnico Agropecuario

=== Valledupar ===
- Colegio Hispanoamericano
- Colegio Nacional Loperena
- Colegio Parroquial El Carmelo
- Colegio Santa Fe
- Fundacion Colegio Bilingue de Valledupar (FCBV)
- Colegio Gimnasio del Norte
- Colegio Ateneo El Rosario
- Colegio de la Sagrada Familia
- Colegio Fundacion Manuela Beltran
- Colegio Maria Montessori
- Colegio Pablo Sexto morning
- Colegio Gimnasio del Saber
- Asociacion Educativa del Cesar (ASEDEC)
- Centro Educativo Comunal Francisco de Paula Santander
- Colegio Anexo a la Universidad Popular del Cesar
- Colegio Manuel German Cuello
- Colegio Municipal Francisco Molina Sanchez
- Colegio Nacional Loperena - Garupal
- Colegio San Antonio
- Institucion Educativa Alfonso Araujo Cotes
- Institucion Educativa Antonio Enrique Diaz Martinez
- Institucion Educativa Bello Horizonte
- Institucion Educativa Tecnico Upar
- Instituto Dagoberto Alvarez Rojas
- Instituto Marco Fidel Suarez
- Instituto Nocturno Rafael Nunez
- Instituto Osvaldo Vergara Fernandez
- Instituto Tecnico Comercial Jose Eugenio Martinez
- Liceo La Nevada

== See also ==
- Education in Colombia
