= Roger Goodman =

Roger Goodman may refer to:

- Roger Goodman (politician), American politician
- Roger Goodman (director), TV director
- Roger Goodman (academic), warden of St Antony's College, Oxford
