= Colégio Militar (disambiguation) =

Colégio Militar is a military secondary school in Lisbon, Portugal.

Colégio militar in Portuguese or Colegio militar in Spanish ('military college') may also refer to:

== Military schools and academies ==
- Colegio Militar Caldas, a military secondary school in Bogotá, Colombia
- Colegio Militar de la Nación, in El Palomar, Buenos Aires, Argentina
- Heroico Colegio Militar, in Popotla, Mexico City, Mexico
- Colegio Militar Leoncio Prado, Lima, Peru,

== Transportation ==
- Colégio Militar/Luz (Lisbon Metro), a station of the Lisbon metro in Portugal
- Colegio Militar metro station, a station of the Mexico City metro system

== See also ==
- Heroic Military Academy (Mexico)
