= Antonin Besse =

French businessman (1877–1951)

Sir Antonin Besse
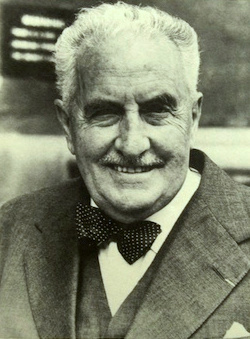
- Born: Antonin Besse; June 26, 1877; Carcassonne, France
- Died: July 2, 1951 (aged 74); Elgin, Moray, Scotland
- Occupations: Businessman, Merchant, Philanthropist
- Known for: Founder of the trading company A. Besse & Co. (Aden) Ltd;
- Children: 6

Antonin Besse (26 June 1877 – 2 July 1951) was a French-born businessman based in Aden, Yemen, where he spent most of his adult life. St Antony's College, Oxford was established in 1950 as a result of a large donation he made to the university.

== Early life ==
Antonin Besse was born in June 1877 in Carcassonne, France. After his father died, Antonin, then 7, moved to Montpelier with the rest of his family including six brothers. He was not academically inclined and this might have prompted him to enlist in the army when he was 18, where he stayed until he was 22.

== Early career ==
Besse then started looking for work and signed a three-year contract to work as a clerk for Bardey et Cie (Bardey & Co.), an Aden-based French trading house that exported coffee from Yemen. Being penniless, he borrowed money from his brother-in-law to buy tropical clothing as well as his passage to Aden. He left Marseille on a steamer bound for Aden in April 1899.

Besse worked very hard at Bardey & Co., often waking up at 4.30 in the morning and working non-stop until 6 in the evening, learning everything to be learned about the Yemeni coffee trade.

== Own business ==
In 1902 and after the end of his contract with Bardey & Co., he moved to the city of Hodeida and founded his own trade with capital borrowed from his brother-in-law. Later that year he closed down that business and went back to France. In France, negotiations were successful to obtain a large loan from a bank, that enabled him to establish his work in Aden and pay all his debts. He brought with him his brother Emile to Aden to help manage the work founded in Hodeidah. By 1904, Besse found himself struggling to pay the financial dues to the bank. His brother-in-law – with the assistance of a lawyer – managed to settle his debts with the bank and to pay reduced premiums, but before maturity.

== Business activities in Aden ==
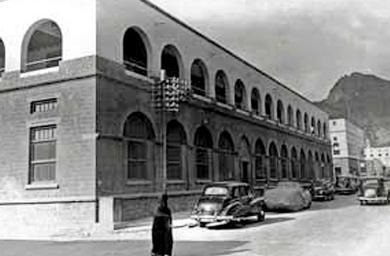
Headquarters of A. Besse & Co., Aden

Besse built the headquarters of his company in Aidrus Road, Crater, the building continued to be the centre of operations until his death in 1951. The ground floor of the building consisted of warehouses and stores, the second floor consisted of offices, staff rooms and rest rooms, and on the third floor a luxury apartment acted as his residence. Later, he built a distinctive and unique villa on top of Ras Marshag, Crater. The villa became a private residence of the leader who rules Yemen.

The year 1934 saw the launch of diversified projects, a soap factory in Crater, but he had transferred the factory in following year to Mualla, where he upgraded the factory machines further. In 1937 another factory was built next to the soap factory for the production of coconut oil and a third plant for the production of glycerin. He was also active in shipbuilding and he was the first in Aden to install a diesel engine on local sailing ships (Dhows) in 1936.

When Besse traveled to Mukalla on a sailing ship, the journey was slow and uncomfortable, prompting him to establish in 1936 an airline company with a capital of five thousand pounds, dubbed Arabian Airways, the fleet consisted of two small planes, each with a capacity of four seats. His idea was to connect the port city of Aden and Hadhramaut region, but one of the planes crashed after one year of operation and replaced by another, then the second plane crashed at the Tarim airport in 1938, due to losses incurred he decided to close the company the following year in 1939.

His company – A. Besse & Co. (Aden) Ltd – was agent of many insurance, airlines and shipping companies. He also managed to get an agency of the Dutch company Royal Dutch Shell, a business that brought fortune to his trading empire.

== Philanthropy and recognition ==
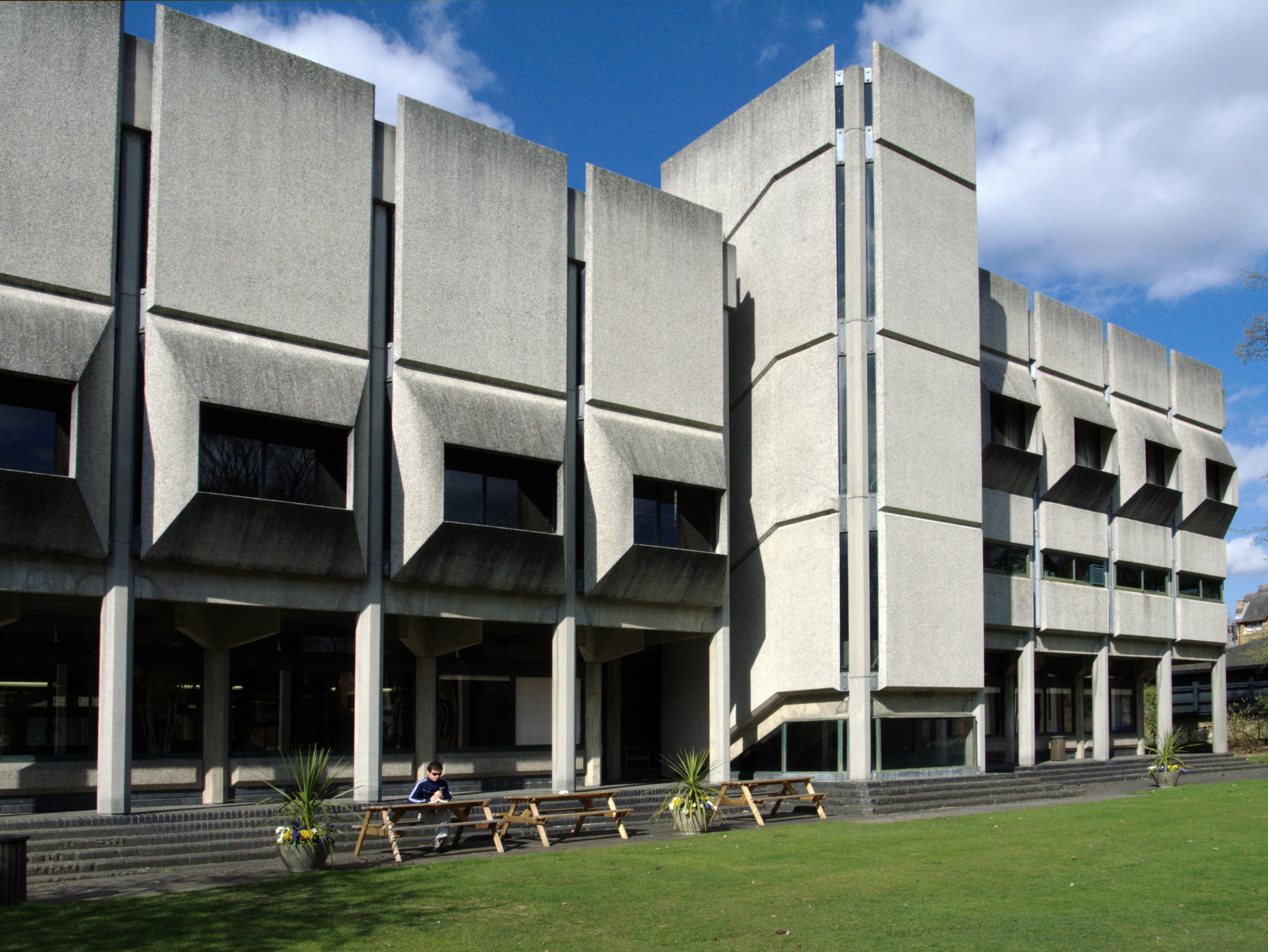
Besse Building, St. Antony's College

Besse founded St Antony's College, Oxford, in 1950, and endowed a number of other Oxford colleges. In 1947, Besse was considering giving around £2 million to the University of Oxford to found a new college. The university was initially unreceptive to the offer, and recommended that Besse instead devote his funds to improving the finances of some of the poorer existing colleges, which he did, contributing a total of £250,000 in varied amounts to several colleges. After this contribution, the university decided to reconsider Besse's offer to help found a new college and, recognising the need to provide for the growing number of postgraduate students coming to Oxford, gave the venture their blessing; and in 1948, Besse signed a deed of trust appointing the college's first trustees. The college first admitted students in Michaelmas Term 1950 and received its royal charter in 1953. A supplementary charter was granted in 1962 to allow the college to admit women as well as men, and in 1963 the college became a full member of the University of Oxford.

He also made gifts to the British Museum, and was later knighted by the British government with dispensation from Charles de Gaulle.

== Personal life ==
When he returned to France early in 1907 he met Marguerite Godefroid by chance on a train. They continued to correspond for a year, then married in April 1908. Marguerite belonged to a wealthy aristocratic family and brought much luck to Antonin. Their first child, Meryem Rose-Aye Fernande was born on 11 January 1909 in Brussels. André, their eldest son was born in June two years later in 1911. Marguerite invested heavily in his business and became a partner. The sales of coffee increased seven times in the first year of operation, and after the outbreak of World War I it reached two thousand times.

His marriage to Marguerite ended in divorce. In 1922, Florence Hilda Crowther became his second wife and soulmate until his death. She gave birth to two sons, Peter and Antonin, and three daughters, Ariane, Joy and Monna. The younger son (Antonin) took over the business after his father's death in 1951, and later became a patron and honorary vice-president of the United World Colleges.

== Death ==
Sir Antonin Besse suffered a stroke in the summer of 1948 and, three years later, died in Elgin, Moray, Scotland, on 2 July 1951, aged 74. By then he had entrusted to his son Antonin Besse II the management of his expansive trading empire. He developed his father's business intelligently until the independence of South Yemen in 1967 and the enforcement of the Nationalization Act.
