= St Antony's International Review =

- Discipline: International relations
- Language: English

Publication details
- History: 2005–present
- Frequency: Biannual

Standard abbreviations
- ISO 4: St Antony's Int. Rev.

Indexing
- ISSN: 1746-451X
- OCLC no.: 59719965

Links
- Journal homepage; Online archive

St Antony's International Review (STAIR) is the peer-reviewed student-run journal of international affairs of the University of Oxford, founded in 2005 by graduate students of St Antony's College. The journal covers the fields of international relations, political science, area studies, development studies, international history and other social sciences.

Notable past contributors include Robert O. Keohane, James N. Rosenau, Alfred Stepan, and Chester Crocker. In addition to senior academics, the journal also features submissions by graduate and doctoral students.

The members of the advisory board are Roy Allison, Alexander Betts, Christopher Bickerton, Patricia Daley, Matthew Eagleton-Pierce, Rosemary Foot, Timothy Garton Ash, Sudhir Hazareesingh, Andrew Hurrell, David Johnson, Margaret MacMillan, Hartmut Mayer, Karma Nabulsi, Kalypso Nicolaïdis, Noa Schonmann, Duncan Snidal, and Steve Tsang.

STAIR is co-affiliated with, and funded with the support of, St Antony's College and the Department of Politics and International Relations at the University of Oxford, and supported by the Graduate Common Room of St Antony's College.
