= Colegio Helvetica de Bogotá =

Swiss international school in Bogotá, Colombia

Coordinates: 4.71480°N 74.07622°W

Colegio Helvetica de Bogotá (CHB; German: Schweizerschule Bogotá) is a Swiss international school in Bogotá, Colombia. It serves up to grade 12 (final year of Sekundarstufe II).

It was founded in 1949. As of 2016 it has 780 students.
