= Centro Cultural y Educativo Reyes Católicos =

Spanish international school

The Centro Cultural Educativo Español Reyes Católicos or the Colegio Español Reyes Católicos is a Spanish international school in Bogotá, Colombia, operated by the Spanish Ministry of Education. It is between carrera 11B and calle 127A in northern Bogota. It serves nursery (ages 3–5) through bachillerato (senior high school/sixth form college).

== History ==
The establishment of the center began in 1980 and it was formally established by Decree No. 604 of February 25, 1982. The center itself was created in the 1950s as a joint project of the governments of Spain and Colombia, but the formal establishment and management by degree originated in the 1980s.

It is in the north of Bogota at calle 127A and carrera 11B. It has 817 students, with 464 in preschool and primary school and 353 in secondary school, along with 53 teachers with a majority being Spanish.

The school is governed under the general direction of international cooperation of the Spanish education ministry as well as the Proyecto Educativo Institucional (P.E.I.). The L.O.E. will be implementing a new framework that will be adopted by the school.

The curriculum used is that of Spain for all levels, although social sciences of Colombia are also taught. Students graduate with both Spanish and Colombian baccalaureates.

The cultural center also has exhibitions, performances, concerts, cycles, and other activities.

== Student body ==
As of 2015 the school has 817 students and 53 teachers; the majority of the teachers are Spanish. Of the students, 464 are in nursery through primary school and 353 are in secondary school.
