= Roger Goodman (anthropologist) =

British social scientist and academic (born 1960)

Roger Goodman CBE
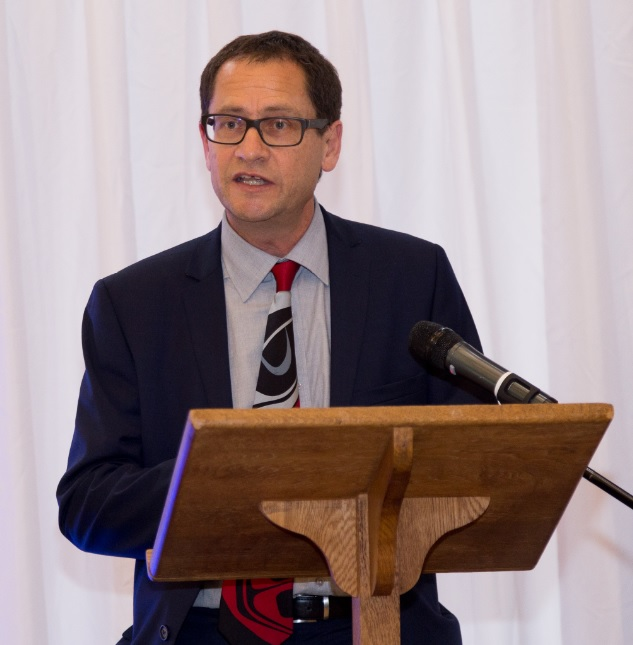
- Roger Goodman speaking at St Antony's College
- Born: Roger Goodman; 26 May 1960 (age 66)
- Education: Durham University (BA); Oxford University (DPhil)
- Occupations: Academic, social scientist
- Notable work: Japan's International Youth (1990); Children of the Japanese State (2000)

Roger James Goodman CBE (born 26 May 1960) is a British social scientist and academic, specialising in Japanese studies. He is the Nissan Professor of Modern Japanese Studies at the Nissan Institute for Japanese Studies at the University of Oxford, and the sixth Warden of St Antony's College, Oxford.

Goodman became president of the Academy of Social Sciences in January 2020. He was also head of the Social Sciences Division of Oxford from 2008 to 2017.

== Early life and education ==
Goodman was born on 26 May 1960 to Cyril Joshua Goodman and Ruth Goodman (née Sabel). He was educated at Rugby School, a then all-boys private boarding school, and at King Edward VI Grammar School, Chelmsford, then an all-boys state grammar school. He studied at Durham University, graduating with a Bachelor of Arts (BA) degree in 1981. In 1982, he matriculated into St Antony's College, Oxford, to undertake postgraduate studies in social anthropology. He completed his Doctor of Philosophy (DPhil) degree in 1987 with a thesis titled "A study of the Kikokushijo phenomenon: returnee schoolchildren in contemporary Japan".

== Academic career ==
In August 2016, Goodman was announced as the next Warden of St Antony's College, Oxford. He became sixth Warden in October 2017 in succession to the retiring Margaret MacMillan.

Goodman was appointed Commander of the Order of the British Empire (CBE) in the 2024 New Year Honours for services to social science.

== Selected works ==
- Goodman, Roger (1990). Japan's "international youth": the emergence of a new class of schoolchildren. Oxford: Clarendon Press. ISBN 978-0198278412.
- Goodman, Roger (2000). Children of the Japanese state: the changing role of child protection institutions in contemporary Japan. Oxford: Oxford University Press. ISBN 978-0198234210.

Academic offices
Preceded by Margaret MacMillan	Warden of St Antony's College, Oxford; 2017 to present	Incumbent
