= Colegio Gimnasio del Norte =

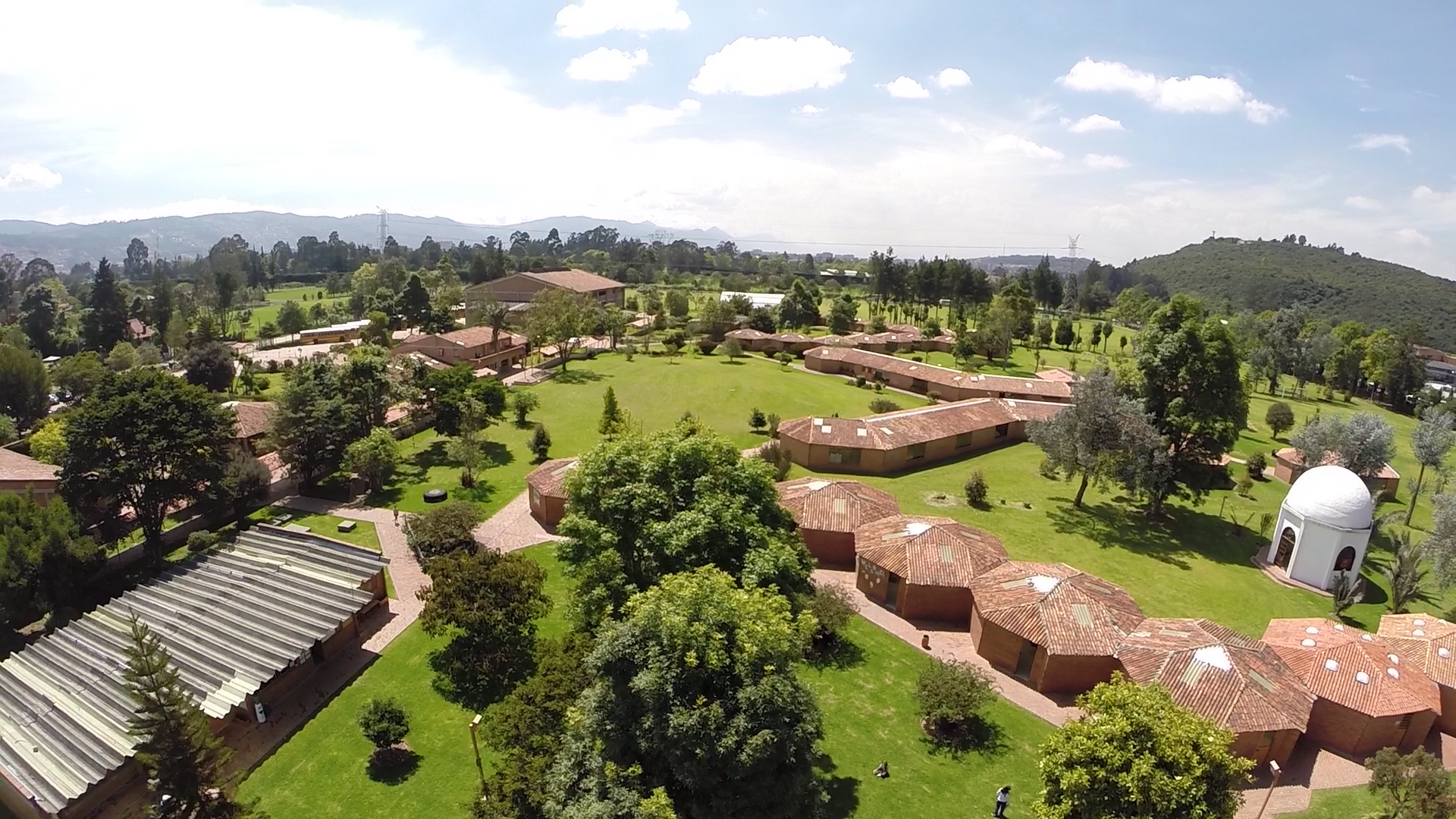

Information
- Established: 1977; 49 years ago
- Website: www.gimnasiodelnorte.edu.co

Colegio Gimnasio del Norte is a school in Bogotá, Colombia. It was founded in 1977, thanks to the initiative of a group of people headed by its present Director, Doctor Ricardo Pérez Arciniegas.

It initiated work with 47 high school and 17 elementary school students. It obtained official approval of all the courses, with very high scores, in 1978, the year in which the first group of high schoolers graduated. The general development of the school continued in harmony, with the decisive support of the parents, teachers, workers and students. A good part of the first campus was built with the active participation of all of the above.

Participatory learning programs within the institution’s curricula focus on the development of students in both academic and non-academic areas.

Gimnasio del Norte has been granting high school diplomas since 1978 and has established relationships with educational centers in different countries, which part of the International Baccalaureate Organization (IBO) since 1992.

In the second semester of 2018, Carlos Alberto Casas replaced Jose Contreras as school principal.
