= Colegio Militar Caldas =

Private military school in Bogotá, Colombia

Caldas Military Academy
- Spanish: Colegio Militar Caldas

Information
- Established: 1960; 65 years ago

Caldas Military Academy (Spanish: Colegio Militar Caldas) is a private military school in Bogotá, Colombia.

The school was founded in 1960 by the Cooperative of Retired Soldiers under the name Colegio Militar Cooperativo. It was first located on the site of the "Ramírez Military Academy".

exactly the "Francisco Miranda: neighborhood, 106th Street and 9th Avenue, near to the Canton Norte.

== Overview ==
The academy was originally located in Usaquen, It later moved to Tenjo, Cundinamarca.

The academy was originally directed by Colonel Camilo Acevedo Velez and Mayor Pinillos, and was part of the military system of the Colombian Armed Forces. From 1960 to 1970, the students used the same military uniform as the armed forces, but then the government ordered military academies to have a different uniform. The military training was also reduced to basic military service. From 1960 to 1989, the academy was part of the Infantry armed forces, then part of the Cavalry forces. In the early 1990s, female students were accepted.

The academy offers elementary and secondary schooling . The students also get military training and they receive the title of sub-official of the reserve army.

The buildings were 6 x 6 city blocks that included a soccer field and parade camp, volleyball and basketball fields, main building and class rooms for the students: One with 5 floors was a dormitory for the permanent students.

== Alumni ==
One of the former students, Roberto Convers, became the Vice-Principal. Other alumni include Rafael Cely Vega and his brother Luis Cely Vega of the Colombian Police and the GAULA division of the Colombian Army. Only one student: Brigadier Cely Vega (Rafael) become an effective lieutenant of the armed forces.

The alumni participate in parades and events such as the 20th of July Independence Parade. They were the Honour Guard for Pope Paul VI's visit to Colombia in 1969.
