= Gimnasio de los Cerros =

Gimnasio de Los Cerros

Location
- Calle 119 # 4 -48. Bogotá; Colombia
- Coordinates: 4.693832°N 74.026776°W

Information
- Type: Private
- Established: 1964
- Principal: Rafael Castro Sarmiento (Current) Eduardo Manrique (Former)
- Colors: Burgundy, white, blue
- Athletics: Football, volleyball, basketball
- Website: www.loscerros.edu.co

The Gimnasio de Los Cerros is a private religious primary and secondary school associated with the Opus Dei, located in Bogotá, Colombia. Founded in 1964, the school has about 800 students (as of 2009). During the afternoons, the school provides extracurricular activities, such as music, football, basketball and volleyball.
