= Eugenio Cruz Vargas =

Chilean poet and painter (1923–2014)

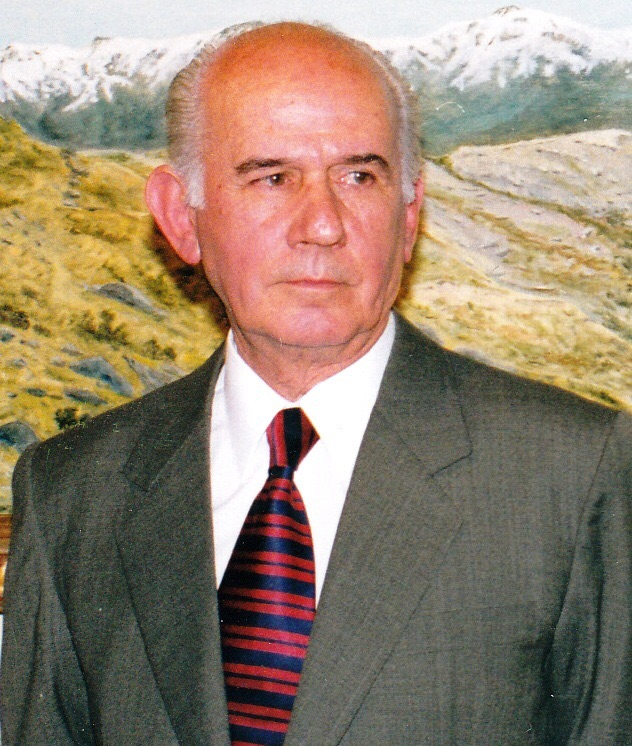
- Born: Eugenio Cruz Vargas; October 2, 1923; Santiago, Chile
- Died: January 18, 2014 (aged 90); Olmue, Chile
- Known for: Painter and poet
- Notable work: Painting: Macizo Almirante Nieto (Torres del Paine), Valparaíso, Landscape Mítico and other. Poetry: The only time I lie, Sky and From the Earthly to the Spatial
- Movement: Naturalism, Romanticism and creationism

Signature
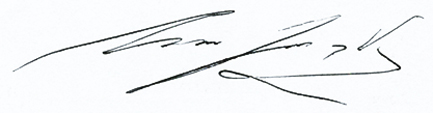

Eugenio Cruz Vargas (Santiago, October 2, 1923 – Olmué, January 18, 2014) was a notable Chilean poet and painter. His art was developed under the naturalistic landscape and abstraction, and his collection of poems under the concepts of surrealism and culminate in the literary creationism.)

== Biography ==
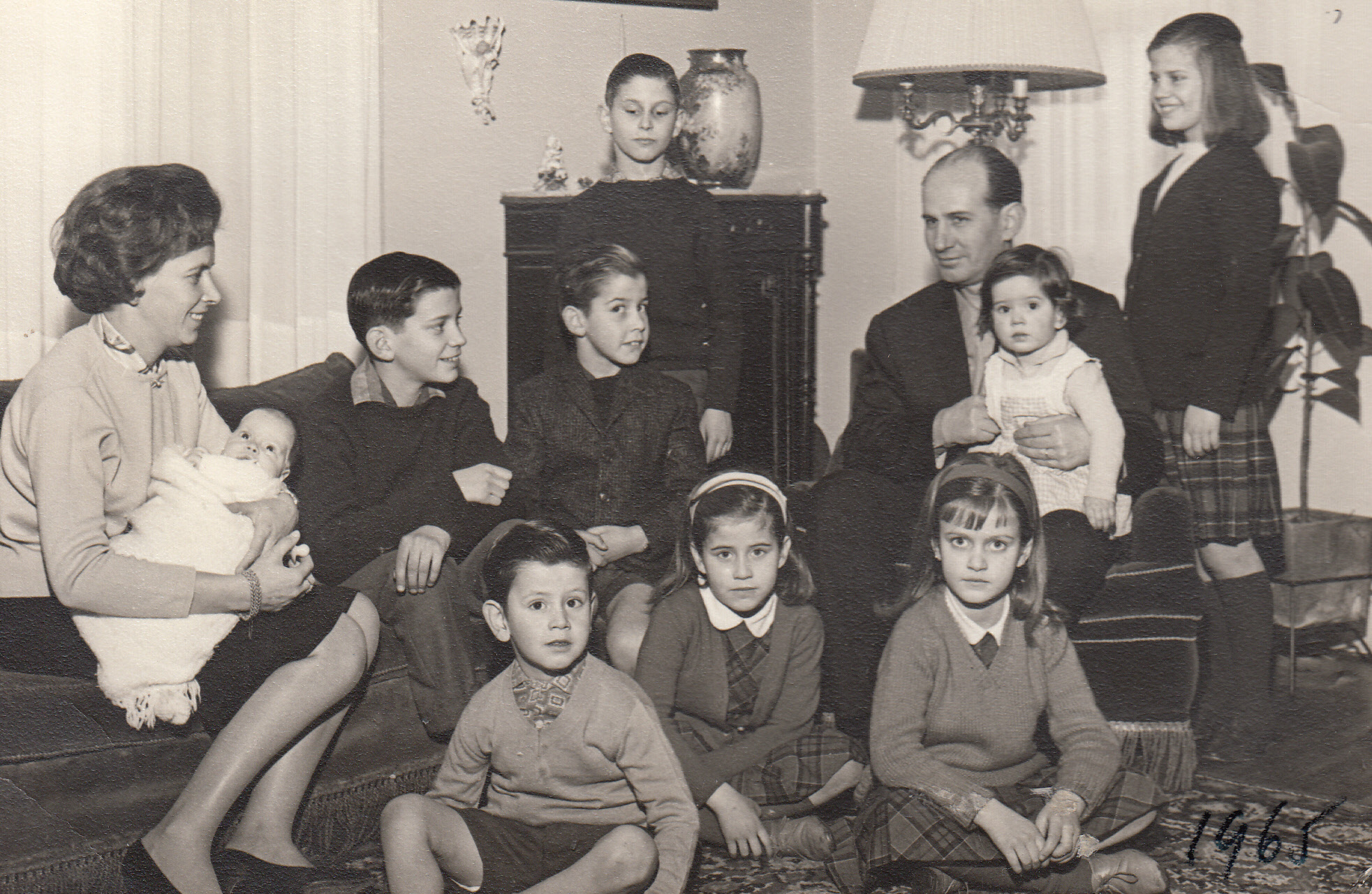
Eugenio Cruz Vargas and family in 1965

His parents were Pedro Nolasco Cruz Correa and Maria Vargas Bello, he was grandson of the literary critic Pedro Nolasco Cruz Vergara, great-grandson of Francisco Vargas Fontecilla and Vicente Correa Albano, and great-great-grandson of Andrés Bello López and Pedro Nolasco Vergara Albano.

He married on July 15, 1950 with Luz Vergara Errazuriz (July 10, 1927 – June 25, 2014), great-granddaughter of Fernando Errázuriz Aldunate and Juan Mackenna O'Reilly. Together they had 9 children; José Eugenio, Soledad, Juan José, Eduardo, Josefina, Isabel, Felipe, María de la Luz and Santiago.

He studied at the Colegio San Ignacio, a jesuit school located in Santiago. Then he worked at Banco de Chile in marketing and property development, particularly in real estate development in communes located in the north-east part of Santiago: Providencia, Vitacura and Las Condes.

In the early sixties, he became a partner in the "Agencia de Publicidad Cóndor" an advertising agency funded in 1942 by Ruperto Vergara Santa Cruz, company that he ended up owning. Later on he stablished the agencies "Cruz y del Solar", and in the following years "Vía Publicidad" y "Publicidad Siete".

On 1970, when the marketing sector faced a crisis in Chile, due to the political, social and economic situation, he travelled to Europa and Asia looking for new projects. During a long stay in Paris, he studied in the École du Louvre, where he attended courses of Art History. Later on he moved to United States with the goal of raising funds for joint Chilean-American film productions, being able to produce two films: The comedy "Antonio", filmed in Quintay fishermans dwarf, Santiago and Pirque, under the direction of the Chilean filmmaker and television producer, Claudio Guzmán and as Larry Hagman and Trini López as actors; and the drama "Autorretrato", directed by Maurice McEndree and starred by the Canadian actor Joby Baker, the U.S. actress Pamela Hensley and the Chilean actresses Alicia Quiroga and María Eugenia Cavieres. The music if this last film is from Ángel Parra and Isabel Parra. There are no remaining copies of this two films in the Chile, and no information of the first, and very little from the second in the catalog of the National Library of Chile.

His love of nature led him to acquire farms in Los Angeles in 1965 and Río Bueno in 1974.

He was the creator of Via Advertising (1974), Libraries for Chile (1987), the Central Station Mall (1978), today Paseo Estación Mall, and dozens of other initiatives.

== Paintings ==
Originally, its theme of the exhibitions in 1986, 1999 and 1999 it's about Chilean environment peasant. Nature was one of the central issues, approaching, with his paintings, to the classical teachers of naturalism and romanticism of the nineteenth century. His last painting exhibition was "from landscape to abstraction," held at the Cultural Institute of Providencia, Montecarmelo in 2008. Made four exhibitions with more than one hundred pictures each one, attended by leading specialists.

== Poetry ==
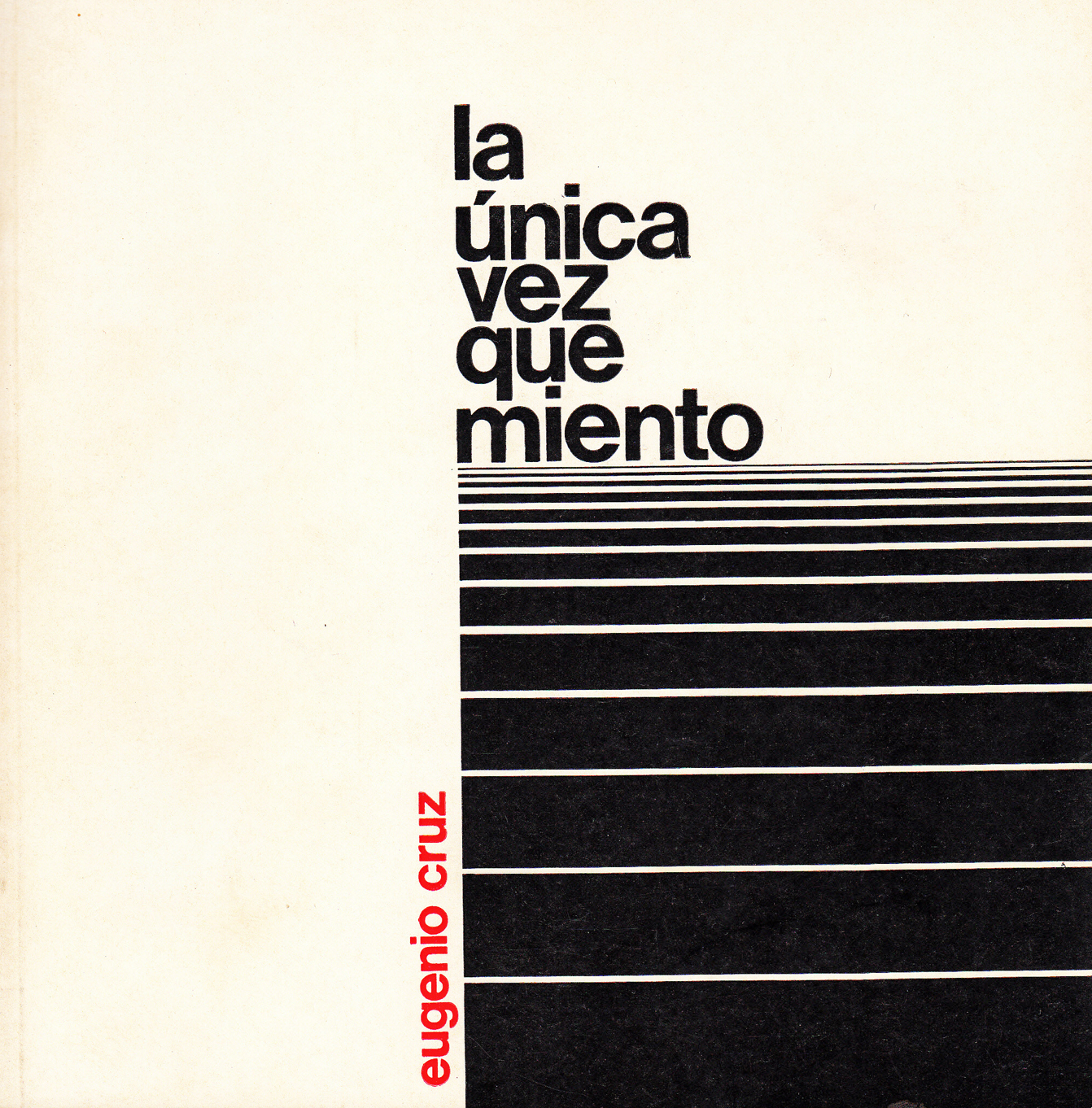
Poems 1978, Eugenio Cruz Vargas

His latest book, "From the Earthly to the Spatial" was presented on April 8, 2011 at the Cultural Institute of Providencia. The 250 pages book shows their experiences, feelings, loves, fears and emotions. According to the writer Maria Carolina Geel, in his text, Cruz Vargas keeps his flat and surreal poetic style, characterized by simple language instrumentalized to sublime love, life and nature. The poet Emilio Antilef, who prefaced, Cruz Vargas defined as "a child who does not renounce dreaming, the same as living with the adult life struggling to pieces and holds them with claws that poetry is capable of to find the magnitude of resources".

His two previous titles, "The only time I lie" (Editorial Universitaria, 1978) and "Sky" (Editorial Nascimento, 1980 ) were critically acclaimed in major national newspapers.

== Death ==
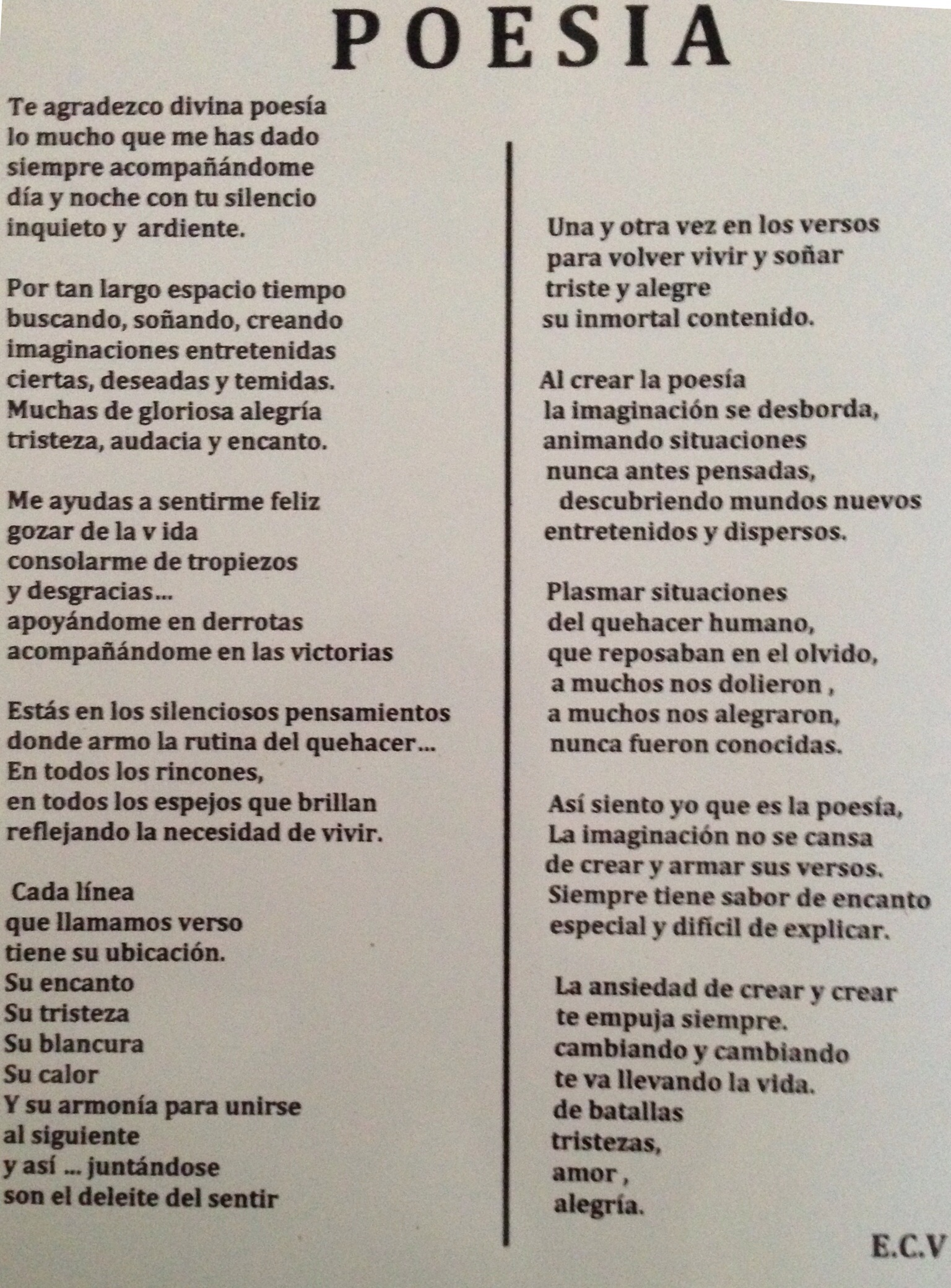
Poetry of Eugenio Cruz

In the first anniversary of his death on January 18, 2015, the foundation that takes his name published in the newspaper El Mercurio the following:

Today is the first anniversary of his departure to meeting God, the painter and poet Eugenio Cruz Vargas. His presence, at the same as the english artist William Blake (1757–1827), it will always reflected in his pictorial and literary work, a singular duplicity in Chile, the noblest way to perpetuate on the history of his country and transcend to future generations as model of effort and tenacity. Their actions was always creative, honest and responsible in all companies he undertook has the best expression in his family: he was an excellent husband, father, conductor, protector and a grandfather worthy of admiration and respect. On this day we remember him with the love that we always grant and reproduce, as a tribute to his figure, the last poem he wrote thanking the art that he developed in the poems and paintings.

== Selected list of Eugenio Cruz Vargas work ==
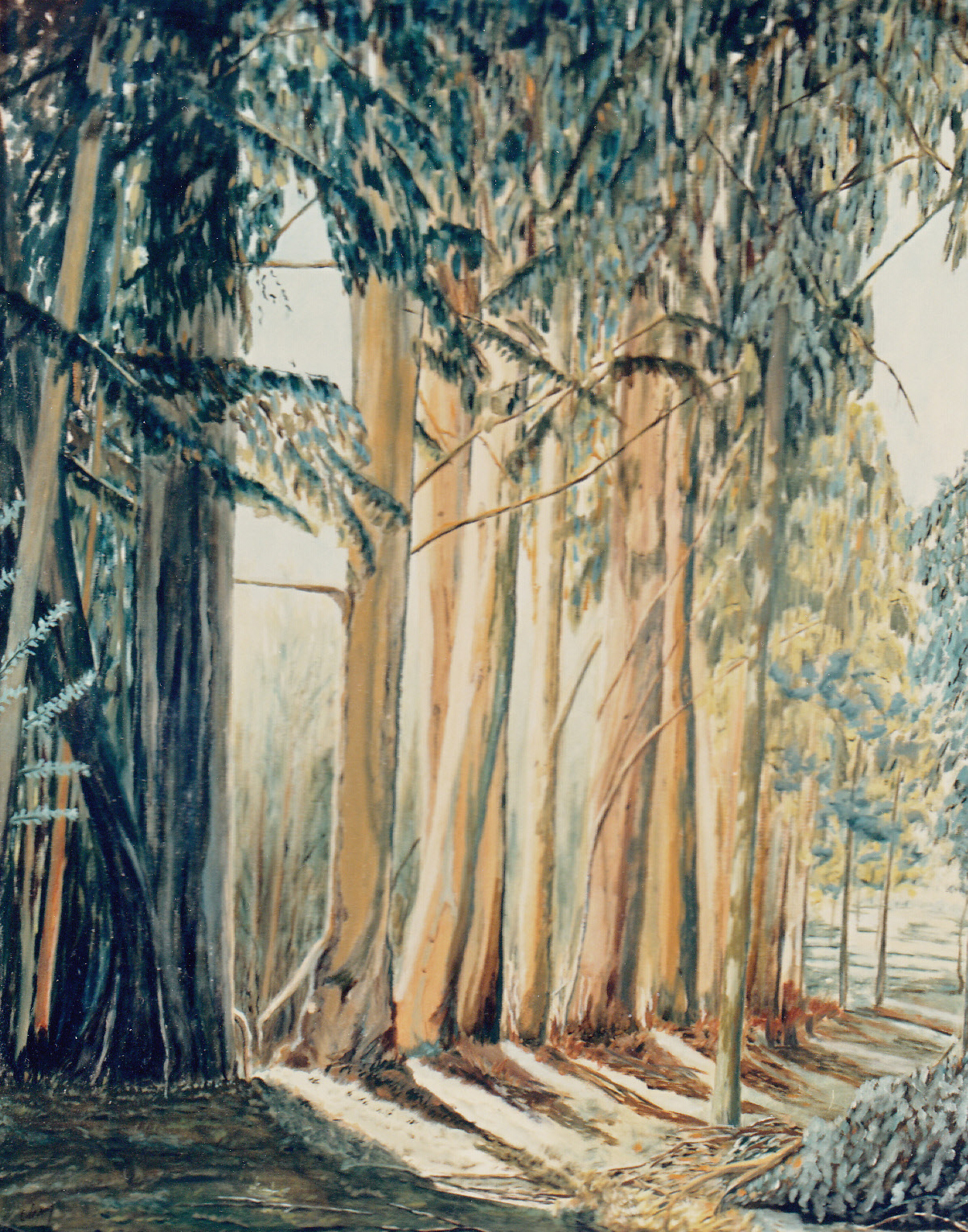
"Trasluz I"

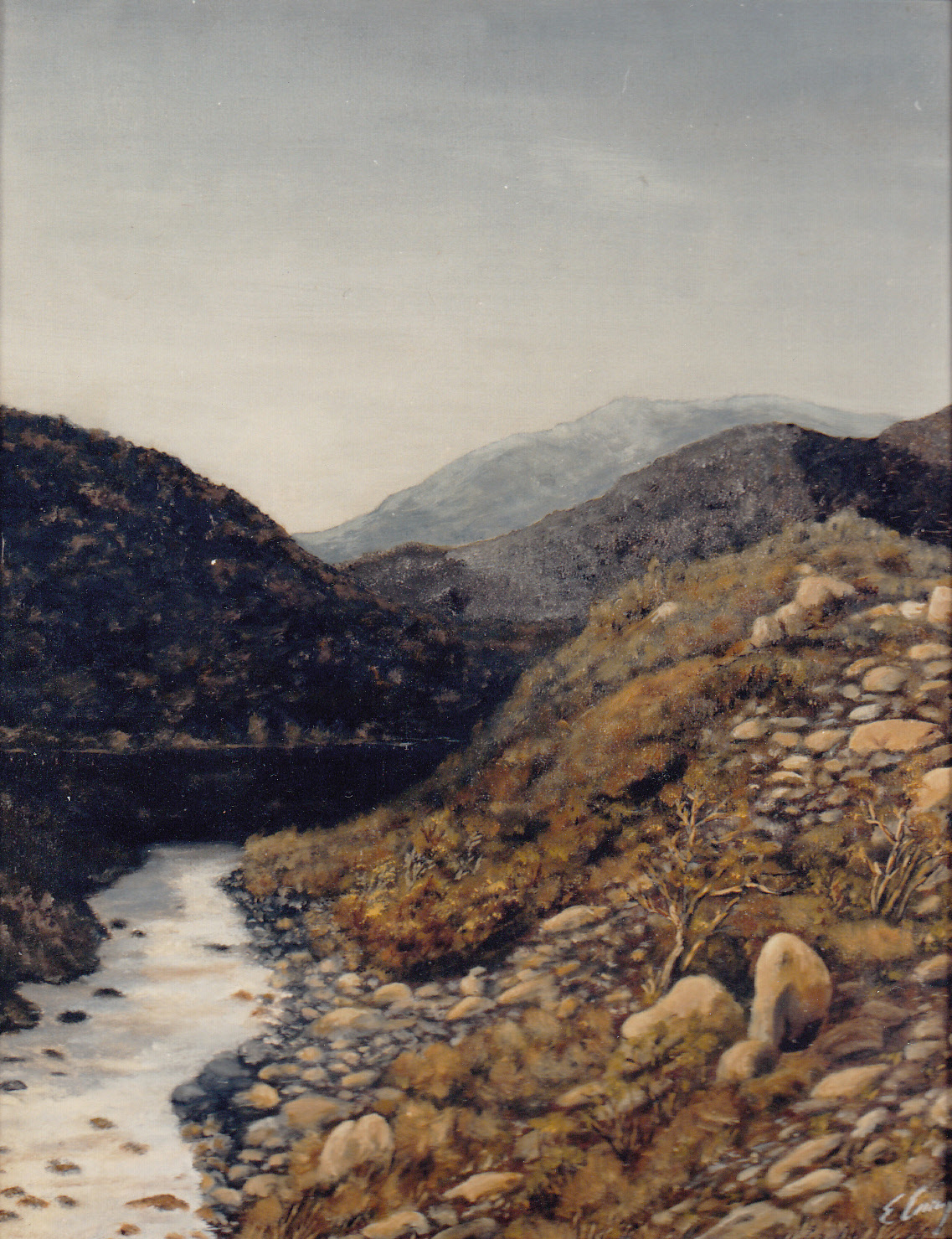
"Río Maipo"

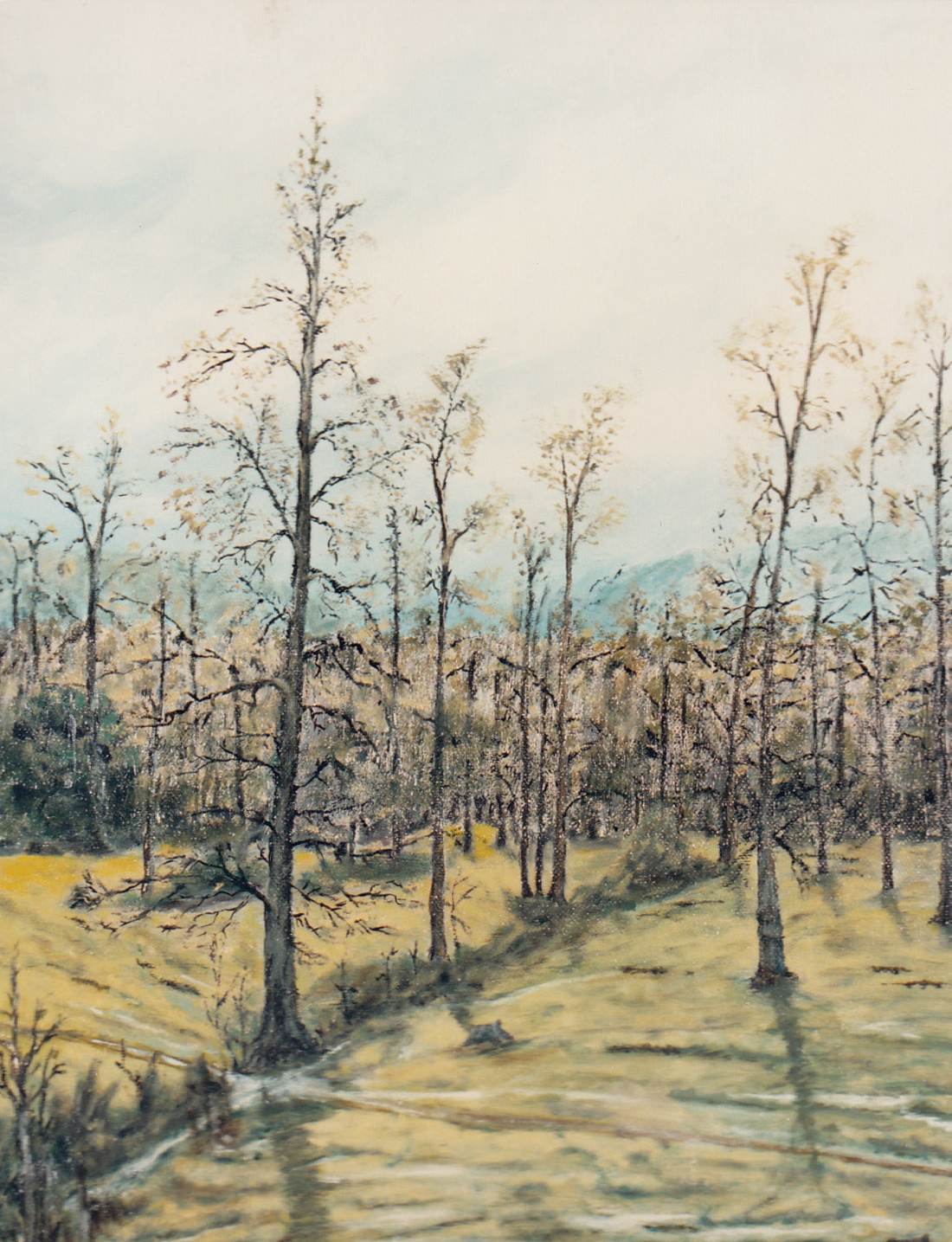
"Invernada en Ayentemo"

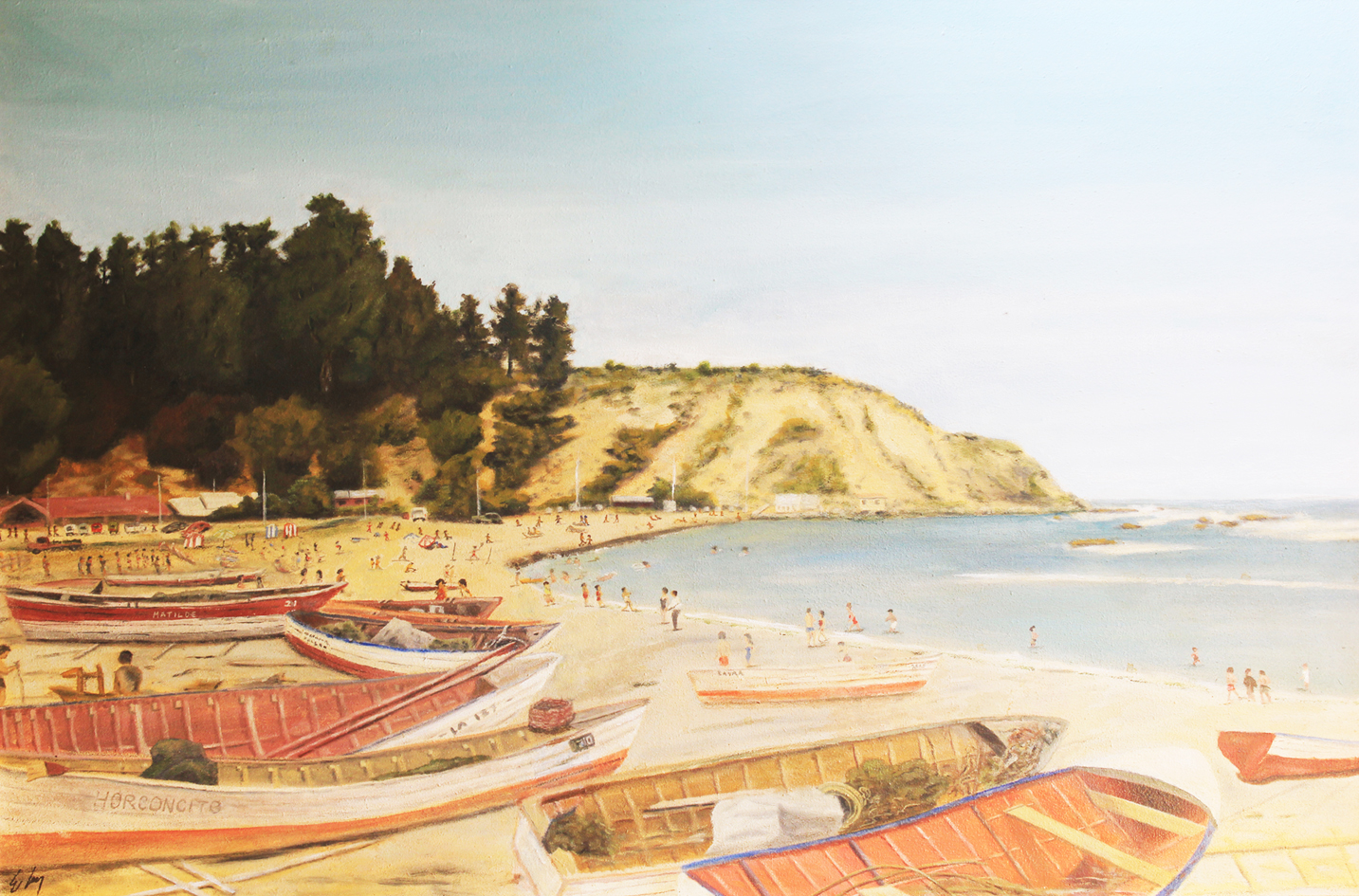
"Playa de Horcón"

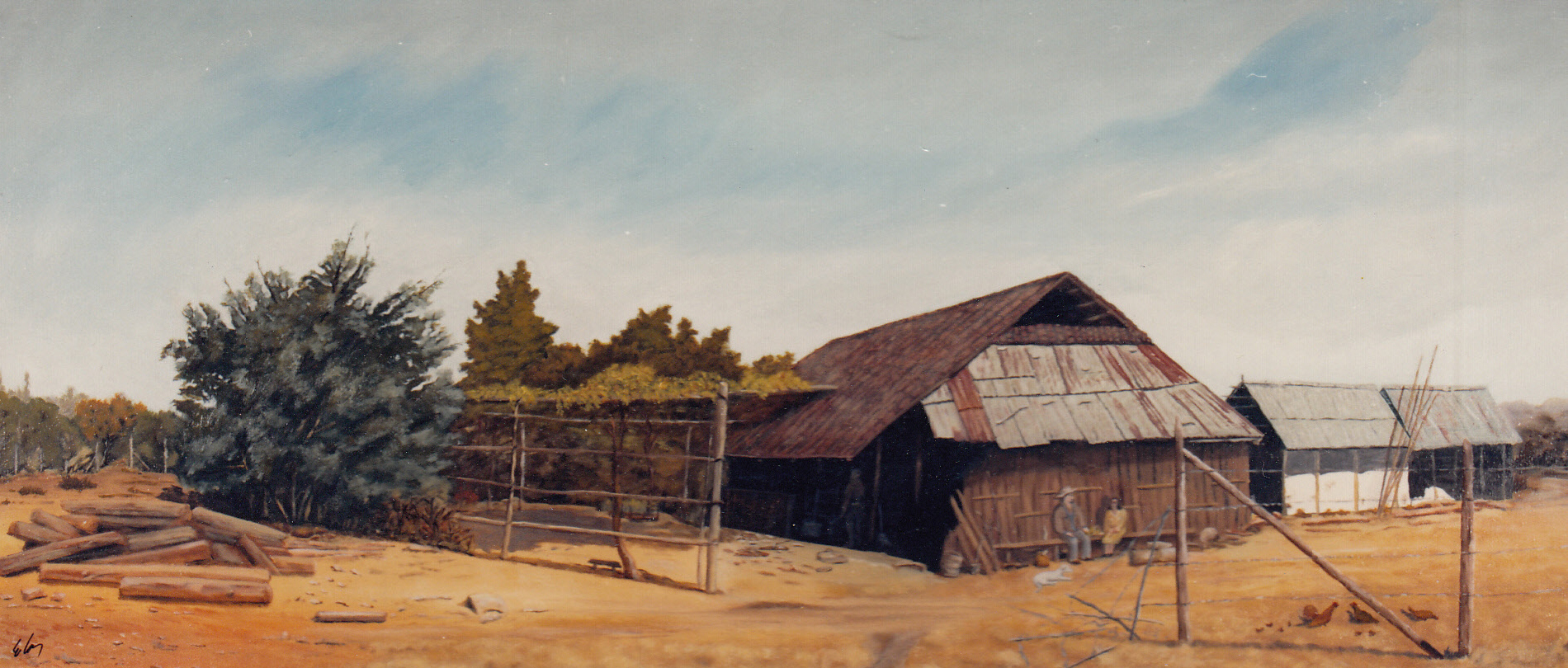
"Caserío en Puangue"

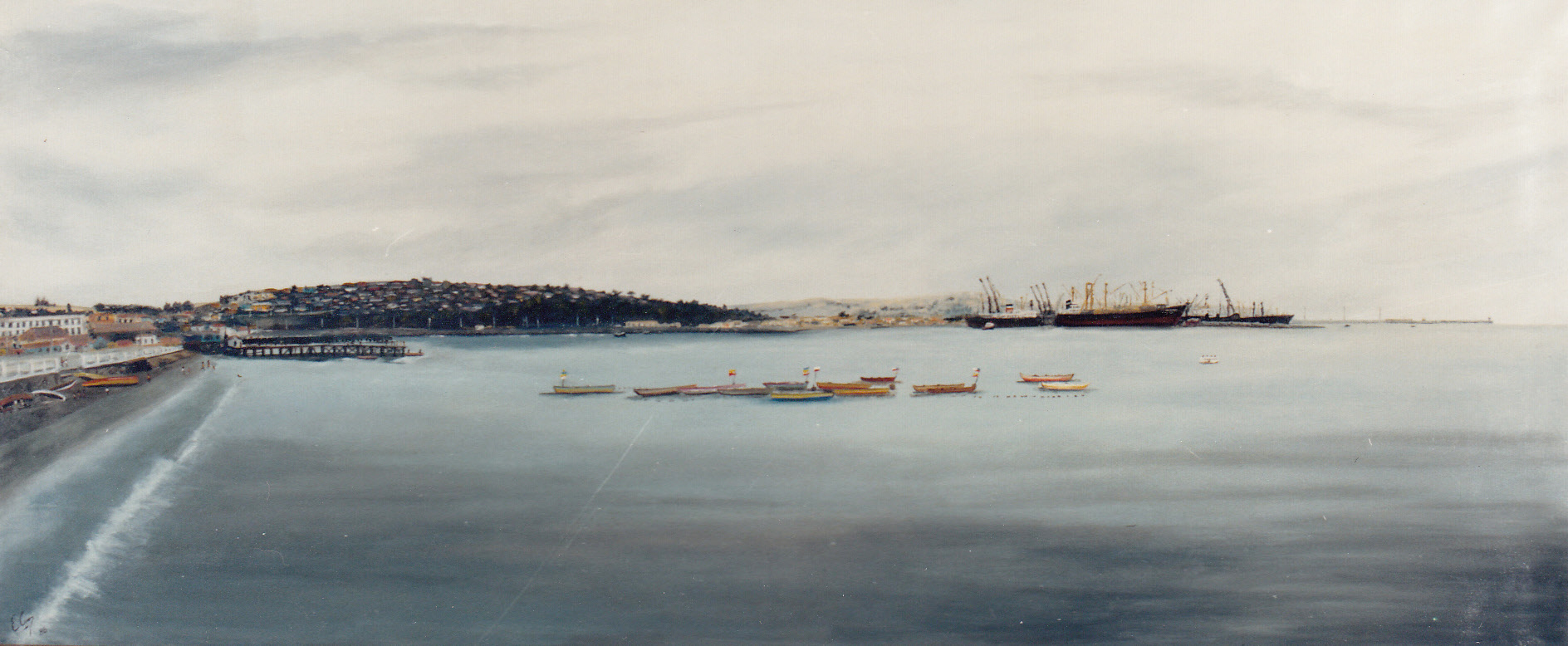
"Puerto de San Antonio"

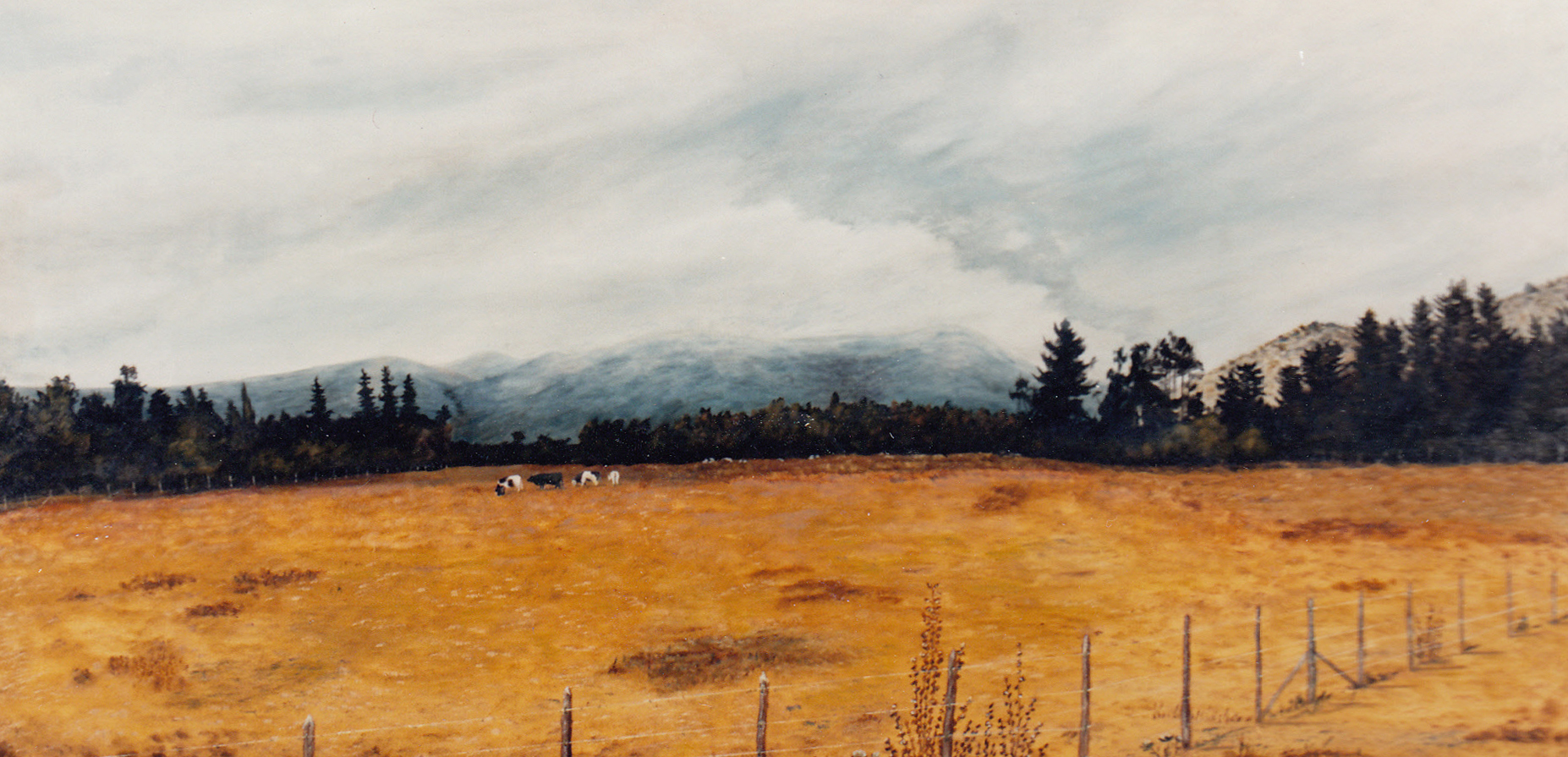
"Potrero en Melipilla"

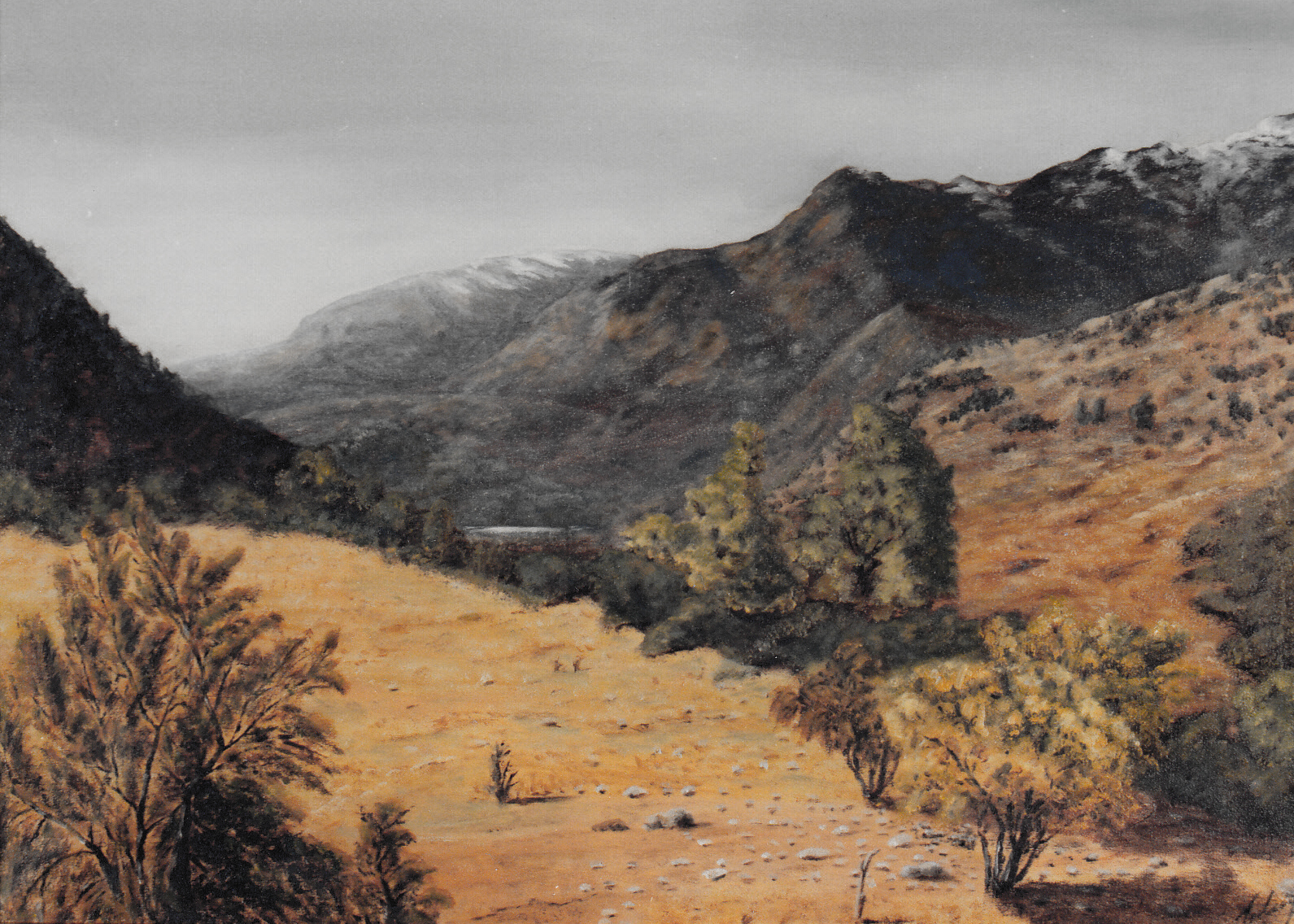
"Rincón en Cajón del Maipo"

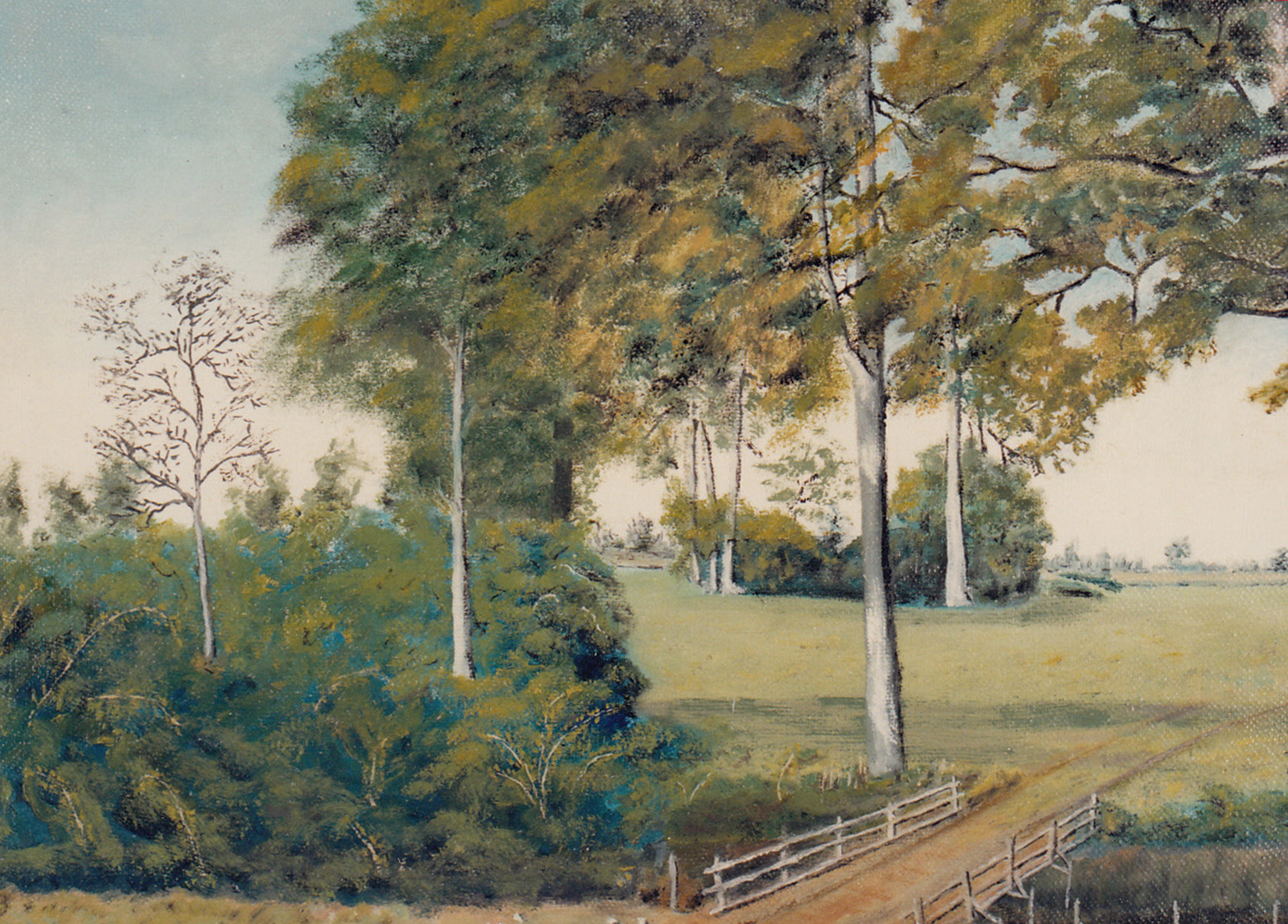
"Puente en Ayentemo"

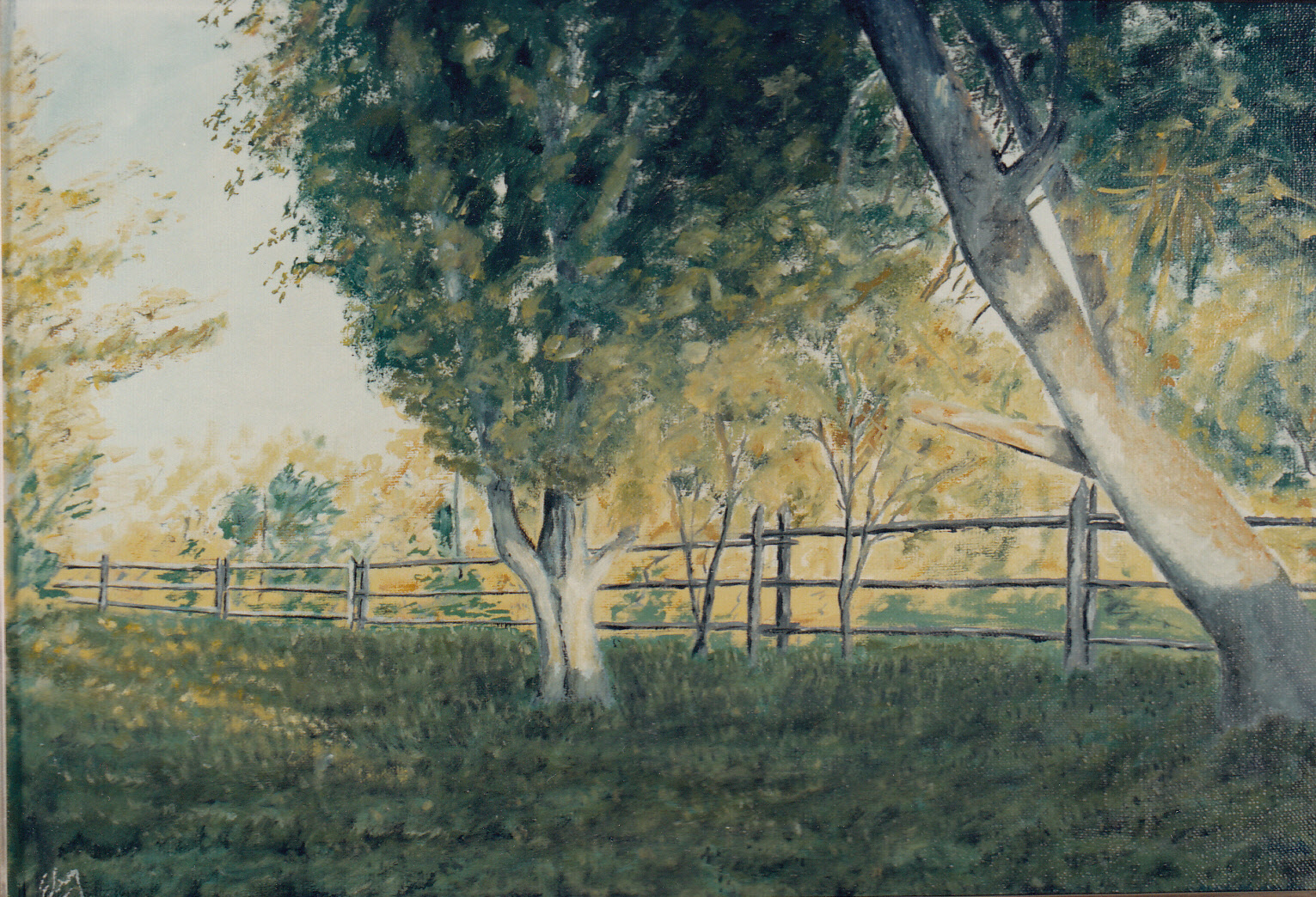
"Viejos manzanos"

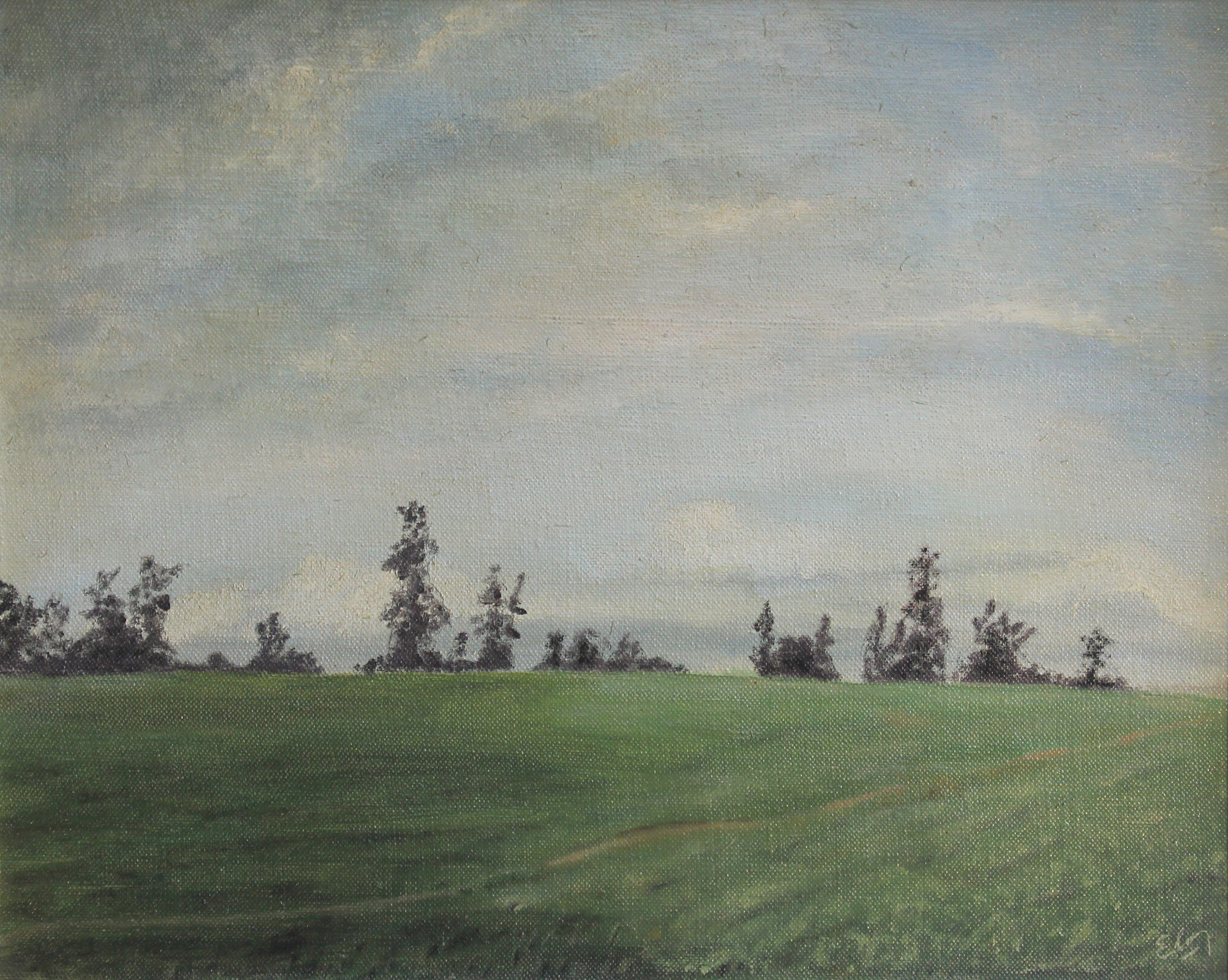
"Potrero en Ayentemo"

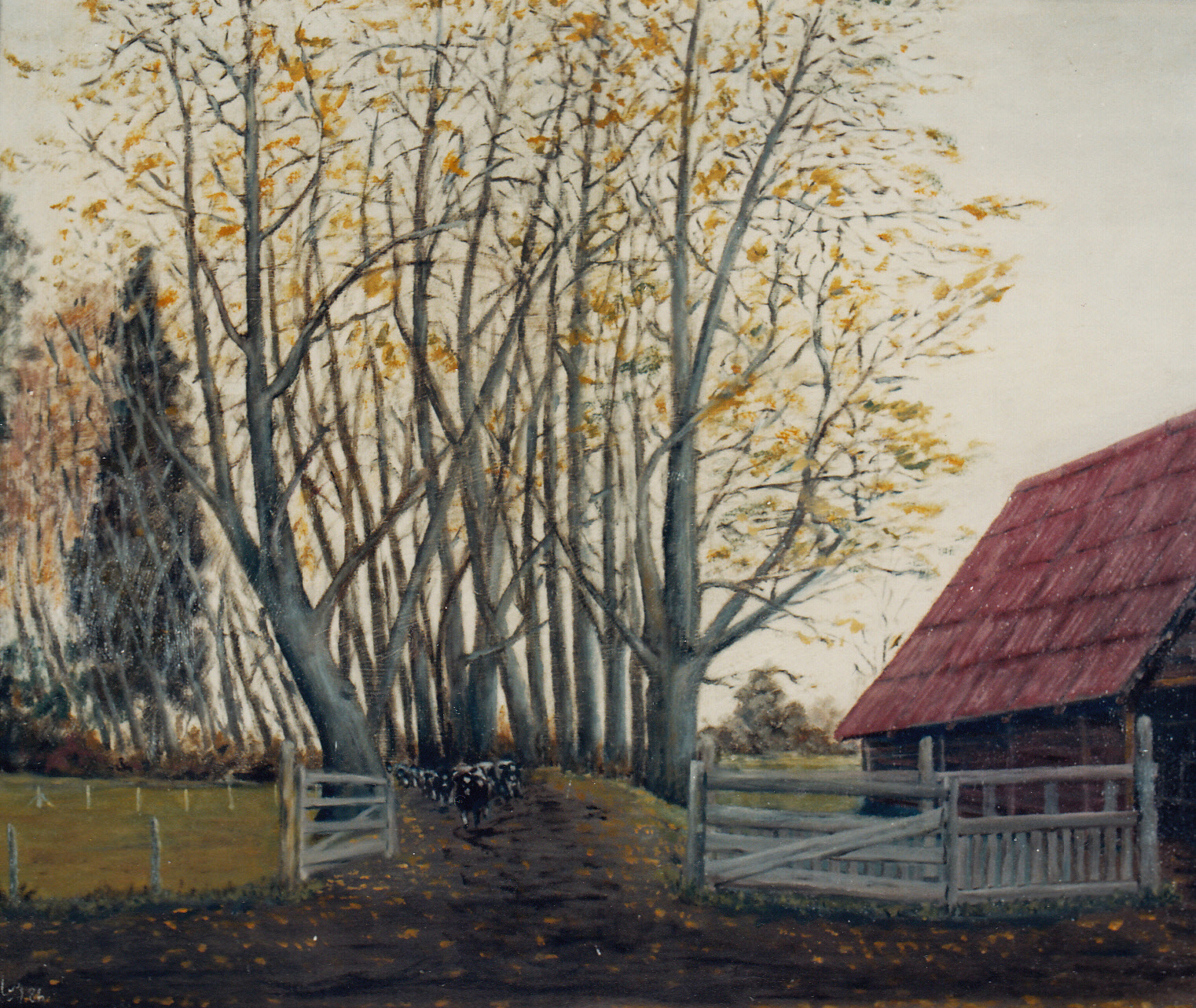
"Lechería en Río Bueno"

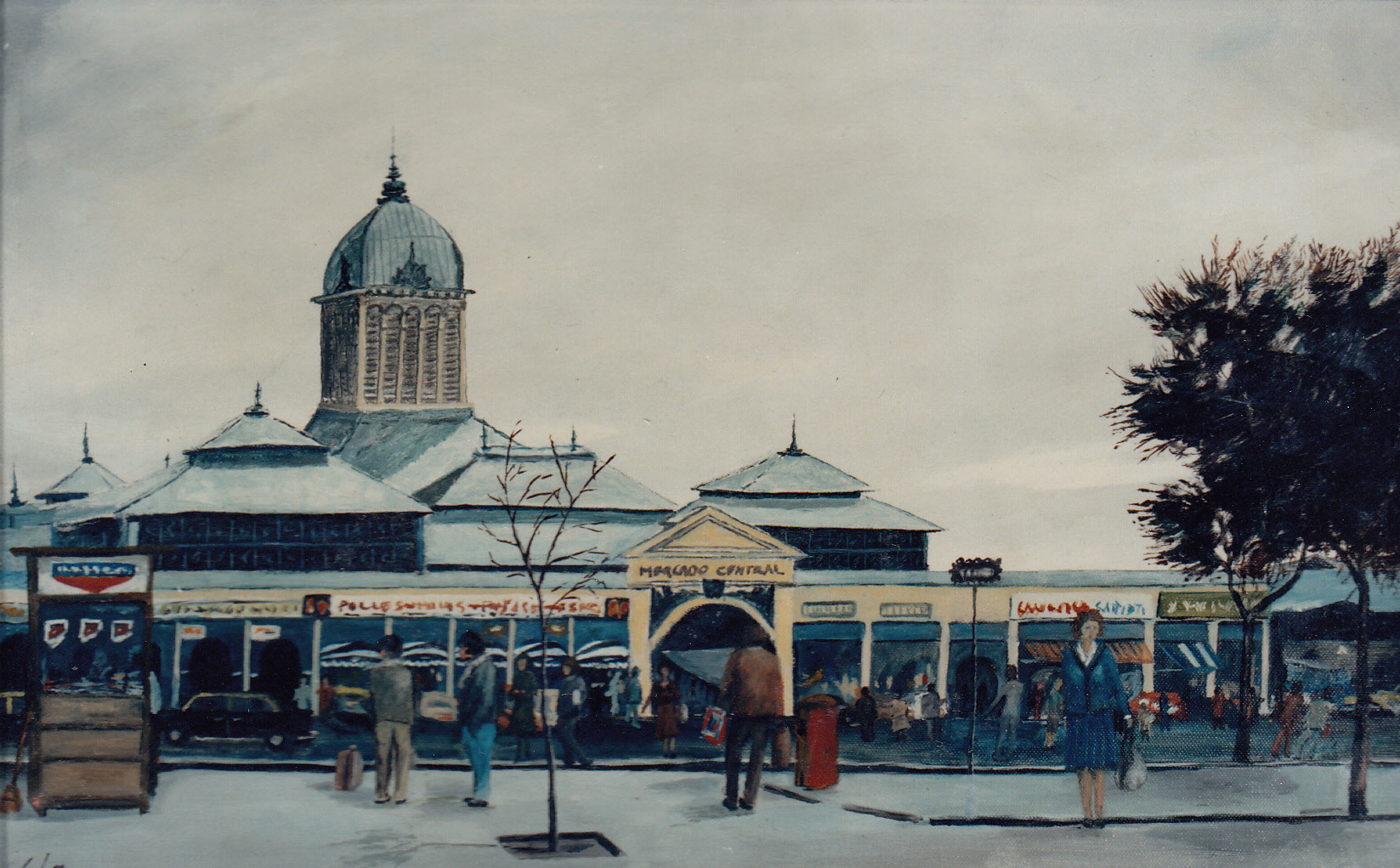
"Mercado Central de Santiago"

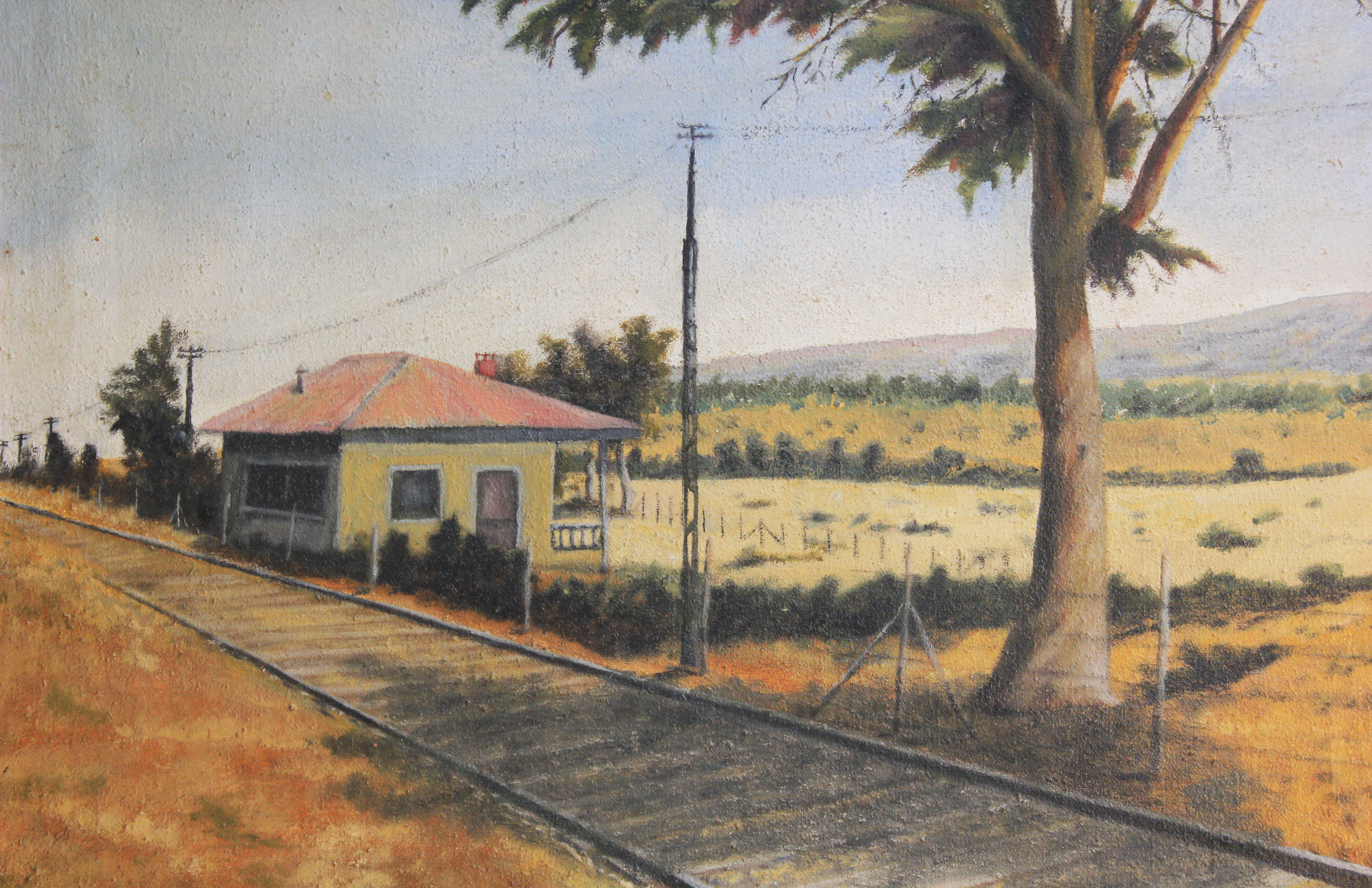
"Estación ferroviaria Puangue"

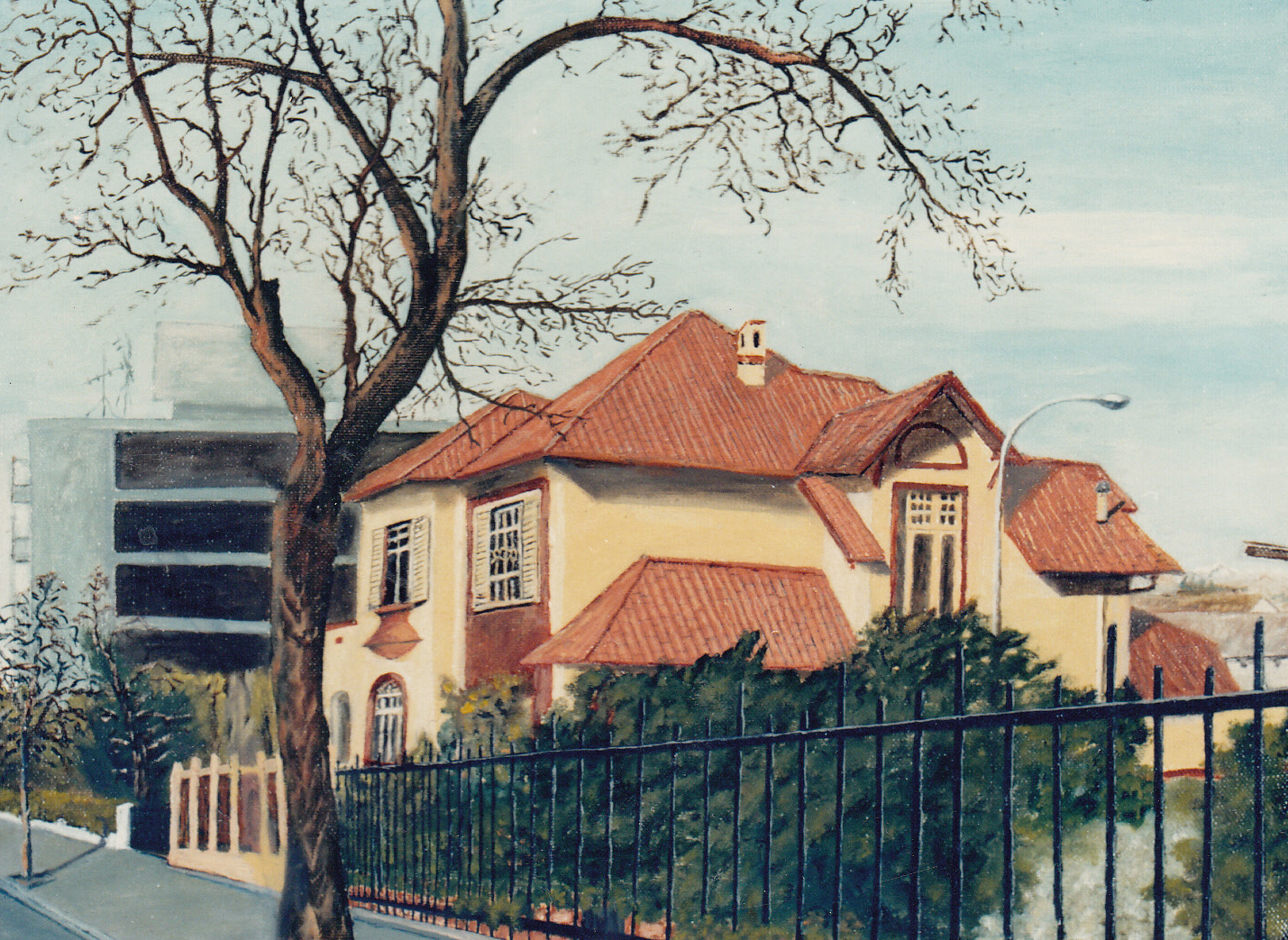
"Oficina en Providencia"

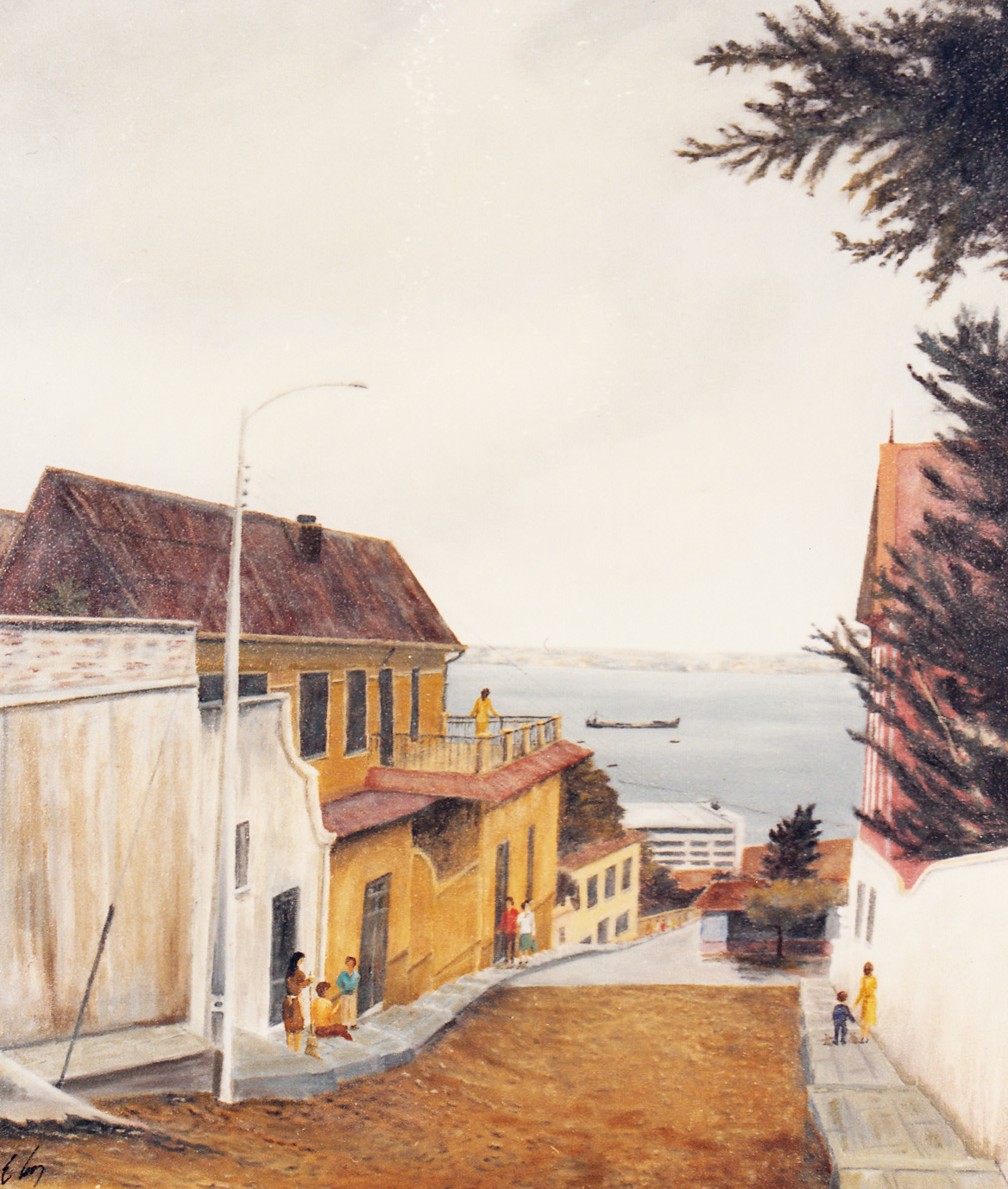
"Cerro Cordillera de Valparaíso"

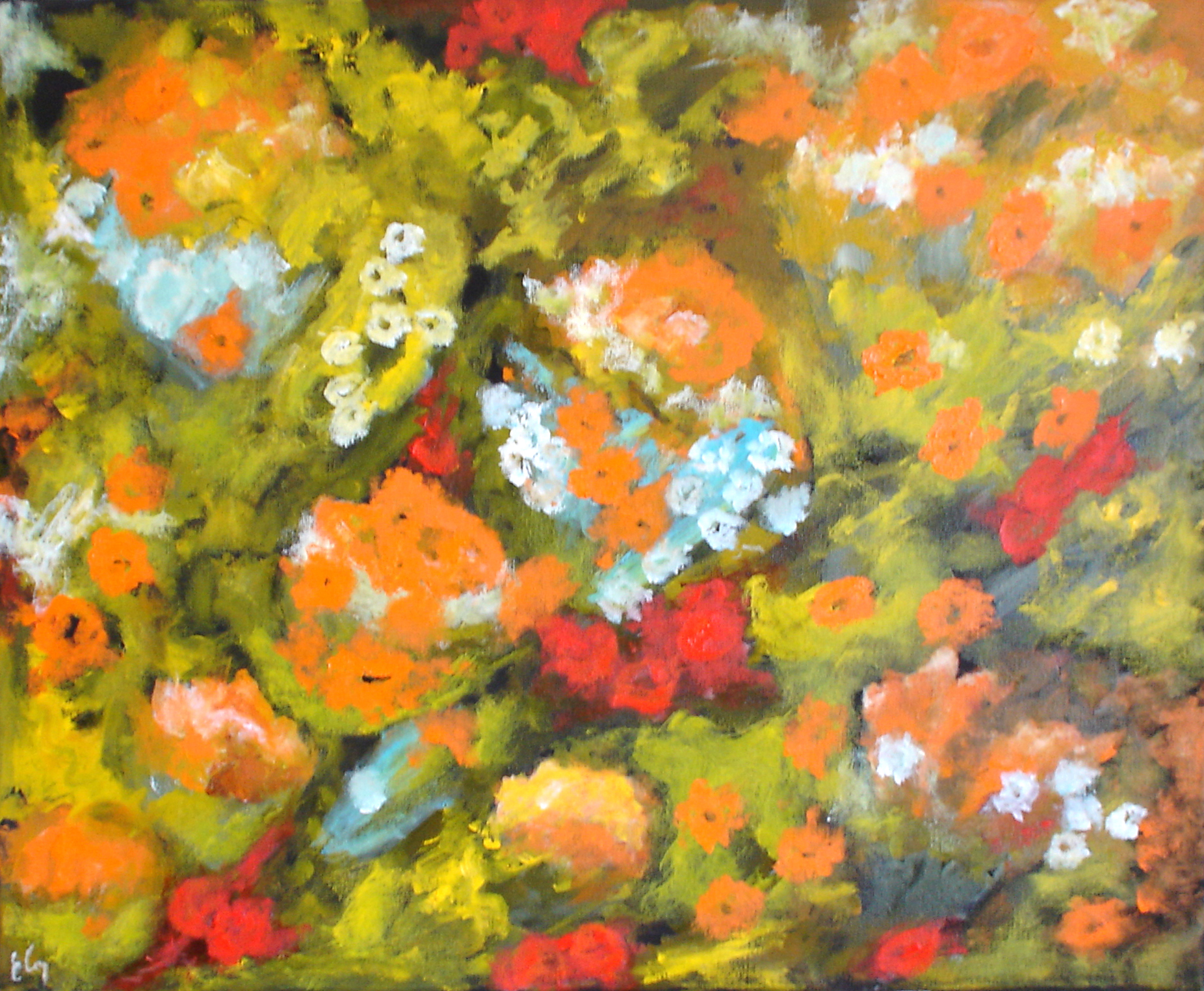
"Florecillas"

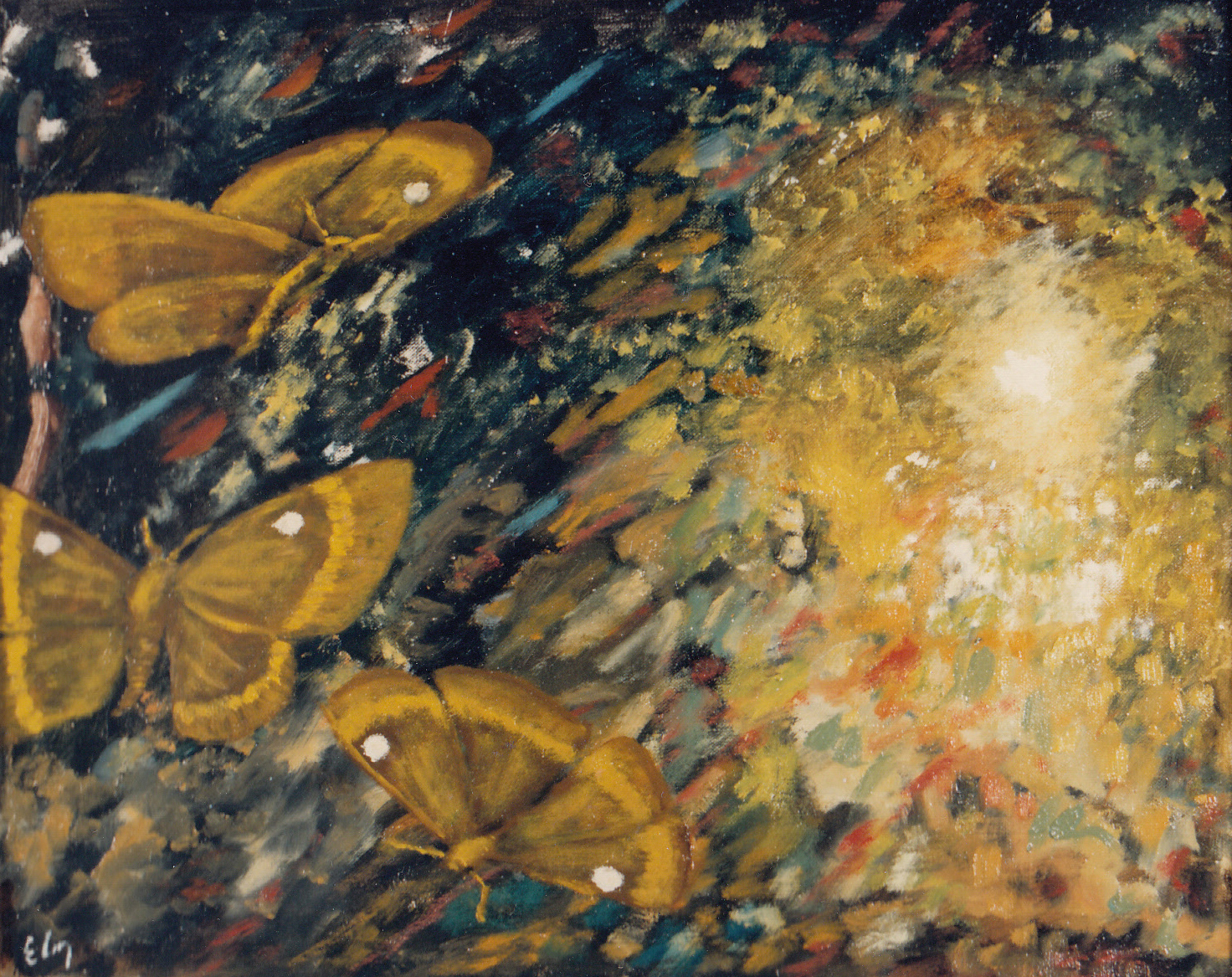
"Atracción destellante"

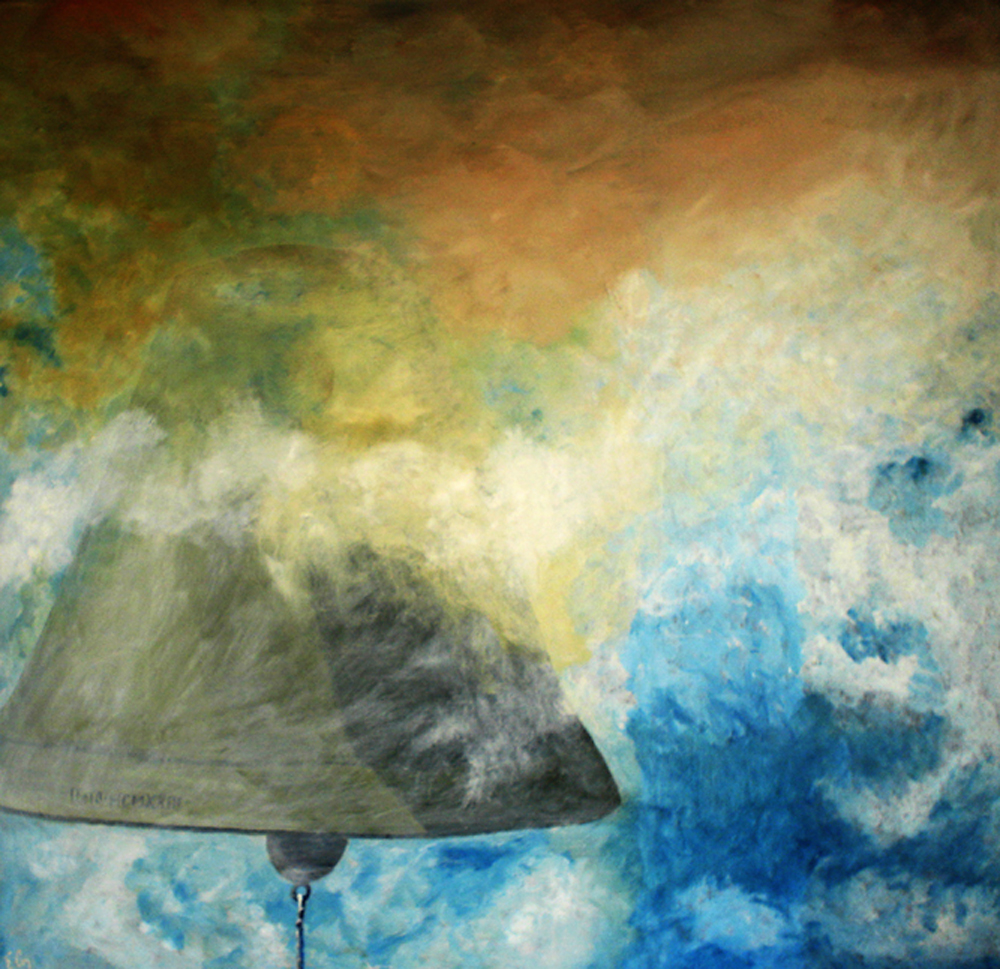
"Campanil ascendiendo"

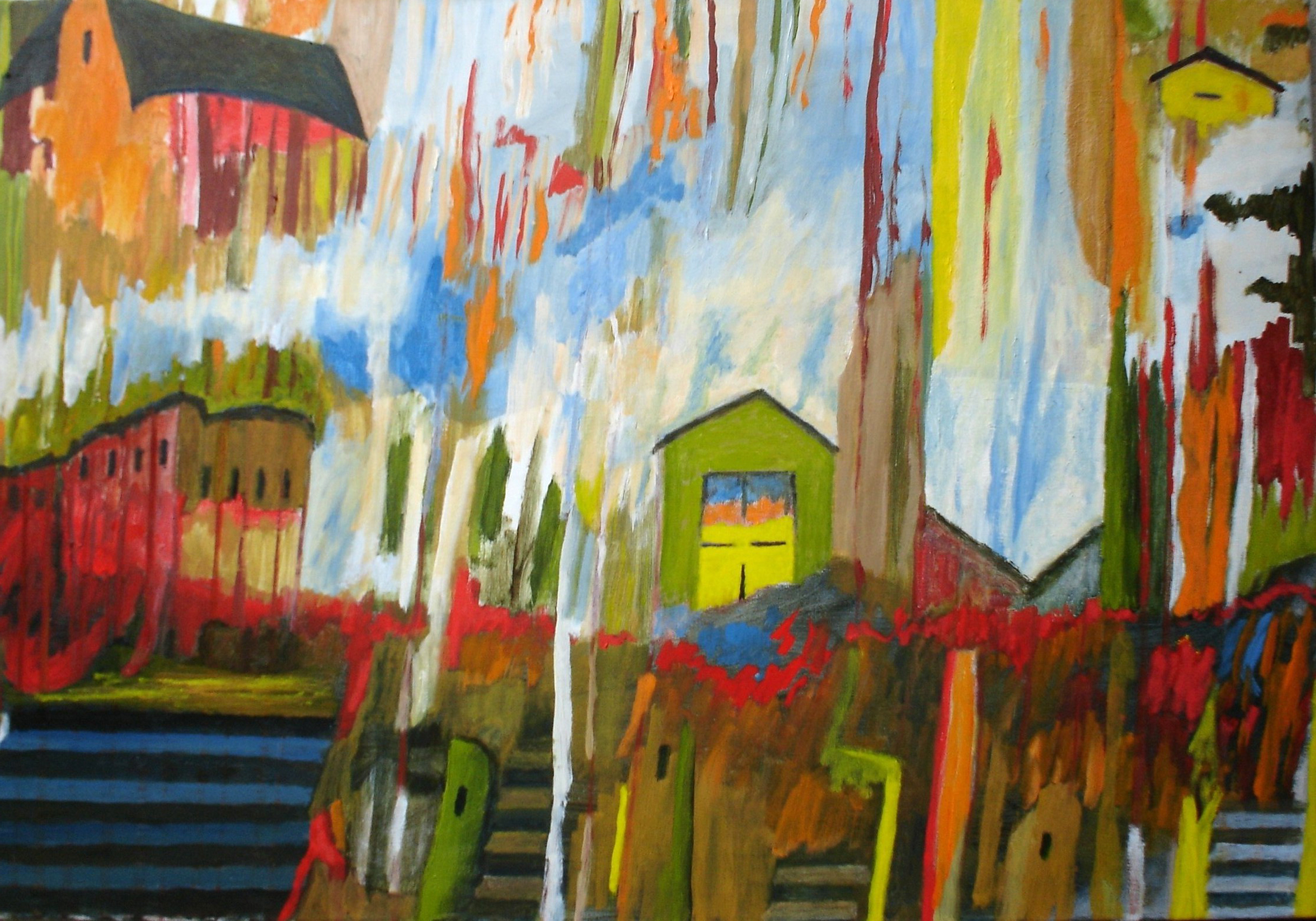
"Multicolores porteños II"

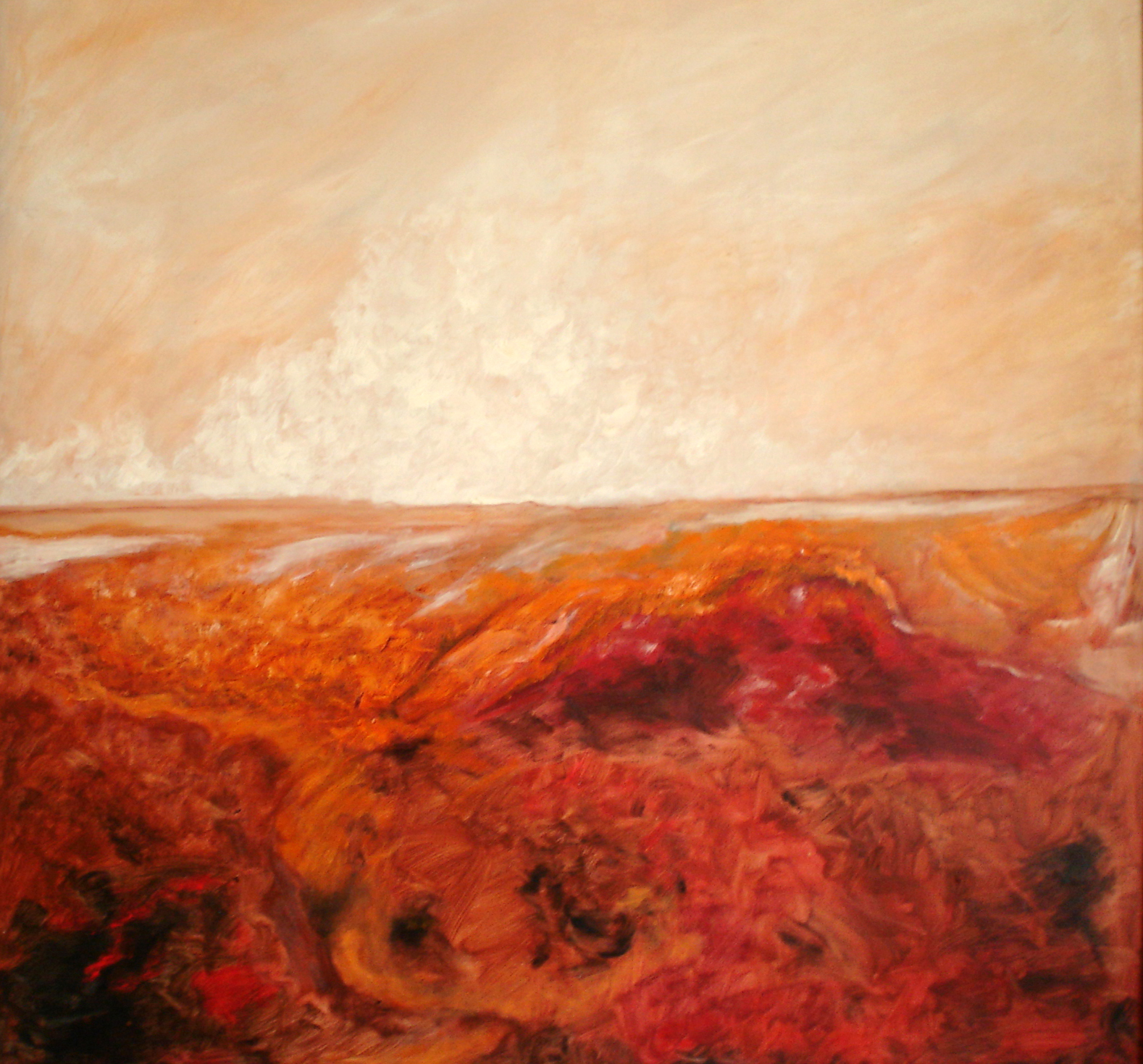
"Paisaje a un color"

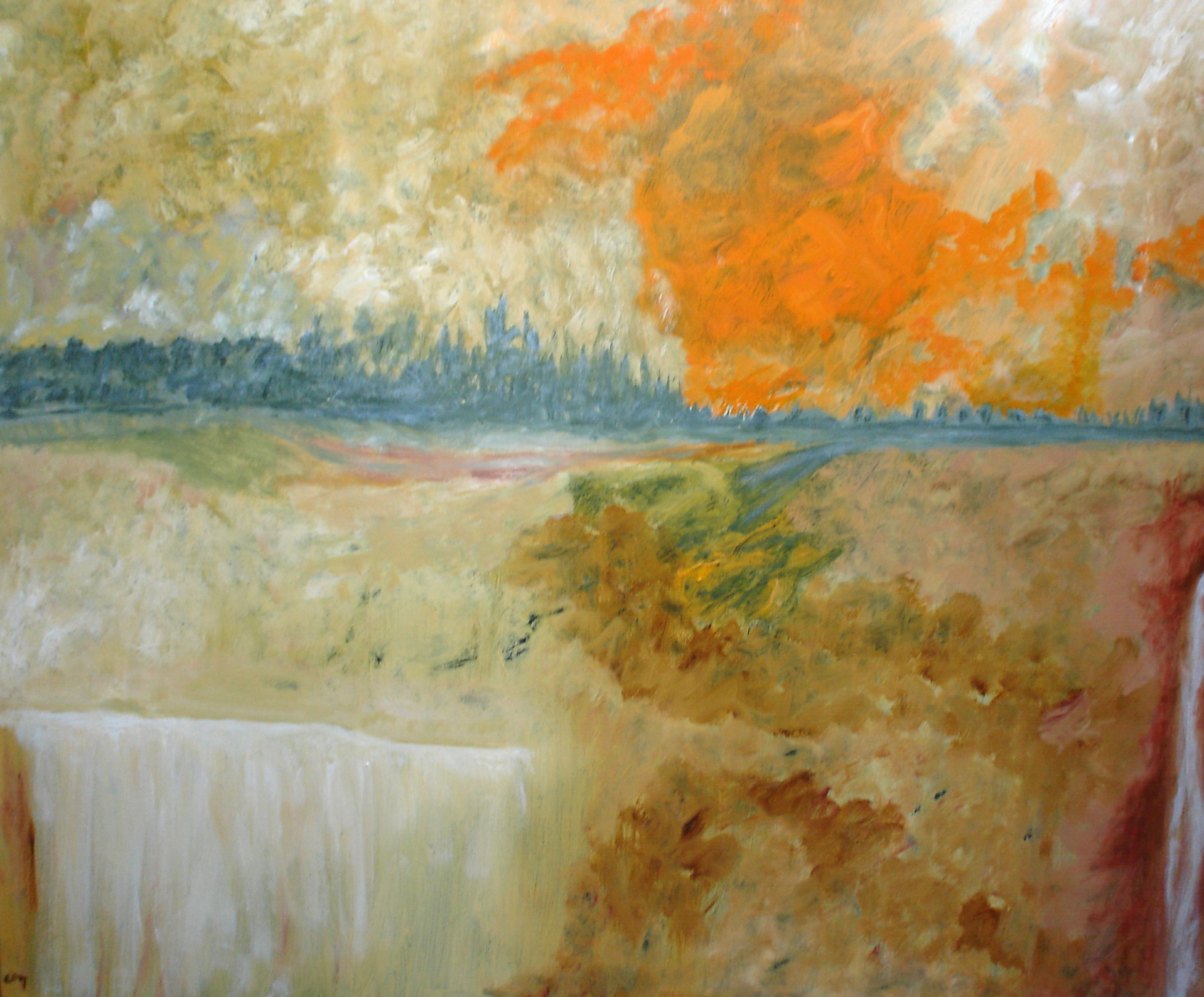
"Cascada rompiente."

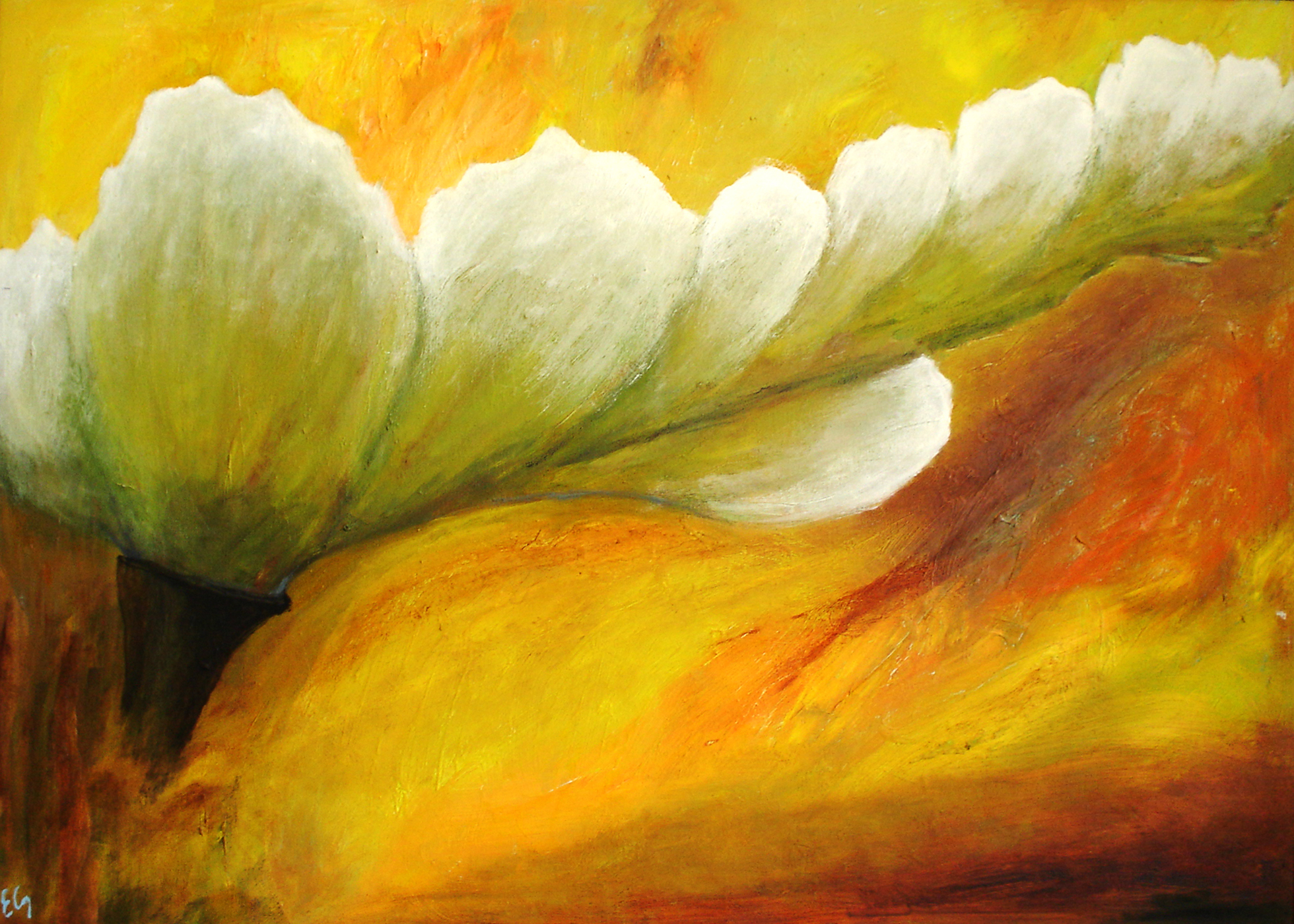
"Inflorescencia vital"

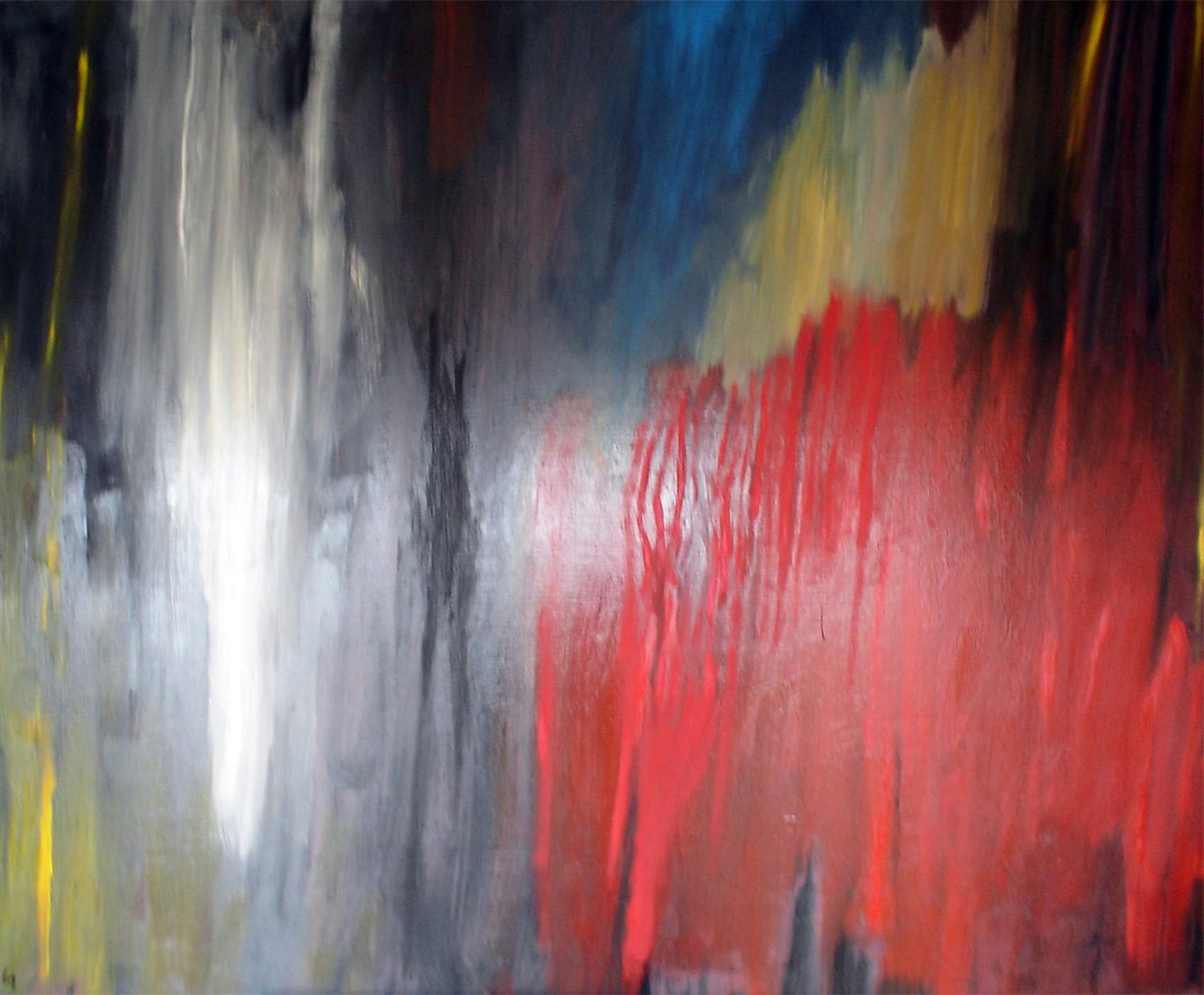
"Sombras de colores"
