= Pedro Nolasco Cruz Vergara =

Chilean literary critic, writer and politician (1857–1939)

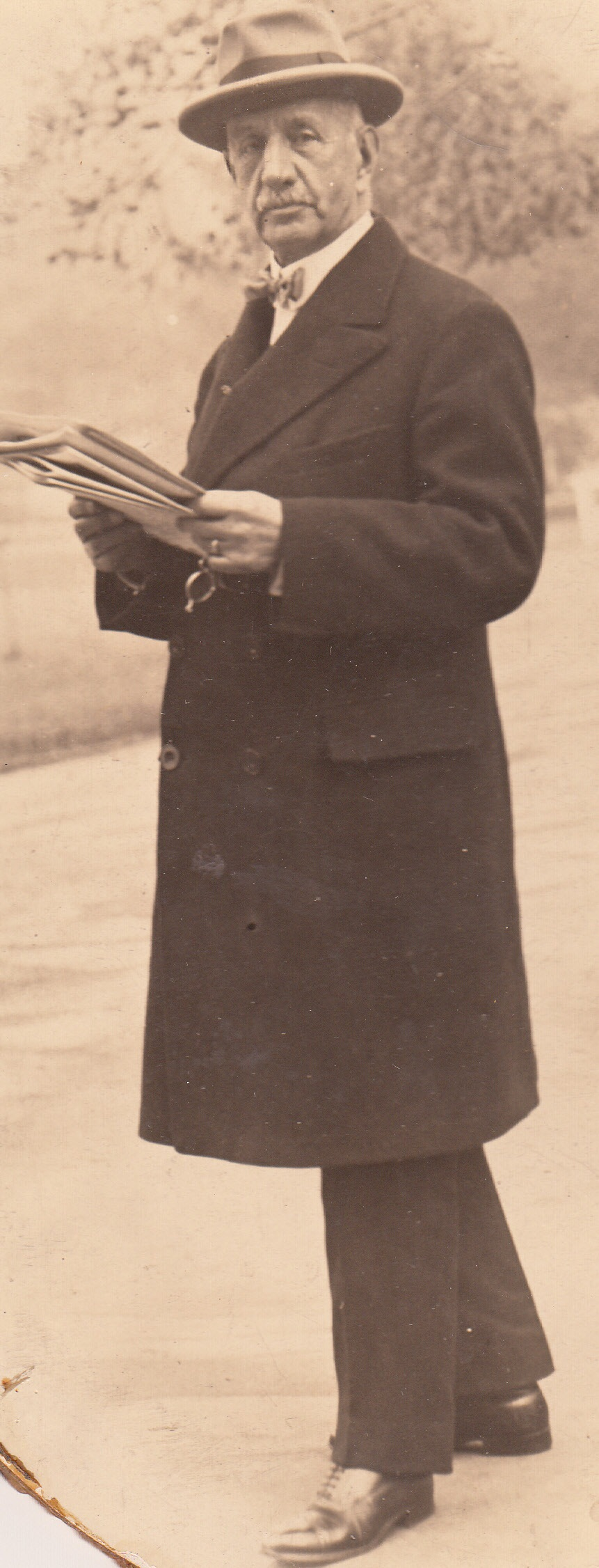
- Born: Pedro Nolasco Cruz Vergara; April 18, 1857; Molina, Chile
- Died: November 11, 1939; Santiago, Chile
- Writing career
- Genre: Literary criticism

Pedro Nolasco Cruz Vergara (April 18, 1857 – November 11, 1939) was a Chilean literary critic, novelist, writer, and politician.

== Early life ==
Pedro Nolasco Cruz Vergara was born in Molina, Maule Region in central Chile. He was the son of Nicolás de la Cruz Donoso (1827–1860) and Elisa Martinez de Vergara y Loys. His mother was the eldest daughter of Chilean legislator Pedro Nolasco Vergara Albano and Mercedes Vergara-Loys. He was the grandson of Vicente de La Cruz y Bahamonde the nephew and grandson of Nicolas de La Cruz y Bahamonde and Anselmo de La Cruz y Bahamonde. He had one sister, Elisa Cruz Vergara, who married Francisco Javier Sanchez Fresno in 1885.

His paternal great-grandfather, Vicente de la Cruz y Bahamonde, was the brother of Nicolas de la Cruz y Bahamonde, the first Conde de Maule, and the Chilean Minister of Finance Anselmo de La Cruz y Bahamonde.

== Career ==
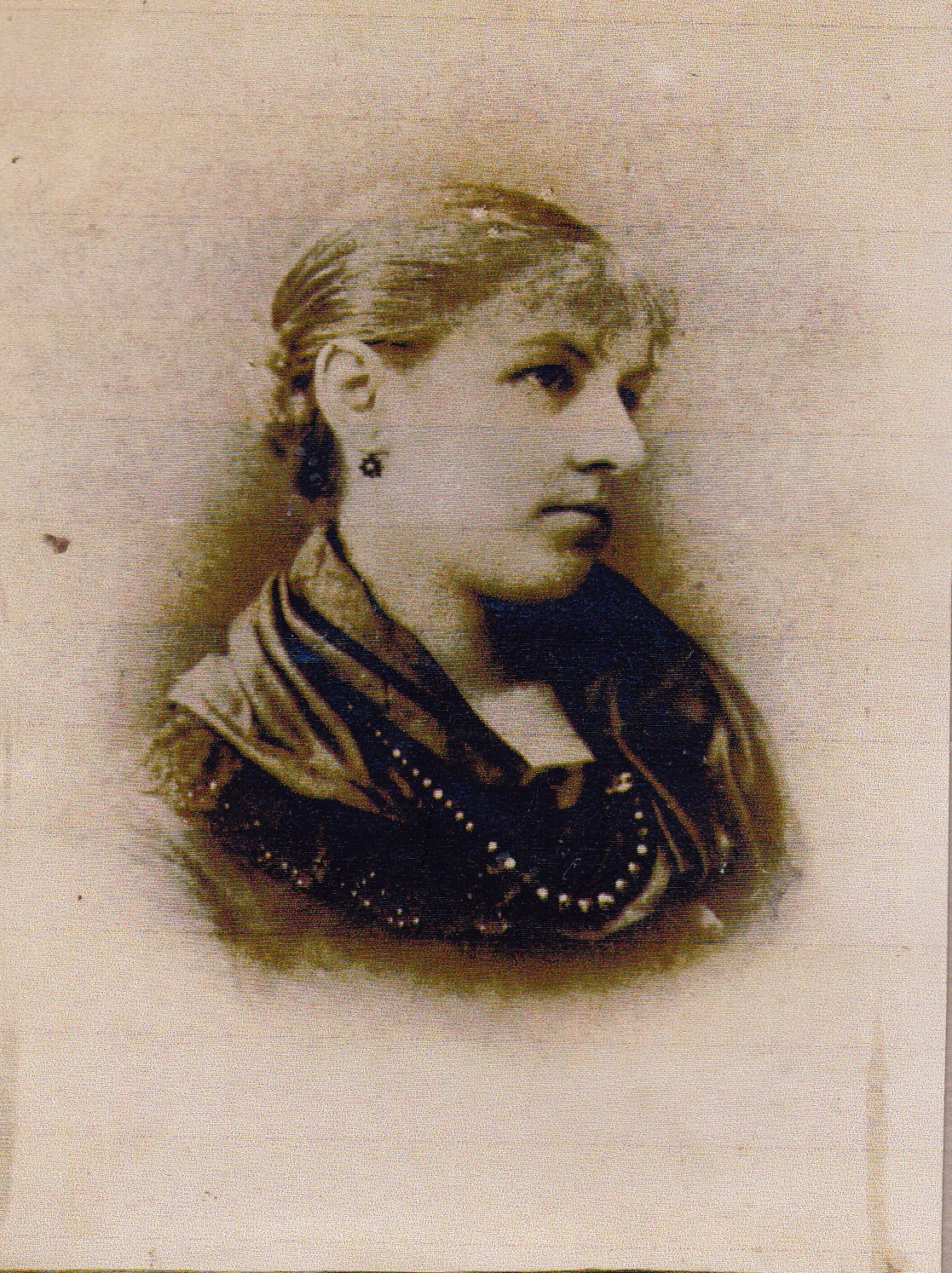
Susana Correa Vergara de Cruz

He married Susana Correa Vergara (January 10, 1862 – January 31, 1953), his first cousin. The couple had 9 children: Fabio, Nicolás, Pedro Nolasco, Susana, Elisa, Mercedes, Julia, Eduardo and Manuel. Painter and poet Eugenio Cruz Vargas (1923–2014) was one of his grandchildren.

=== Education ===
He attended the College of Parent Escolapios Santiago de Chile. His secondary education came at the College of the Sacred Hearts of Santiago and College of the French Parents. He graduated as a lawyer from the Universidad de Chile on October 27, 1877.

== Career ==
=== Literary critic and writer ===
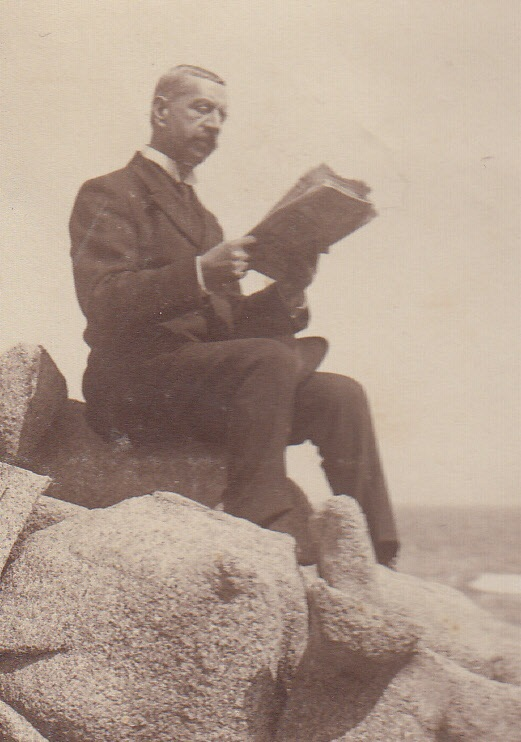
Pedro Nolasco Cruz Vergara in Cartagena, Chile

He was a literary critic and writer on cultural nationalism. He is the author of the successful novels Fantasias Humoriscicas (1881), Estaban (1883), The Passage of Venus (1884), and Flor de Campo (1886). He is mainly remembered for his essays on Chilean literature. These works of analysis and literary criticism include Platicas Literarias (1889), Critical studies to don José Victorino Lastarrias (1917), Studies on Chilean literature (1926–1940, 3 vols.), "Desolation" by Gabriela Mistral and "Al vivir" by Francisco Concha and Castillo (1929), Biography Carlos Walker Martínez (1904), Tales (1930) and the posthumous book entitled Bilbao and Lastarrias (1944).

=== Professor and literary chronicler ===
He was a literary critic for the newspapers El Independiente, La Union and El Diario Ilustrado until his death. In addition, he taught literature at the Universidad de Chile, and College French brothers.

== Personal life ==
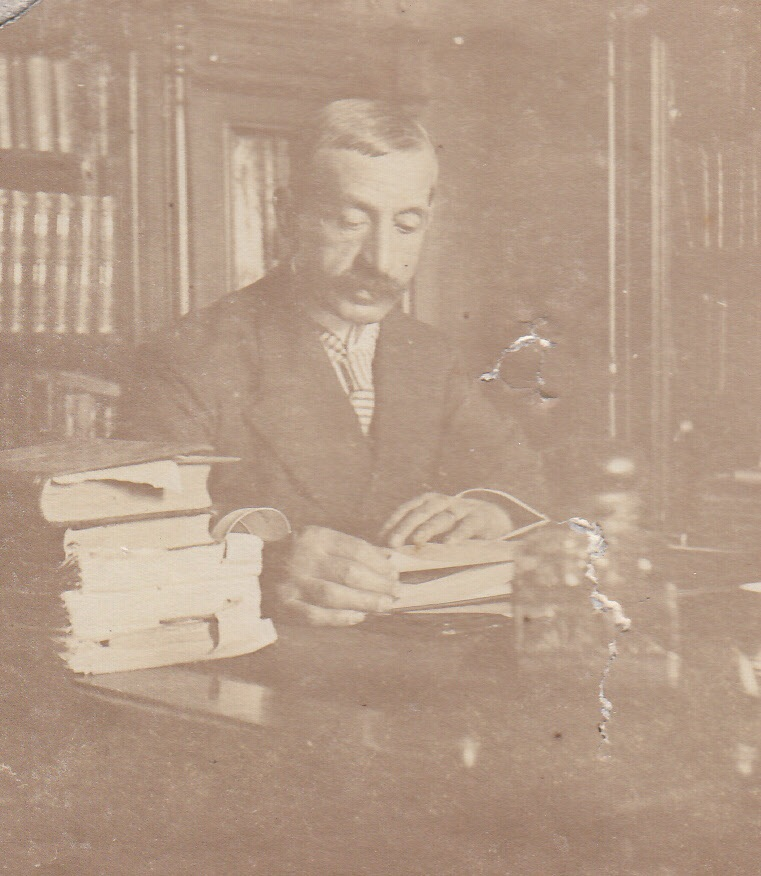
Pedro Nolasco Cruz Vergara, Notary public, 1918

He was the secretary of war (1903–1913), notary public of finance of Santiago (1913 and 1939), and secretary-general of the Conservative Party (1901 to 1928).

He was the owner of Molino ranch (1877–1939) and Viña Antivero (1897–1939), in the commune of Rome, in the department of San Fernando. He died in Santiago de Chile.

== Some editions ==
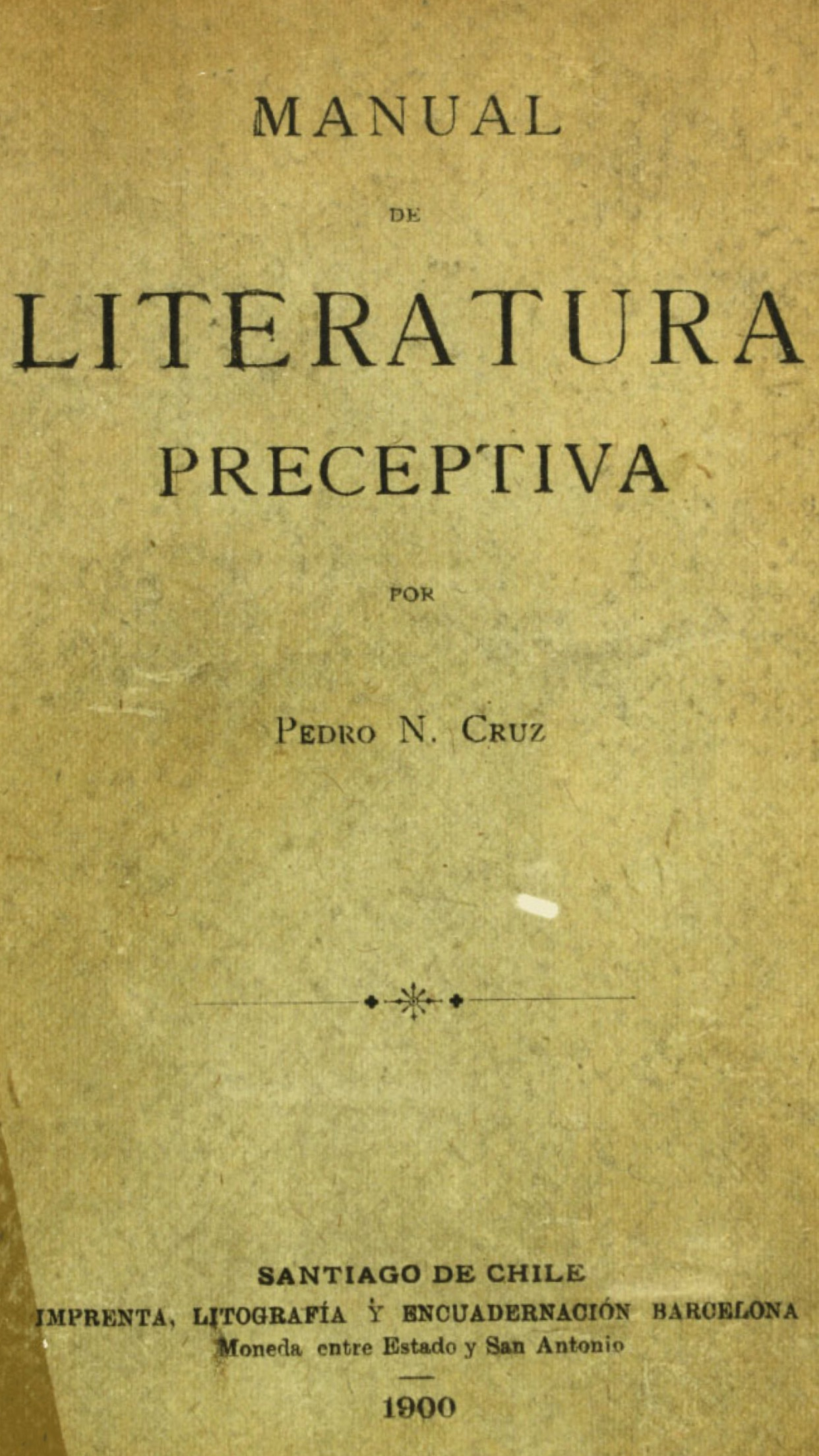
Manual de Literatura Preceptiva, 1900.

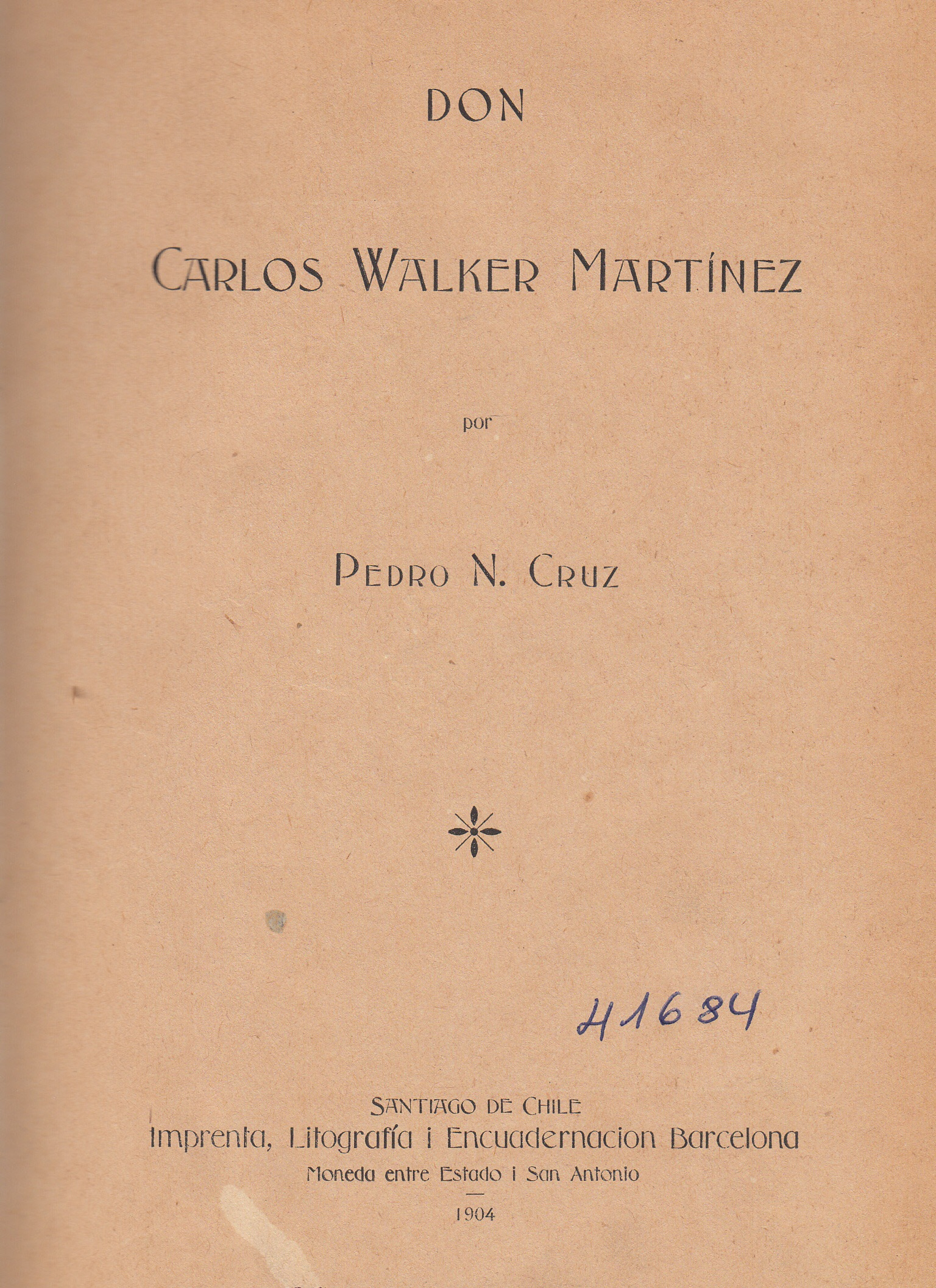
Don Carlos Walker Martínez, Biografía, 1904.

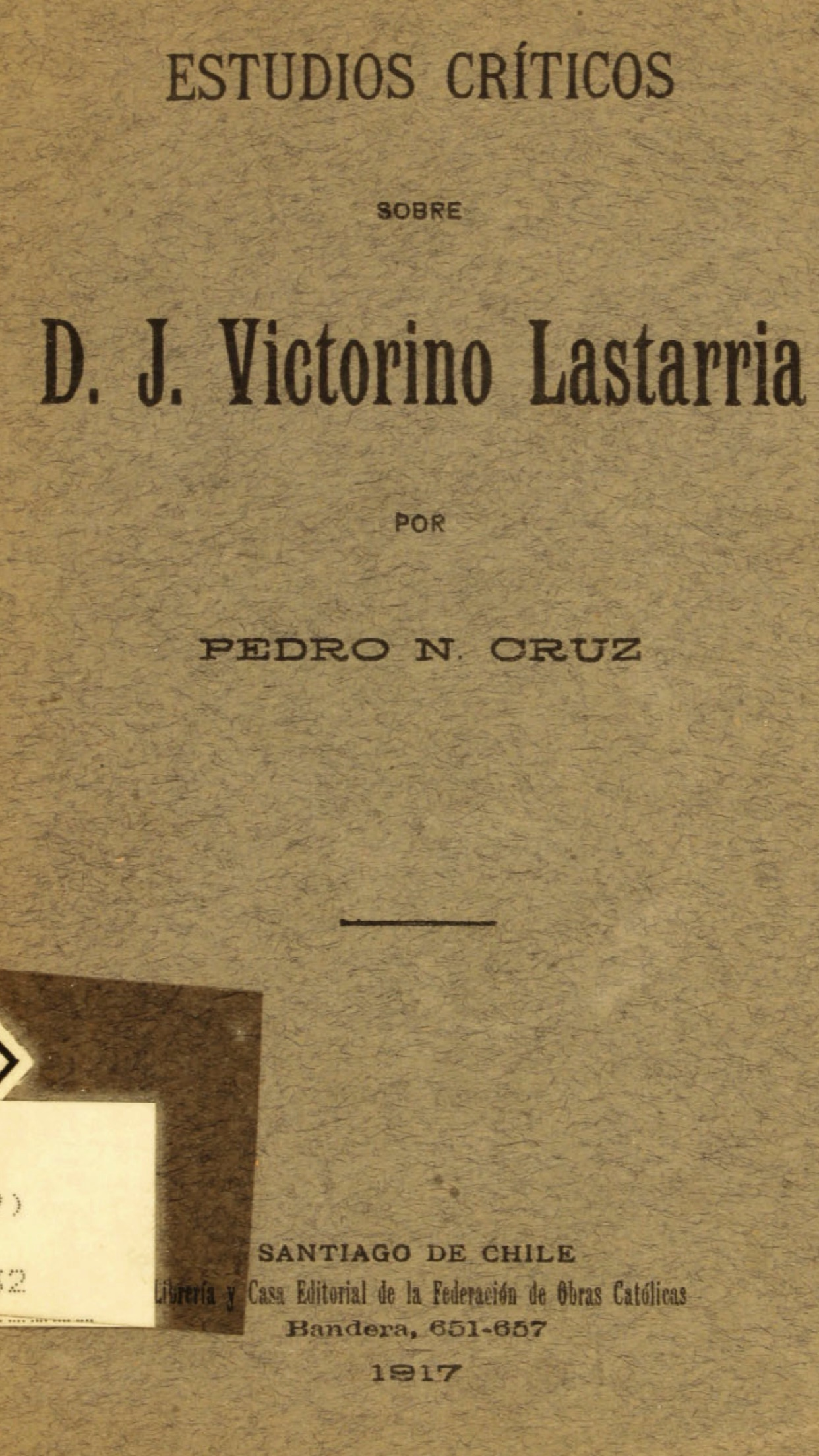
Estudios Críticos sobre José Victorino Lastarria, 1917.

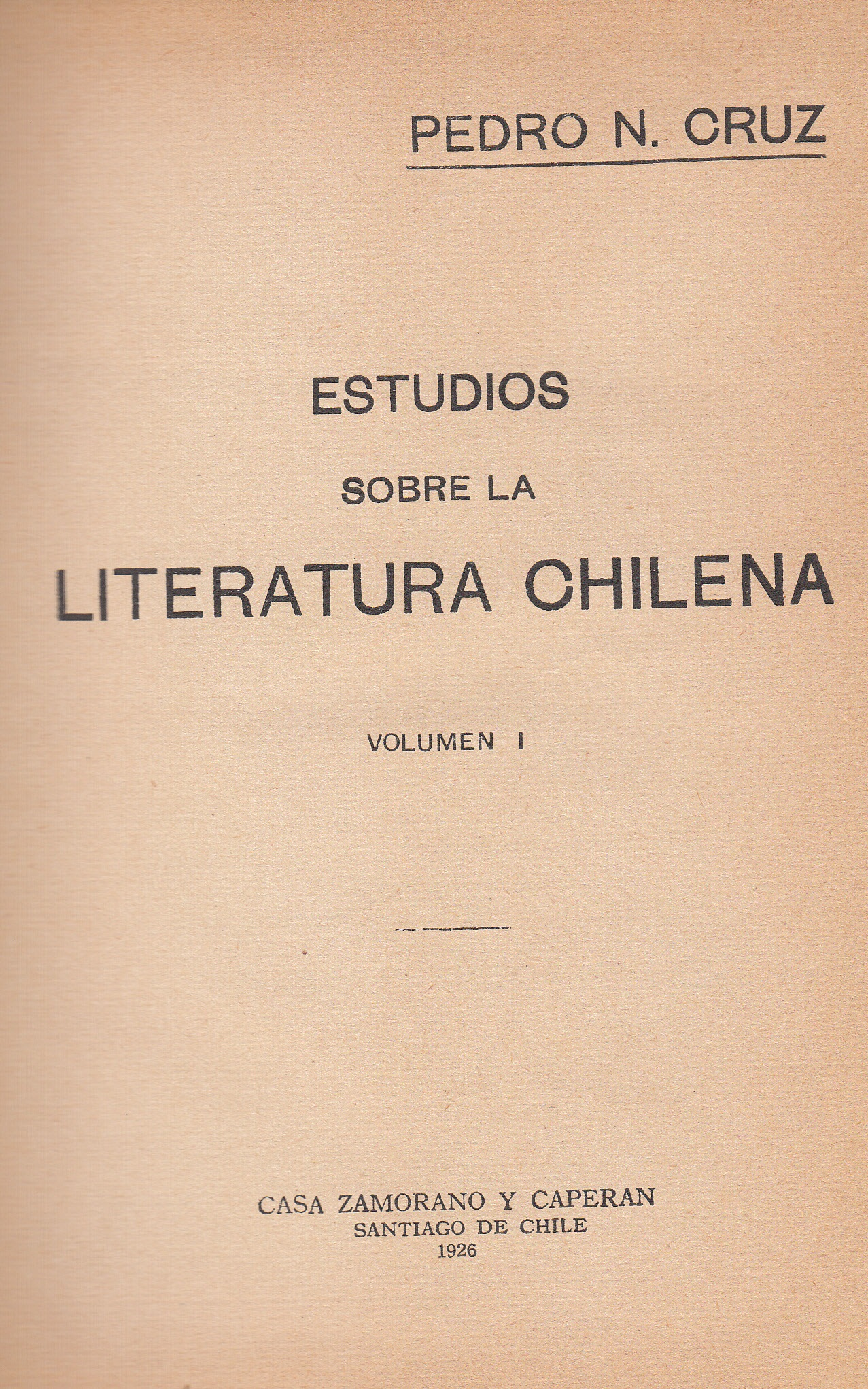
Estudios sobre la Literatura Chilena, 1926.

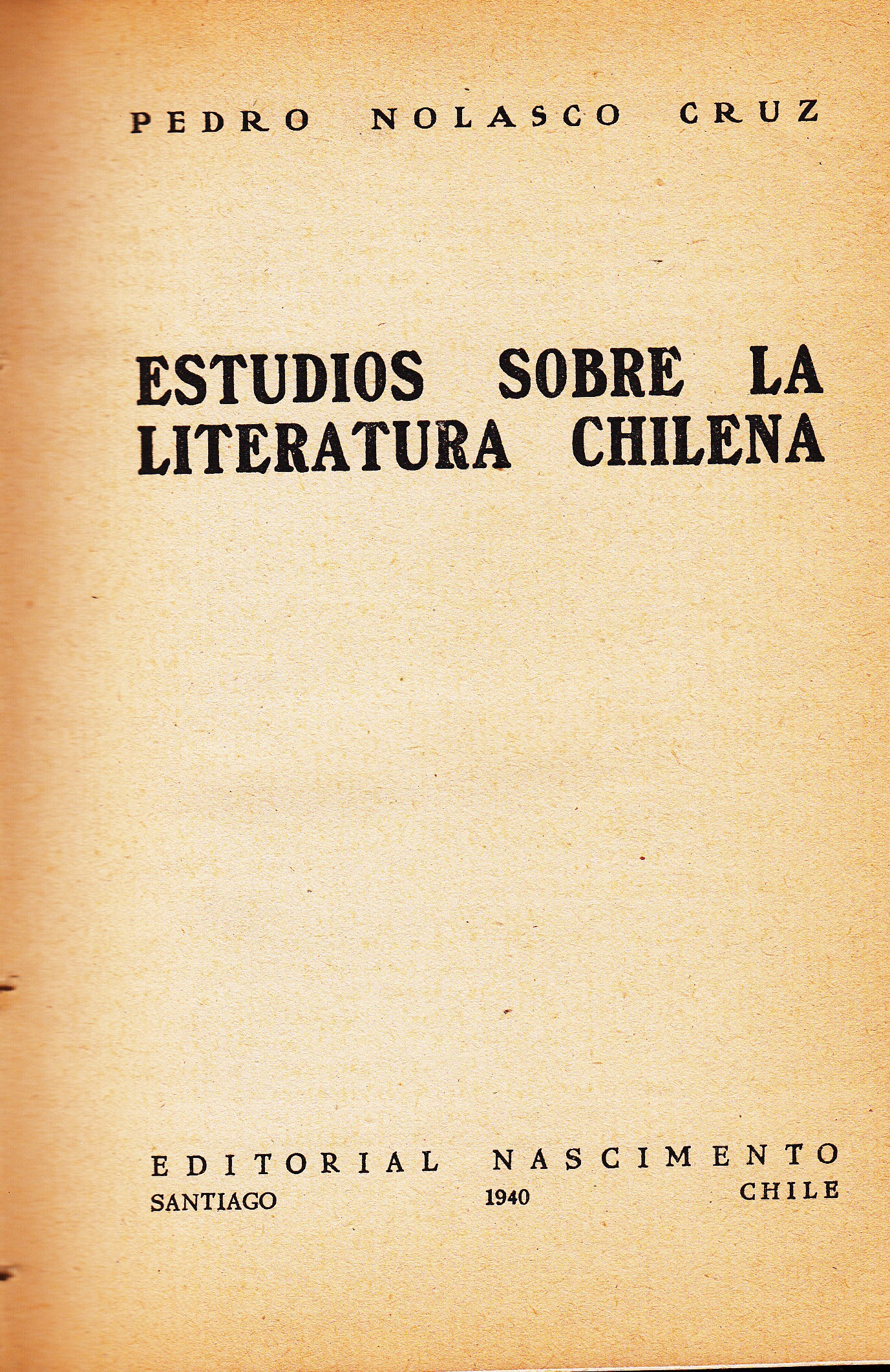
Estudios sobre la Literatura Chilena, 1940.
