= Carlos Walker Martínez =

Chilean lawyer and politician (1842–1905)

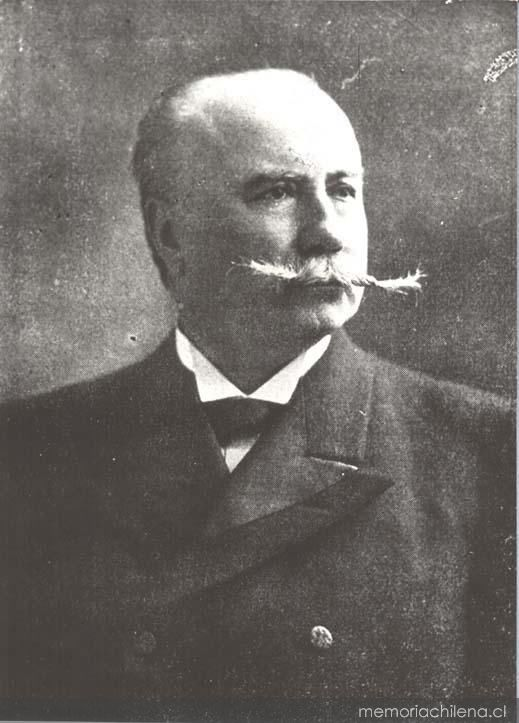

Minister of the Interior
- In office 14 April 1898 – 27 June 1899
- President: Federico Errázuriz Echaurren
- Preceded by: Antonio Valdés
- Succeeded by: Raimundo Silva

Member of the Senate
- In office 4 June 1894 – 5 October 1905
- Constituency: Santiago

Member of the Chamber of Deputies
- In office 1891–1894
- Constituency: Rancagua, Cachapoal and Maipo
- In office 1885–1891
- Constituency: Maipo
- In office 1879–1882
- Constituency: Santiago
- In office 1870–1876
- Constituency: Vallenar

Personal details
- Born: 1 December 1842 Vallenar, Chile
- Died: 5 October 1905 (aged 62) Santiago, Chile
- Party: Conservative Party
- Spouse: Sofía Linares Frías
- Children: 8
- Parent(s): Juan Ashley Walker; Mercedes Martínez Soria
- Education: University of Chile (LL.B)
- Profession: Lawyer

Carlos Walker Martínez (1 December 1842 – 5 October 1905) was a Chilean lawyer, writer and Conservative politician who served as a member of the Chamber of Deputies of Chile, as a senator for Santiago, and as Minister of the Interior under President Federico Errázuriz Echaurren.

== Early life ==
Walker was born in Vallenar, Chile, on 1 December 1842 to Juan Ashley Walker Martínez and Mercedes Martínez Soria. Following the death of his father, he moved with his mother to Copiapó, where he studied at the Colegio de los Sagrados Corazones. He later attended Colegio San Ignacio from 1856 to 1861.

In 1862, Walker entered the Faculty of Law of the University of Chile. He qualified as a lawyer on 26 November 1866.

He married Sofía Linares Frías, with whom he had eight children.

As a lawyer, Walker participated in major litigation and mining negotiations. He later became president of the Compañía Boratera de Ascotán.

== Political career ==
Walker began his political career in the Conservative Party, of which he later became a prominent figure and president in 1901.

In 1866, during the war against Spain, he served as secretary of the Chilean naval squadron. The following year, he was sent to Bolivia as secretary of the Chilean legation. After returning to Chile, he was appointed a section chief in the Ministry of the Interior in 1869.

Walker entered the Chamber of Deputies in 1870 as deputy for Vallenar for the 1870–1873 parliamentary period. He served as provisional secretary of the Chamber from 29 May to 2 June 1870 and subsequently as its secretary until 29 May 1873. He also participated in the Constituent Congress of 1870.

He was reelected deputy for Vallenar for the 1873–1876 term. After being appointed Chilean chargé d'affaires in Bolivia, however, he left the country and was replaced in the Chamber by substitute deputy Luis Téllez Ossa. While serving in Bolivia, Walker signed an agreement concerning Chilean–Bolivian relations on 5 August 1874.

Walker returned to Congress as deputy for Santiago for the 1879–1882 parliamentary period. He served on the permanent committee for constitution, legislation and justice and was a member of the Conservative Commission during the 1879–1880 recess.

In 1885, he was elected deputy for Maipo for the 1885–1888 term and was reelected for the same constituency for 1888–1891. During both terms, he continued to serve on the permanent committee for constitution, legislation and justice and participated in several Conservative Commissions.

Walker was an opponent of President José Manuel Balmaceda during the political crisis that culminated in the 1891 Chilean Civil War. According to his parliamentary biography, he led the Revolutionary Committee in Santiago and was associated with plans to disrupt government communications and infrastructure. The planned destruction of the bridge over the Maipo River was connected with the group gathered at his Lo Cañas estate; the discovery of the plan preceded the episode known as the Lo Cañas massacre. Walker also signed the declaration calling for Balmaceda's removal in 1891.

Following the Civil War, Walker was elected deputy for Rancagua, Cachapoal and Maipo for the 1891–1894 parliamentary period. He continued to serve on the permanent committee for constitution, legislation and justice.

On 4 June 1894, Walker took office as senator for Santiago for a three-year term ending in 1897. He was reelected for the 1897–1903 term and remained in the Senate for the 1903–1909 parliamentary period. Throughout much of his senatorial career, he served on the permanent committee for constitution, legislation and justice. He died before completing his final term.

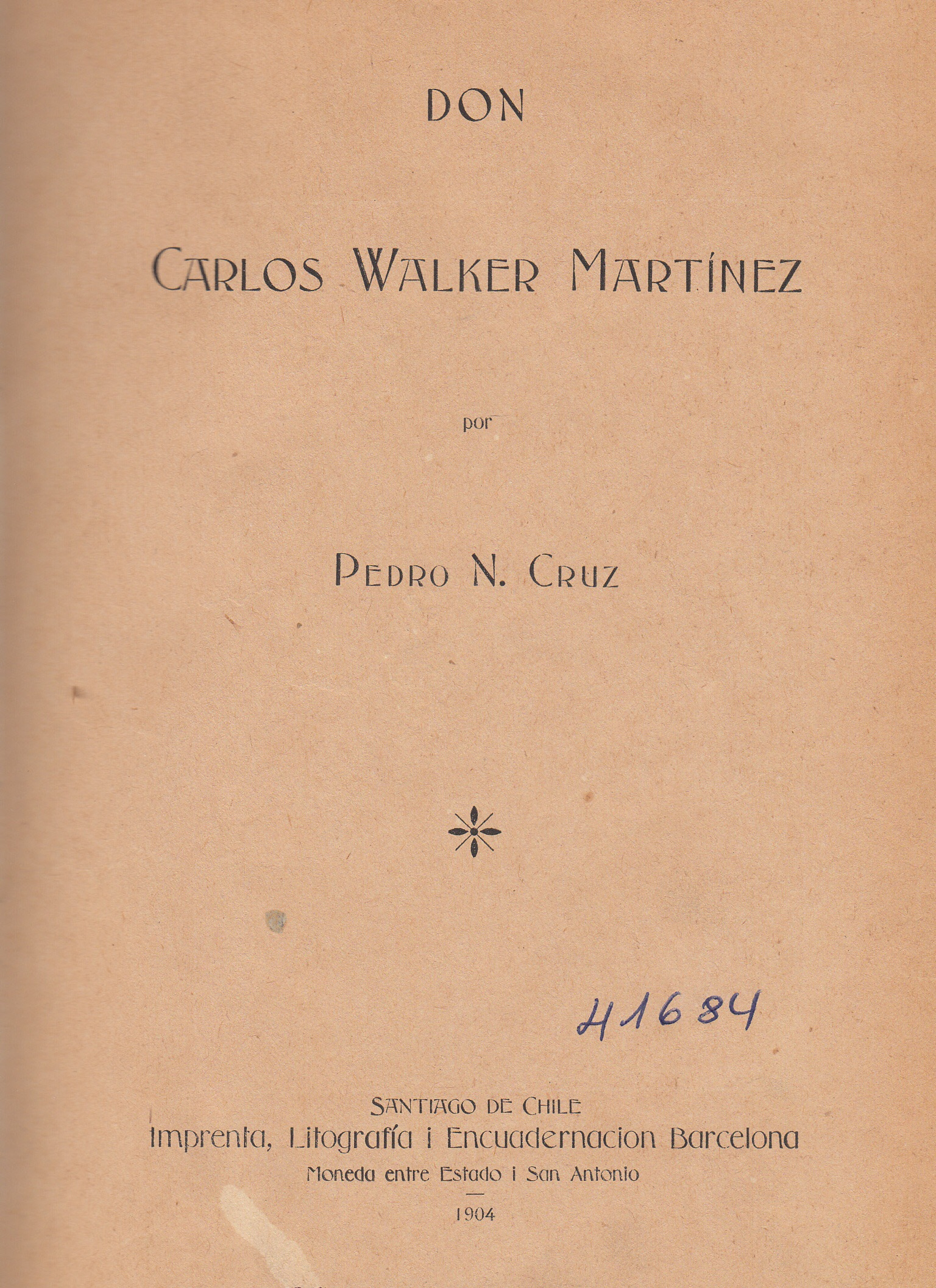
Bibliographic book of Carlos Walker Martinez (1904) Written by Pedro Cruz Vergara.

During the presidency of Federico Errázuriz Echaurren, Walker served as Minister of the Interior from 14 April 1898 to 27 June 1899. He simultaneously served as acting Minister of Finance from 18 to 28 June 1898.

In 1901, Walker served as president of the Conservative Party and organized the party's convention that year.

== Writing and other activities ==
Walker published poetry in Santiago newspapers and periodicals, including República Literaria. He also wrote historical studies, including works on José María Linares, Diego Portales and the administration of President Domingo Santa María.

In 1879, Walker became president of the Círculo Católico. During the War of the Pacific, he also participated in charitable activities for victims of the conflict and founded a Red Cross organization in Santiago in 1879.

Walker died in Santiago on 5 October 1905 while serving as senator for Santiago.
