= Saint Ignatius College =

Saint Ignatius College or St. Ignatius of Loyola College may refer to:

== Australia ==
- Saint Ignatius' College, Riverview, New South Wales
- Saint Ignatius' College, Adelaide, South Australia
- Saint Ignatius College, Geelong, Victoria

== Bolivia ==
- St Ignatius College, La Paz

== Brazil ==
- St. Ignatius College, Fortaleza
- St. Ignatius College, Rio de Janeiro

== Canada ==
- St. Ignatius of Loyola Church (Montreal)

== Chile ==
- St. Ignatius College, Santiago

== Colombia ==
- St. Ignatius Loyola College, Medellín

== East Timor ==
- St. Ignatius of Loyola College, East Timor

== Hungary ==
- Saint Ignatius Jesuit College of Excellence, Budapest

== Ireland ==
- Coláiste Iognáid (St. Ignatius College), Galway

== Italy ==
- St. Ignatius College, Messina

== Malta ==
- St Ignatius College, in Villa St Ignatius, St. Julian's (closed 1907)

== Netherlands ==
- Ignatius Gymnasium, Amsterdam, North Holland

== New Zealand ==
- St Ignatius of Loyola Catholic College, Drury

== Spain ==
- St. Ignatius College, Barcelona
- St. Ignatius of Loyola College, Las Palmas
- St. Ignatius of Loyola College, Alcala de Henares, Madrid
- St. Ignatius College, Oviedo
- St. Ignatius College, Pamplona
- St. Ignatius College, San Sebastian

== United Kingdom ==
- St Ignatius College, Enfield, London, England

== United States ==
- St. Ignatius College, former name of the University of San Francisco, California
- St. Ignatius College Preparatory, San Francisco, California
- St. Ignatius College Prep, Chicago, Illinois
- St. Ignatius College, former name of John Carroll University, University Heights, Ohio

== Venezuela ==
- St. Ignatius of Loyola College, Caracas

== Zimbabwe ==
- St. Ignatius College (Zimbabwe), Chishawasha, Mashonaland

== See also ==
- Colegio San Ignacio (disambiguation)
- Saint Ignatius University Centre, Antwerp, Belgium
- St. Ignatius Catholic School (disambiguation)
- St. Ignatius High School (disambiguation)
- St. Ignatius (disambiguation)
