= St. Ignatius of Loyola College =

St. Ignatius of Loyola College may refer to the following schools:

- St. Ignatius of Loyola College, Alcala de Henares, Madrid, Spain
- St. Ignatius of Loyola College, Caracas, Venezuela
- St. Ignatius of Loyola College, Las Palmas, Canary Islands, Spain
- St. Ignatius of Loyola College, Timor-Leste
- St Ignatius of Loyola Catholic College, Auckland, New Zealand
- St. Ignatius Loyola College, Medellín, Colombia
- St. Ignatius of Loyola Catholic Secondary School, Oakville, Ontario, Canada
