= Colegio San Ignacio =

Colegio San Ignacio may refer to:

- Colegio San Ignacio de Loyola (San Juan), Puerto Rico
- Colegio San Ignacio, Santiago, Chile
- Colegio San Ignacio, Machalí, Chile
- Colegio San Ignacio, Medellín, Colombia
- Colegio San Ignacio de Loyola, Caracas, Venezuela

== See also ==
- Saint Ignatius College (disambiguation)
