= St. Ignatius Church =

St. Ignatius Church may refer to:

== Argentina ==
- St. Ignatius Church (Buenos Aires)

== Australia ==
- St Ignatius' Church, Norwood
- St Ignatius' Church, Richmond
- St Ignatius Loyola Church, Toowong
- St Ignatius Roman Catholic Church and Convent, Bourke

== Austria ==
- Old Cathedral, Linz, also called the Church of Ignatius

== Canada ==
- St. Ignatius Church, Montreal, Quebec
- St Ignatius Church, Winnipeg

== Cayman Islands ==
- St. Ignatius Church, George Town

== Chile ==
- Church of Saint Ignatius (Santiago de Chile)
- Church of Saint Ignatius, Empedrado

== Colombia ==
- Church of Saint Ignatius, Bogotá
- Church of Saint Ignatius, Medellín

== Czech Republic ==
- St. Ignatius Church, Prague

== France ==
- St. Ignatius Church, Paris
- St. Ignatius Church, Strasbourg

== Germany ==
- St. Ignatius Church, Betzdorf
- St. Ignatius Church, Südviertel
- St. Ignatius Church, Frankfurt am Main
- St. Ignatius Church, Landshut
- St. Ignatius Church, Mainz
- St. Ignatius Church, Munich
- St. Ignatius Church, Regensburg
- Church of St. Ignatius of Loyola, Schweineberg
- St. Ignatius Church, Türkismühle

== India ==
- St Ignatius Church, Thiruvananthapuram, Kerala, India

== Ireland ==
- St Ignatius Church, Galway, Ireland

== Italy ==
- Sant'Ignazio Church, Rome
- St. Ignatius Church, Gorizia
- Church of St. Ignatius of Loyola, Oliena
- Sant'Ignazio all'Olivella
- Church of St. Ignatius of Antioch, Rome

== Japan ==
- St. Ignatius Church, Tokyo (聖イグナチオ教会)

== Philippines ==
- San Ignacio Church (Intramuros)

== Serbia ==
- Church of St. Ignatius of Antioch, Malo Crniće

== Singapore ==
- Catholic Church of St. Ignatius, Singapore, a Catholic church located at King's Road

== Slovenia ==
- St. Ignatius of Loyola Church, Rdeči Breg, Podvelka

== Spain ==
- Church of Saint Ignatius of Loyola, San Sebastián

== United Kingdom ==
- St. Ignatius Church, Preston, Lancashire
- St. Ignatius Church, Stamford Hill, London
- St. Ignatius Church, Wishaw, Scotland

== United States ==
- Saint Ignatius Church (San Francisco), California
- St. Ignatius Loyola Church (Denver, Colorado)
- Saint Ignatius Church, Baltimore, Maryland
- St. Ignatius Church (Forest Hill, Maryland), listed on the National Register of Historic Places in Harford County, Maryland
- St. Ignatius Church (Oxon Hill, Maryland), listed on the National Register of Historic Places in Prince George's County, Maryland
- St. Ignatius Church (Port Tobacco Village, Maryland)
- St. Ignatius Roman Catholic Church (St. Inigoes, Maryland)
- Saint Ignatius Loyola Church, Houghton, Michigan
- Saint Ignatius Church and Cemetery, Readmond Township, Michigan
- San Ignacio Church, Albuquerque, New Mexico
- Church of St. Ignatius Loyola (New York City)
- St. Ignatius of Antioch Church (New York City)

== See also ==
- St. Ignatius Mission, St. Ignatius, Montana
- Cathedral of St. Ignatius of Loyola (disambiguation)
- St. Ignatius (disambiguation)
