= Colegio Mayor de San Bartolomé =

School in Bogotá, Cundinamarca, Colombia

Major College of Saint Bartholomew
- Spanish: Colegio Mayor de San Bartolomé
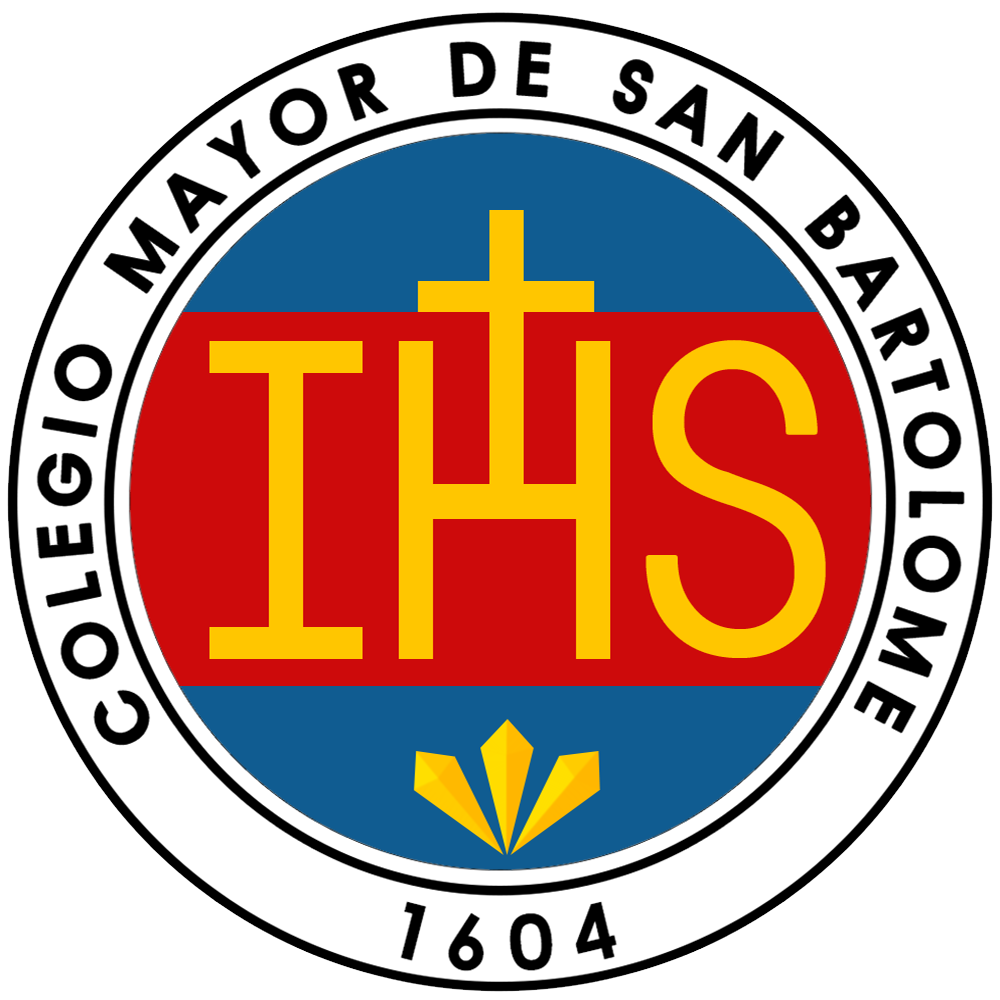

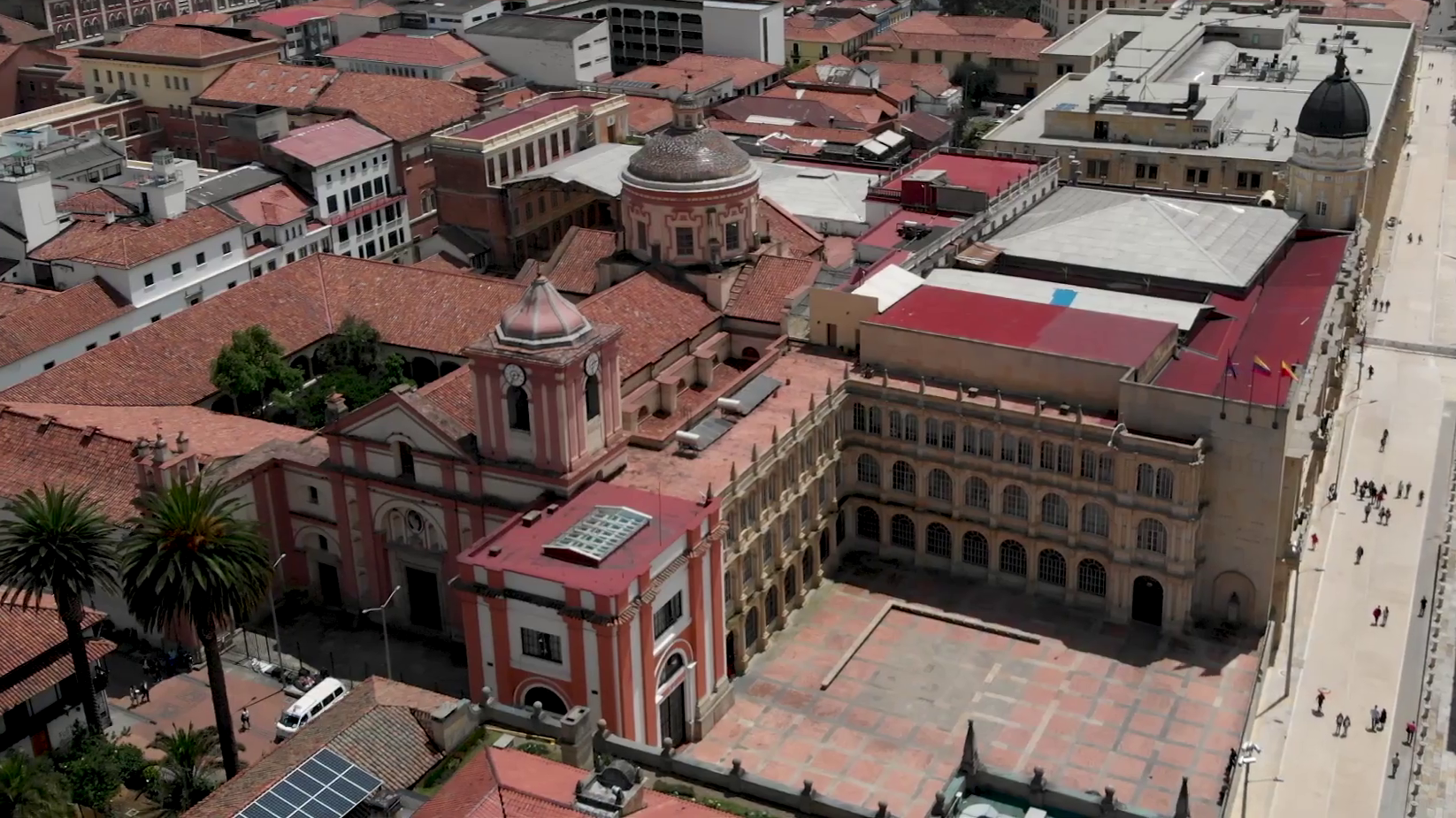
- Colegio Mayor de San Bartolomé, Plaza de Bolívar

Location
- 96 Plaza de Bolívar; Bogotá, Cundinamarca; Colombia
- 4°35′49.13″N 74°4′32.75″W

Information
- Other name: National College of St. Bartholomew; College of St. Bartholomew; College of the Society of Jesus
- Motto: Where there is a Bartolino there is a gentleman, where there is a Bartolina there is a Lady
- Religious affiliation: Catholicism
- Denomination: Jesuit
- Patron saint: Bartolomé Lobo Guerrero
- Established: 1604; 422 years ago
- Rector: Juan Pablo González Escobar SJ
- Grades: Pre-K–12
- Gender: Co-educational (since 1998)
- Enrollment: 1,500
- Nickname: El Mayor
- Affiliation: Federación Latinoamericana de Colegios Jesuitas
- Website: www.sanbartolome.edu.co

Colegio Mayor de San Bartolomé is a private Catholic pre-school, primary, secondary school, and college-preparatory school, colonial of Plateresque style building, located in the Santa Fe district of Bogotá, Cundinamarca, Colombia. The co-educational school was founded on 27 September 1604 by the Archbishop of Bogotá Bartolomé Lobo Guerrero and the Jesuits José Dadey, Martín de Funes, Juan Bautista Coluccini, Martín de Torres, Bernabé de Rojas, and Diego Sánchez. The school is managed by the Society of Jesus.

Sometimes called the National College of Saint Bartholomew, the College of Saint Bartholomew, and the College of the Society of Jesus, the school is the oldest Colombian school in continuous operation, with a 400-year history since its founding in 1604. The Pontifical Xaverian University in the colony grew out of it in 1623. At St. Bartholomew, in 1826, the Central University of the Republic was founded, predecessor of the National University of Colombia, which brought together the National Library of Colombia, the College of San Bartolomé, and the university itself. It has been administered sometimes by the State and sometimes by the Jesuits, in whose hands it is today.

Colegio Mayor de San Bartolomé, throughout its long history has made significant contribution to Colombian society, particularly during the independence process. Many of its students and alumni played key roles in the struggle for emancipation. Twenty eight presidents of Colombia have graduated from the school, among other figures of national importance. In 2016 the school had approximately 1500 students.

Its baccalaureate building is a cultural and national monument by Decree 1584 of 11 August 1975, and is located diagonally across from the southeast corner of Plaza de Bolívar in Bogotá. This building along with the Church of St.Ignatius and the Museum of Colonial Art in Bogotá are part of the Jesuit block, which has been under restoration by the Society of Jesus and the Colombian Ministry of Culture.

== History ==
=== 1604-1766 ===
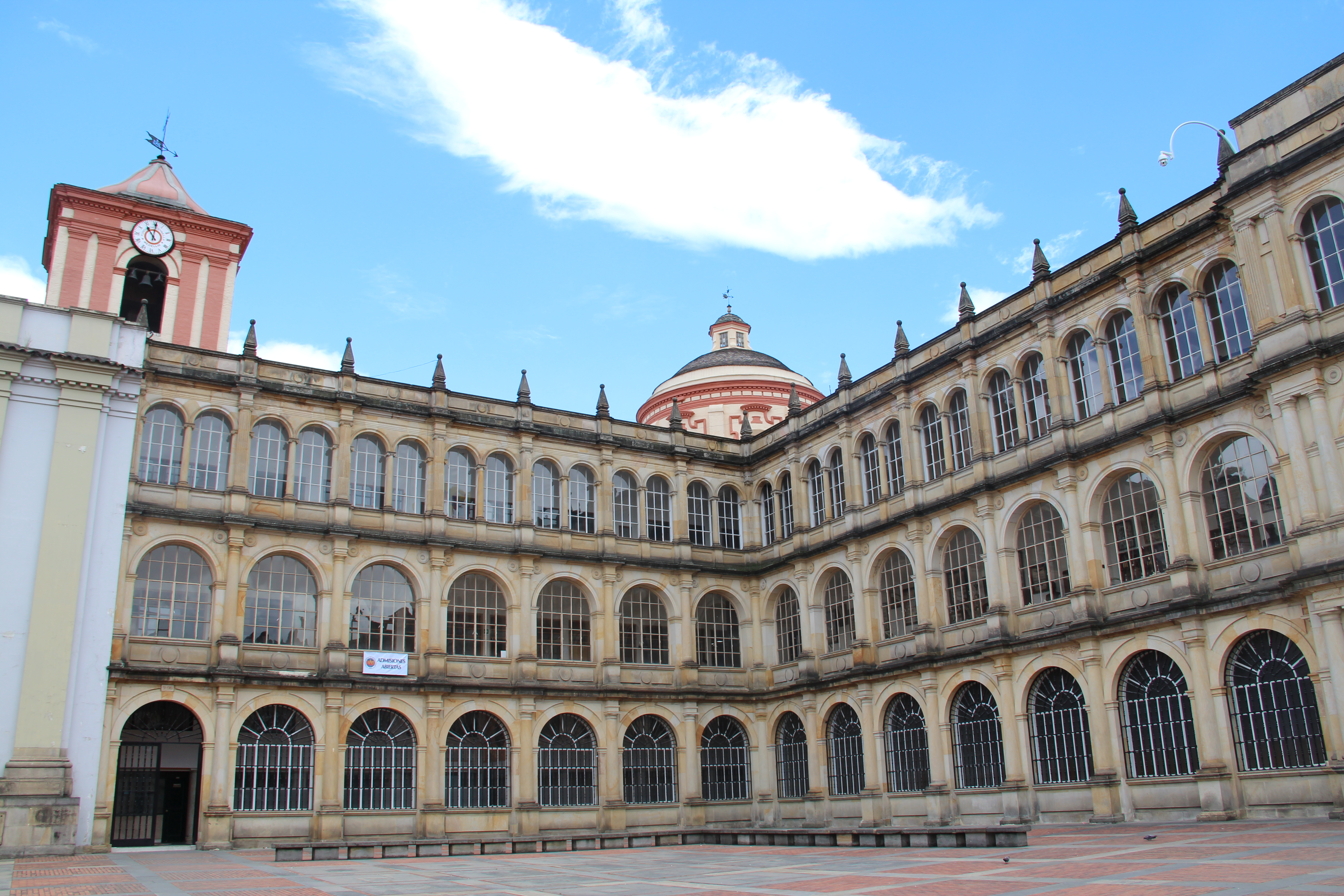
Main facade, tower and cupola.

On 23 September 1604 six Jesuits came to Santa Fe from Cartagena to found the College of the Society of Jesus with support from the Archbishop of Bogotá Don Bartolomé Lobo Guerrero.

The school was established on 27 September 1604 with a royal document authorizing its foundation. It opened on 1 January 1605 with 70 students.

The educational institution, although it was originally called the College of the Society of Jesus in Santa Fe, today is called the St. Bartholomew Major College, a name inherited from the seminary of the city re-founded by the Archbishop Don Bartolomé Lobo Guerrero on 18 October 1605 and located in what is now the Palacio de San Carlos. This seminary was run by the Jesuits. The seminarians and the borders both took their classes in the College of the Society of Jesus in Santa Fé, and called it the School and Seminary of St. Bartholomew.

By a bull of Gregory XV and by a royal document from Felipe IV issued in 1622, the College established itself as Xaverian University. Classrooms were in the current Museum of Colonial Art, which was part of the school building.

In 1704 the College which competed with the Rosary College took the name Royal Major College and Seminary of St. Bartholomew.

The Jesuits of St. Bartholomew brought the first printing press to Colombia.

=== 1767-1886 ===
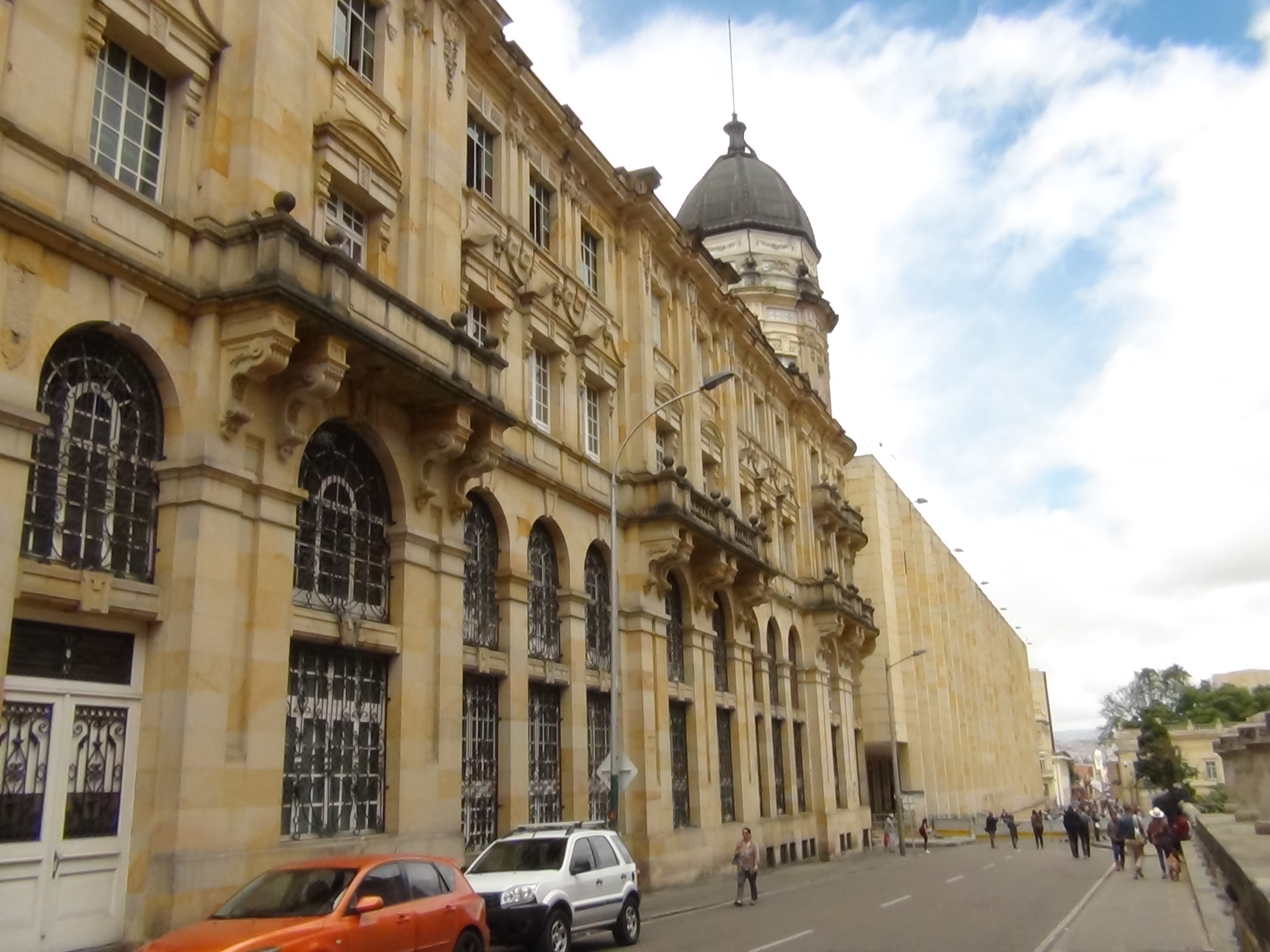
7th street side

The year 1767 saw the expulsion of the Jesuits by the pragmatic sanction of Carlos III, and St. Bartholomew passed into the hands of the government. The library of the college became a founding part of the National Library of Colombia.

By order of the Junta Virreinal de Temporalidades in 1772 the Seminary College was moved to the College of St. Bartholomew and Xaverian University, and it assumed all the educational functions. In 1823, the State handed over to the Archdiocese the old convent of the Capuchins and chapel of San José for use of the Conciliar Seminary. Since 1826 the university studies continuing there assumed the name First District University or Central University, now the National University of Colombia, inaugurated on 25 December 1826 in a ceremony at the church of St. Ignatius of the College of St. Bartholomew.

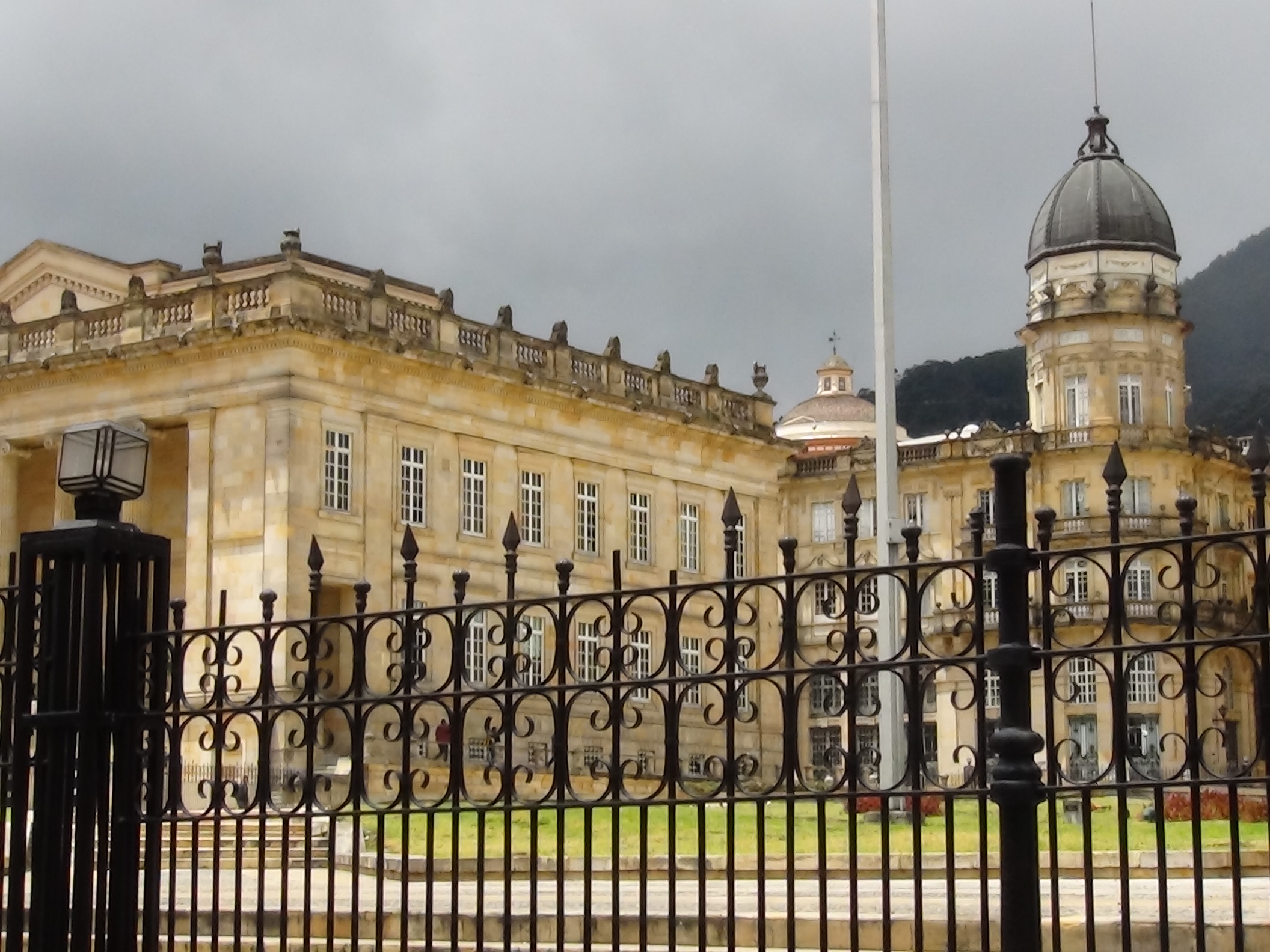
Torreón de la Bandera tower

In 1842, the university and the college, together with the museum and the national library, were under the government control and directed by a single superior, who was rector of the University and of the College of St. Bartholomew.

By 1844, under President Pedro Alcantara Herran, the Jesuits returned and took charge of the Seminary. But six years later, on 18 May 1850, they received a decree of expulsion from Jose Hilario Lopez and left Santa Marta. In 1857 under the government of President Mariano Ospina Rodriguez the Jesuits returned and on 8 January 1859 took charge of the College of St. Bartholomew.

Two and a half years later, on 26 July 1861, Tomás Cipriano de Mosquera returned and decreed the banishment of the Jesuits; the school became a public school. By 1865, its administration was given to the Cundinamarca Department and in 1866 nationalized. By 1882, under Rafael Núñez's presidency, the Jesuits returned to Panama and to Pasto, Colombia.

=== 1887 to 1928 ===
In 1887 the Company of Jesus returned to Bogotá and the National School of St. Bartholomew was again put under their direction. In 1891 the first baccalaureate took place. In the year 1902, President Jose Manuel Marroquín and Archbishop Bernardo Herrera Restrepo, officially consecrated the nation to the Sacred Heart of Jesus on June 22.

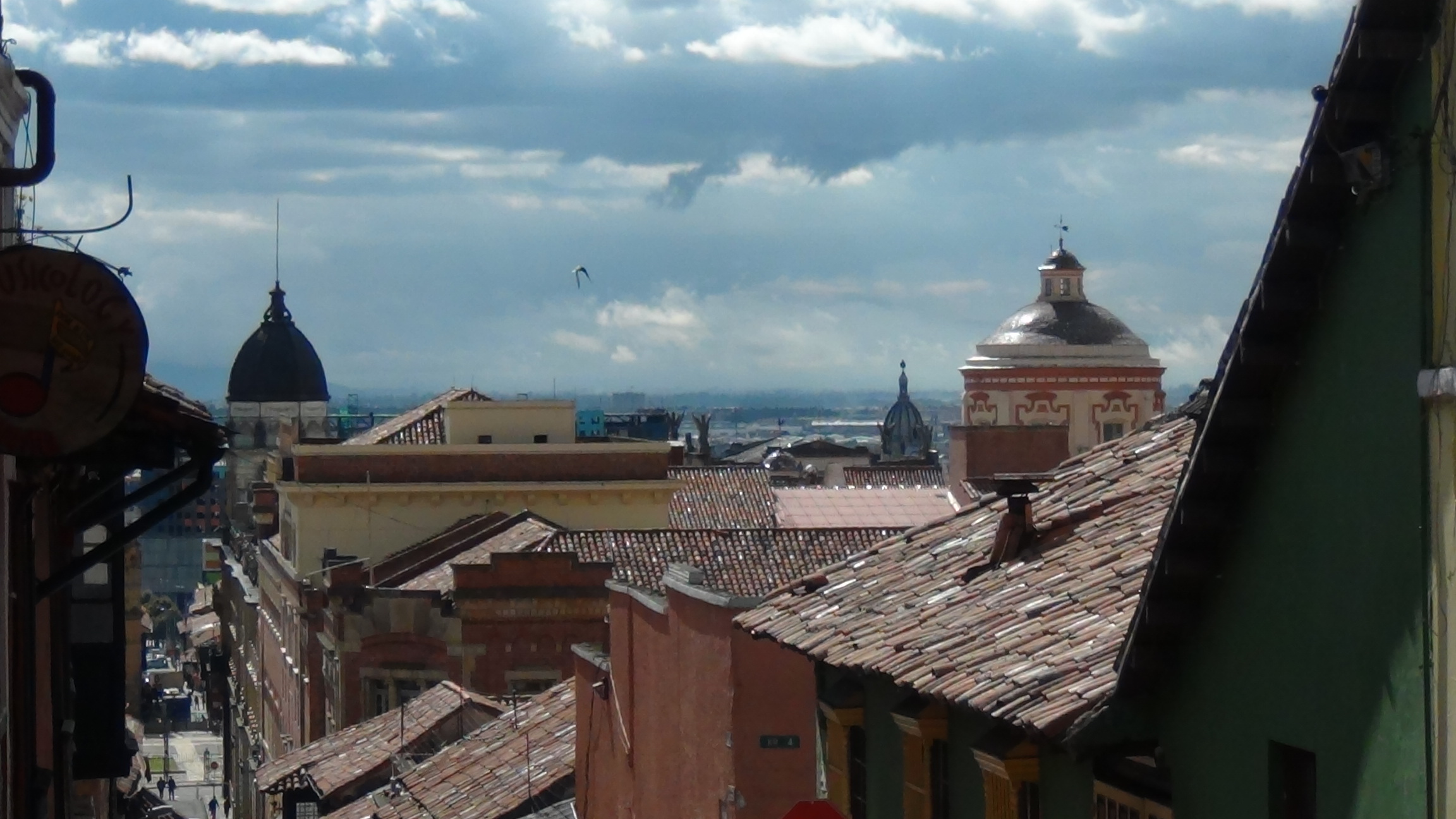
School flag tower and cupola of St. Ignatius church seen from La Candelaria neighborhood

=== 1928 to 1941 ===
In 1928 the National Congress recognized the autonomy of the College by Law 44. It ceded the use of the building that was considered national property and it became a private school with the name of Colegio San Bartolomé. In 1930 Xaverian University was reestablished in the College. In 1937, the National Congress by Law 110 claimed the building, forcing the Jesuits to construct a new building on the grounds of La Merced while appealing to the Supreme Court on ownership of the building.

In 1937 the high school students formed a football team that in 1946 became the current Millonarios Fútbol Club, the squad with the second most professional football titles in the country.

=== 1941 to 1952 ===
With the possibility of expropriation of the school building, the Jesuits built a new one on La Merced farm. They continued the College under the name of St. Bartholomew La Merced College, without renouncing the rights they had on the Colegio de San Bartolomé on Plaza de Bolívar. Construction was subsidized by the sale of part of the farm land, for a neighbourhood in La Merced. In 1941 classes began in the new school, and the old building was appropriated by the nation and run as a public school with the name of Colegio Nacional de San Bartolomé.

On 10 January 1951, Laureano Gomez, president and graduate of St. Bartholomew secondary school, returned the national school to the Jesuits with a five-year contract, by which they undertook to educate free 900 day pupils and 200 workers in night school. The government paid $25,000 pesos a month and ceded the building.

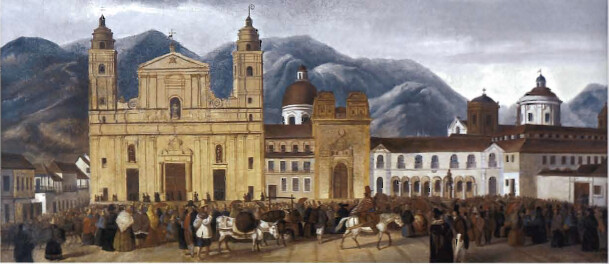
Plaza de Bolívar (and the Colegio de San Bartolomé to the right) in 1840 by José Santos Figueroa

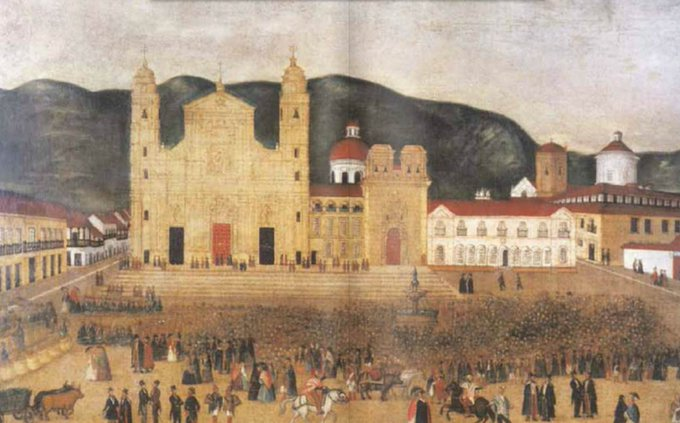
Plaza de Bolívar in 1844, oil by Santiago Castillo Escallón. The Colegio Mayor de San Bartolomé is pictured at far right.

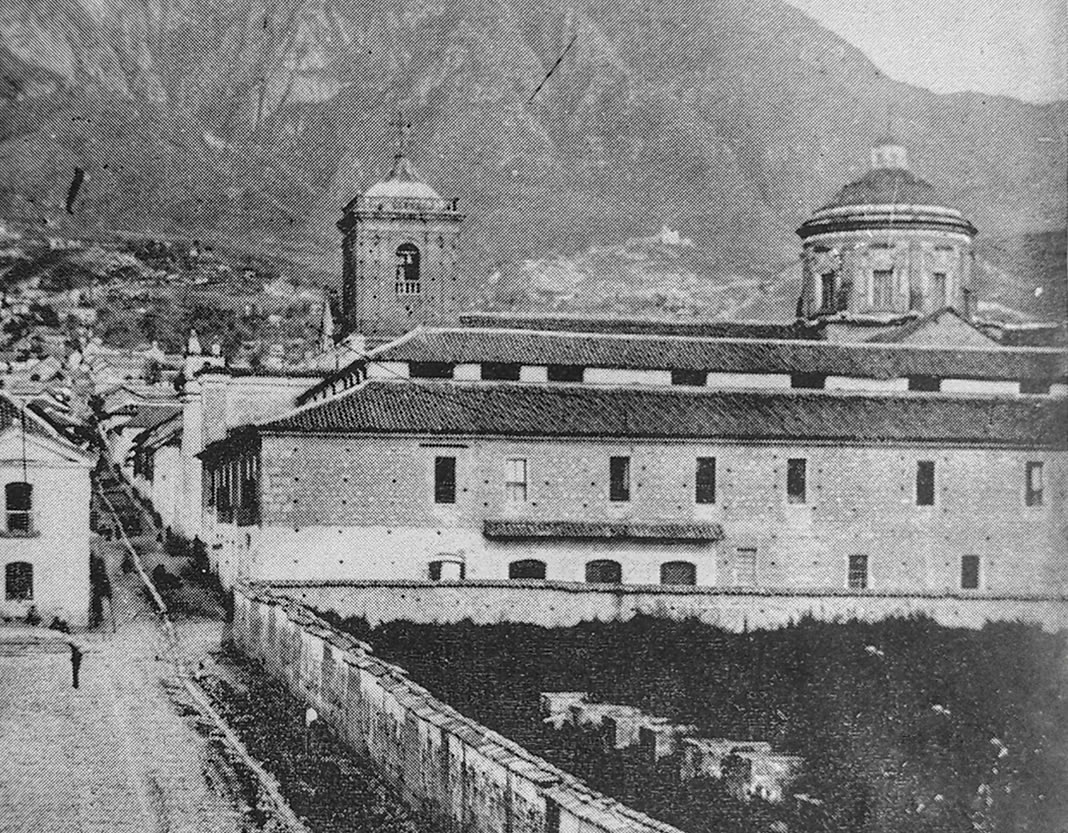
The Colegio Mayor de San Bartolomé in 1868

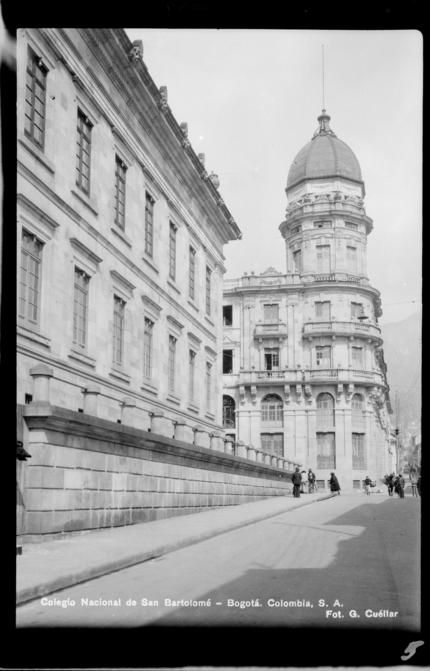
Torreón de la Bandera in 1894, photographed by G. Cuéllar

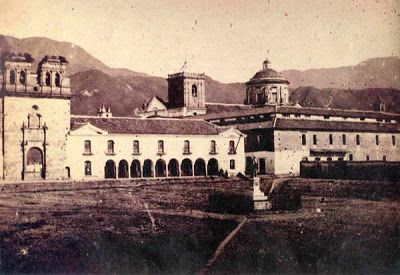
Colegio Mayor de San Bartolomé in 1896.

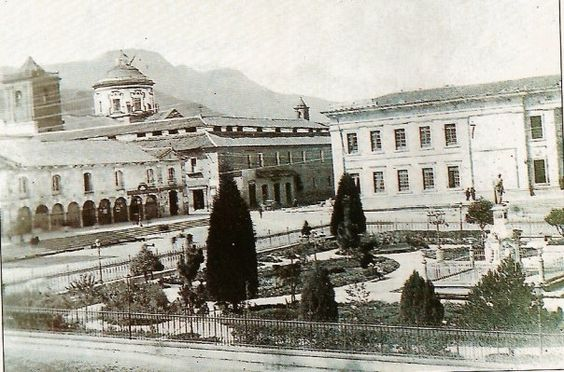
Colegio Mayor de San Bartolomé in 1933.

== Notable alumni ==
- Indalecio Liévano Aguirre
- Luis Carlos Sarmiento Angulo
- Julio Garavito Armero
- Justo Arosemena
- García de Medrano y Álvarez de los Ríos
- García de Medrano y Mendizábal
- Ricardo Acevedo Bernal
- Nemesio Camacho
- Jaime Castro Castro
- Rufino José Cuervo
- Laureano Gómez
- Álvaro Gómez Hurtado
- Carlos Holguín Mallarino
- Manuel María Mallarino
- José Manuel Marroquín
- Antonio Nariño
- Misael Pastrana
- Jose Miguel Pey
- Antonio Ricaurte
- Custodio García Rovira
- Miguel Samper
- Francisco de Paula Santander
- Hernando Tovar
- Rafael Urdaneta

== See also ==
- List of buildings in Bogotá
- Education in Colombia
- History of Bogotá
- List of schools in Colombia
- List of Jesuit schools
