= Loyola University =

Loyola University is one of several Jesuit Universities named for St. Ignatius of Loyola.

Loyola University may refer to:

== Democratic Republic of the Congo ==
- Loyola University of Congo, Kinshasa, Congo

== Spain ==
- Loyola University Andalusia, Sevilla

== United States ==
- Loyola Marymount University, Los Angeles, California
  - Loyola Marymount Lions, the school's athletic program
  - Loyola Law School
- Loyola University Chicago, Illinois
  - Loyola Ramblers, the school's athletic program
  - Loyola University Chicago School of Law
  - Loyola University Medical Center
- Loyola University Maryland (Baltimore)
  - Loyola Greyhounds, the school's athletic program
- Loyola University New Orleans, Louisiana
  - Loyola Wolf Pack, the school's athletic program
  - Loyola University New Orleans College of Law

== See also ==
- Loyola (disambiguation)
- List of Jesuit Educational Institutions
