= List of schools in Colombia =

An incomplete list of schools in Colombia:

- Colegio Bolivar, Cali
- Colegio Albania, Albania
- Colegio Cristiano El-Shaddai, Barranquilla
- Colegio Jorge Washington, Cartagena
- Colegio Karl C. Parrish, Barranquilla
- Colegio Lacordaire, Cali
- Colegio San Pedro Claver, Bucaramanga
- Colegio Técnico Comercial Santa María Goretty, Cali
- Corporación Educativa American School, Barranquilla
- Escuela de Arte Eladio Vélez, Itagüí
- German School of Barranquilla, Barranquilla
- Gimnasio Los Caobos, Chía
- Lycée Français de Medellin, Envigado
- Lycée Français Paul Valéry de Cali, Yumbo
- Marymount International School Barranquilla, Puerto Colombia
- St. Aloysius Gonzaga College, Manizales
- St. Francis Xavier College, San Juan de Pasto
- St. Ignatius Loyola College, Medellín
- St. Joseph College, Barranquilla

== See also ==
- List of Normal Schools by Country
