= Loyola =

Loyola may refer to:

== People ==
- St. Ignatius of Loyola
- Loyola (surname)
- Etsowish-simmegee-itshin, indigenous man whose baptismal name was Loyola

== Places ==
- Loyola (CTA), a station on the Chicago Transit Authority's 'L' system, in Chicago, Illinois, US
- Loyola (Montreal), a district of Côte-des-Neiges–Notre-Dame-de-Grâce, Montreal, Quebec, Canada
- Loyola, California, an unincorporated town in Santa Clara County, California, US
- Loyola, San Sebastián, a neighborhood in San Sebastián, Guipúzcoa, Spain
- Sanctuary of Loyola, Azpeitia, Guipúzcoa, Spain

== Education ==
=== Secondary schools ===
==== Asia & Oceania ====
===== India =====
- Loyola High School (Goa), Margao
- Loyola High School, Patna, Bihar
- Loyola High School, Hindupur
- Loyola High School, Karimnagar
- Loyola High School, KD Peta
- Loyola High School, Vinukonda
- Loyola Higher Secondary School, Kuppayanallur
- Loyola Public School, Nallapadu, Andhra Pradesh
- Loyola School, Baripada, Odisha
- Loyola School, Bhubaneswar, Odisha
- Loyola School, Jamshedpur, Jharkhand
- Loyola School, Thiruvananthapuram, Kerala
- Loyola School, Kozhikode, Kerala
- Loyola Convent Primary School, Palayamkottai, Tamilnadu
- St.Ignatius Convent Higher Secondary School, Palayamkottai, Tamilnadu

===== Australia =====
- Loyola College, Melbourne, secondary school in Watsonia, a suburb of Melbourne, Victoria
- Loyola College, Mount Druitt, secondary school in New South Wales

===== Indonesia =====
- Kolese Loyola, Semarang, Central Java

==== New Zealand ====
- St Ignatius of Loyola Catholic College, Drury

==== Africa ====
===== Kenya =====
- St. Ignatius Mukumu Boys, high school in Kakamega, Kenya

===== Nigeria =====
- Loyola Jesuit College, secondary school in Abuja, Nigeria
- Loyola College, Ibadan, Nigeria

===== Tanzania =====
- Loyola School, Dar es Salaam, Tanzania

==== North America ====
===== Canada =====
- Loyola Campus, Concordia University, Montreal, Quebec
- Loyola Catholic Secondary School, Mississauga, Ontario
- Loyola High School (Montreal), Quebec
- St. Ignatius of Loyola Secondary School (Oakville), Ontario

===== United States =====
- Loyola Academy, Wilmette, Illinois
- Loyola Blakefield, Towson, Maryland
- Loyola Catholic School, Mankato, Minnesota
- Loyola College Prep, Shreveport, Louisiana
- Loyola High School (Detroit), Michigan
- Loyola High School (Los Angeles), California
- Loyola Sacred Heart High School, Missoula, Montana
- Loyola School (New York City), Manhattan, New York
- Saint Ignatius High School (Cleveland), Cleveland, Ohio
- St. Ignatius College Preparatory, San Francisco, California
- St. Ignatius College Preparatory School, Chicago, Illinois

==== South America ====
- Colegio San Ignacio de Loyola (Caracas), La Castellana, Caracas, Venezuela
- Colegio San Ignacio de Loyola (Medellín), Medellín, Antioquia, Colombia
- Colegio San Ignacio de Loyola (San Juan), San Juan, Puerto Rico
- Loyola College, Belo Horizonte, MG, Brazil
- Colegio Loyola Gumilla, Ciudad Guayana, Bolívar, Venezuela

=== Universities and colleges ===
==== Canada ====
- The former Loyola College (Montreal), Quebec (now Concordia University)
  - Loyola International College, part of Concordia University
- Loyola Student Residence & Loyola Academic Complex, part of Saint Mary's University (Halifax), Nova Scotia

==== India ====
- Andhra Loyola College, Vijayawada, Andhra Pradesh
- Loyola Academy, Secunderabad, Andhra Pradesh
- Loyola College, Chennai, Tamil Nadu

==== Peru ====
- Universidad San Ignacio de Loyola (St. Ignatius of Loyola University) (USIL), Lima, Peru
  - San Ignacio University, the university's international campus in Miami.
  - Instituto San Ignacio de Loyola (ISIL), the university's institute for short careers, Lima, Peru

==== United States ====
- Loyola Marymount University, Los Angeles, California
  - Loyola Law School
  - Loyola Marymount Lions, this school's intercollegiate athletic program
- Loyola University Chicago, Illinois
  - Loyola University Chicago School of Law
  - Loyola University Medical Center
  - Loyola Ramblers, the school's intercollegiate athletic program
- Loyola University Maryland, Baltimore, Maryland (formerly, Loyola College)
  - Loyola Greyhounds, the school's intercollegiate athletic program
- Loyola University New Orleans, Louisiana
  - Loyola University New Orleans College of Law
- St. Ignatius College, renamed John Carroll University, Cleveland, Ohio

==== Elsewhere ====
- Instituto Politécnico Loyola (Loyola Polytechnic Institute), Benemérita de San Cristóbal, Dominican Republic
- Loyola College of Culion, Palawan, Philippines
- Loyola University Andalusia, Seville and Cordoba, Spain

== Science ==
- 3589 Loyola, a main-belt asteroid

== Spirituality ==
- Loyola Hall, Rainhill, Merseyside, United Kingdom
- Loyola House, Guelph, Ontario, Canada
- Villa Loyola, Sudbury, Ontario, Canada

== See also ==
- St. Ignatius High School (disambiguation)
- Saint Ignatius College (disambiguation)
