= St. Joseph College, Barranquilla =

Private school in Atlántico, Colombia

Colegio San José, Barranquilla
- Spanish: Colegio San José

Location
- Carerra 21 & Calle 40, Barranquilla, Atlántico; Colombia
- Coordinates: 10°57′40″N 74°47′26″W

Information
- Type: Private primary and secondary school
- Religious affiliation: Catholicism
- Denomination: Jesuit
- Patron saint: Saint Joseph
- Established: 1918; 108 years ago
- Rector: Gabriel Jaime Perez Montoya
- Director: Carlos Alberto Cardona,
- Staff: 174
- Grades: K–12
- Gender: Co-educational
- Enrollment: 1,184
- Publication: Link
- Website: colsanjose.edu.co

Colegio San José, Barranquilla (Spanish: Colegio San José) is a private Catholic primary and secondary school, located in the San Jose section of Barranquilla, Atlántico, Colombia. The co-educational school was founded by the Society of Jesus in 1918 and currently covers kindergarten through baccalaureate.

It opened its doors on 15 February 1918.

== See also ==
- Education in Colombia
- List of schools in Colombia
- List of Jesuit schools
