= St. Francis Xavier College, Pasto =

St. Francis Xavier College
- Spanish: Colegio San Francisco Javier

Location
- San Juan de Pasto, Nariño; Colombia
- Coordinates: 1°12′55″N 77°16′36″W

Information
- Type: Private pre-school, primary and secondary school
- Religious affiliation: Catholicism
- Denomination: Jesuit
- Patron saint: Francis Xavier
- Established: 1925; 101 years ago
- Administrator: Oscar Pantoja Agreda
- Rector: Diego Giraldo Aristizábal S.J.
- Director: Carlos Arturo Rueda Gomez
- Teaching staff: 93
- Grades: Pre-school, K-Baccalaureate
- Gender: Coeducational
- Enrollment: 1,328
- Website: www.javeriano.edu.co

St. Francis Xavier College (Spanish: Colegio San Francisco Javier), is a private Catholic pre-school, primary, and a secondary school, located in San Juan de Pasto, Nariño, Colombia. The school was founded by the Society of Jesus in 1925. The kindergarten through seventh grade was opened in 1956, under the care of the Sisters of St. Joseph.

== See also ==
- Education in Colombia
- List of schools in Colombia
- List of Jesuit schools
