= ICFES examination =

Standardized test in Colombia

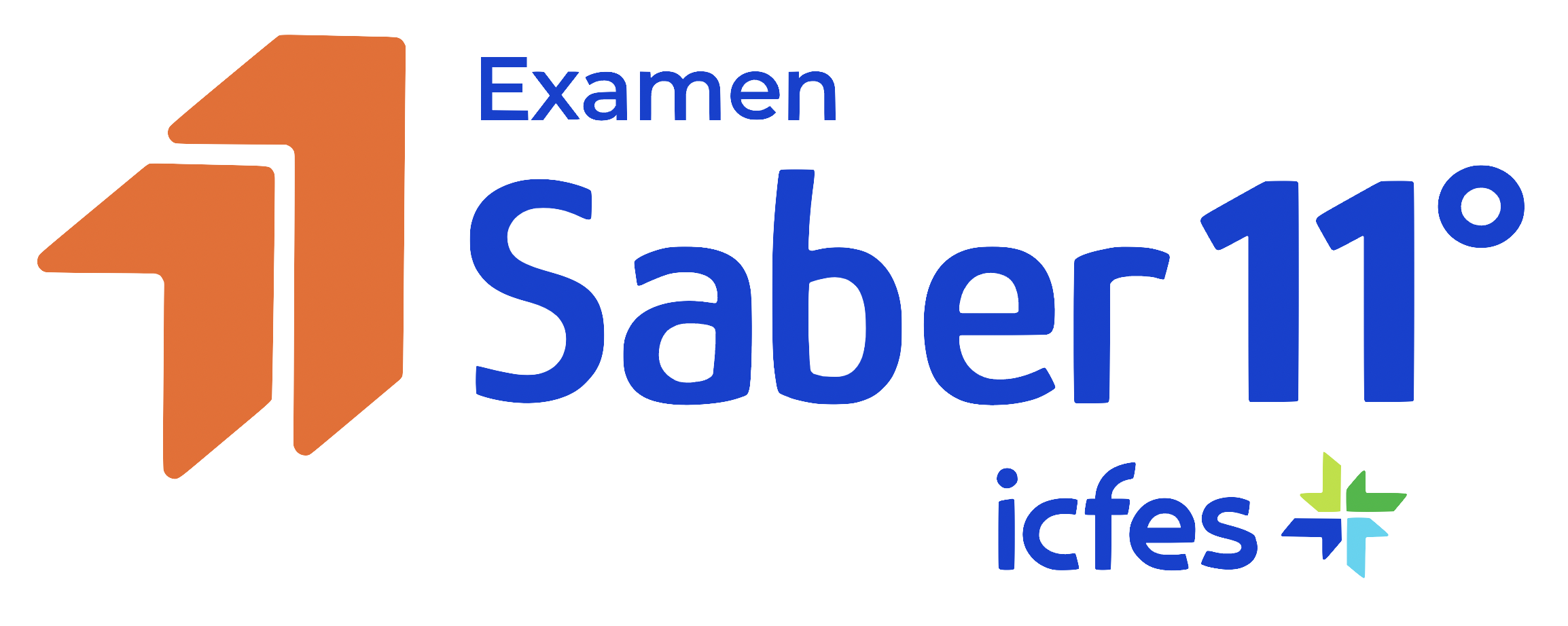
- Type: High school exit examination
- Administrator: ICFES, Ministry of Education
- Skills tested: Critical reading, mathematics, social studies, science, English proficiency
- Purpose: Admission to undergraduate programs of universities
- Year started: 1966; 60 years ago
- Duration: 9 hours, two 4 1/2 hour sessions
- Score range: 0-500; each subject scores on scale of 0-100
- Offered: March and August
- Regions: Colombia
- Languages: Spanish
- Annual number of test takers: About 640,000 11th-grade students
- Prerequisites: Be enrolled in 11th grade or hold a high school diploma and a valid ID for registration.
- Used by: Private and public universities offering undergraduate programs in Colombia
- Website: www.icfes.gov.co

The ICFES examination, or Saber 11, is a high school exit examination administered annually in grade 11 in Colombian high schools. The exam is standardized, similar to the SAT and ACT examinations taken by high school students in the United States. The purpose of the exam is to evaluate students' aptitude in five subjects: critical reading, mathematics, social studies, science, and English. Each exam question has four multiple-choice answers, except for the English section which provides between three and eight possible answers for each question.

Although the ICFES provides several tests for different academic purposes, the Saber 11 is nationally recognized as the most important test because it evaluates students' academic readiness for admission into institutions of higher learning.

== Purpose ==
The exam is usually taken by high school seniors, but students who have already obtained their diplomas and want to improve their scores can also take it. The examination is intended to measure basic academic skills that are needed for college success, such as critical reading, quantitative reasoning, civic skills, scientific reasoning, and proficiency in a second language.

ICFES, which stands for the Colombian Institute for the Evaluation of Education, is the institution in charge of the nationwide administration of the exam. The institute also uses the results for research purposes and public policy design for the improvement of secondary education throughout Colombia.

Both private and public universities in Colombia use the exam score as the main criterion for admissions. More competitive programs of study, such as medicine, require a higher score.

== Structure ==
The exam has five sections:

- Critical reading (41 questions)
- Mathematics (50 questions, equally distributed between two sessions)
- Social studies (50 questions, equally distributed between two sessions)
- Natural science (58 questions, equally distributed between two sessions)
- English (55 questions)
- Socioeconomic questionnaire (24 questions; does not generate a score)

=== Critical reading ===
The critical reading section contains passages from different academic and literary sources. Answers to all of the questions are based on content explicitly stated or implied by the passage. This section of the test also includes questions that measure the philosophical knowledge of the student.

=== Mathematics ===
A large portion of the math section is problem-solving, in which students are required to both analyze and draw conclusions from numerical data (like graphs and charts) or compute answers to a problem using previous mathematical knowledge. The other portion of the exam requires knowledge in advanced topics like calculus, algebra, trigonometry, probability, and conic sections.

=== Social studies ===
The social studies questions include a context or sources like charts, graphs, pictures, newspapers, or academic essays that the student must analyze to propose a solution to a problem. The exam tests knowledge of the Colombian Constitution, economic principles, global history, national and international politics, and geography.

=== Natural science ===
The natural science section evaluates biology, chemistry, and physics. Questions usually require the student to explain or predict a phenomenon stated on a diagram or a text using previous knowledge. A large portion of the test is experimental and requires the student to propose an experiment to evaluate different phenomena or to describe which variables are involved in the result and what would change if those variables were modified. For physics, topics evaluated include kinematics, electromagnetism, waves, and thermodynamics. For chemistry, inorganic and organic chemistry, mixtures, reactions, and stoichiometry are tested. For biology, concepts include cellular biology, DNA, genetics, ecosystems, evolution, and food webs.

=== English ===
The English section is evaluated during the second examination session. It consists of seven parts with increasing complexity and is intended to evaluate text comprehension and use of English. The first part evaluated basic English comprehension through translations and transcriptions. The last part consists of four passages of increasing difficulty. For two of the passages, the student answers a series of questions based on the content stated or implied in the passages. For the other two passages, the student selects a word that correctly fits a sentence from a selection of grammatically correct words.

=== Normative ===
The exam is intended to evaluate the student's academic skills on each subject. The internal structure of the exam is designed following evidence-centered design and states that skills (competencies) are defined by a series of affirmations. These affirmations are formulated using research-based evidence. Evidence is evaluated by tasks and items, which are composed of a context, a question, and four possible answers.

=== Scoring ===
The ICFES exam qualifies students using percentiles and a global score that ranges between 1 and 500 points, while each subject score ranges between 1 and 100 points. Scores are computed based on the three-parameter logistic model.

== Logistics ==
The exam is divided into two sessions, each lasting four hours and 30 minutes. ICFES assigns students to different testing centers at schools throughout the Colombian territory, so most students can reach nearby schools to take the exam. ICFES manages the logistics of the exam but contracts different companies transport valuables that ensure the integrity of the test.

The exam is available twice every year, and students can choose at what time they will take it according to the month they are graduating, typically either in June or December. Usually students that are graduating in June take the exam in March, and those who are graduating in December take it in August. The day of the exam is always a Sunday, and it is divided into two four-hour sessions. During each session, students are allowed to go to the restroom one time. As soon as a student is done, that student can leave the room as long as more than two and a half hours have passed since the session started.

Until 2020, this examination was not considered for admission at Universidad Nacional de Colombia, one of Colombia's main public colleges, because the university administers its own test. However, prospective students now must take the ICFES exam to apply to the university. Due to the COVID-19 pandemic, the university decided to drop its own admission test and began considering the ICFES examination score as part of the entrance criteria.

== Global scores and percentiles ==
The following chart summarizes the scores obtained by students during the second application of the exam in 2019. In this particular exam administration, a total of 546,212 students took the examination.

Percentiles for Total Scores (2019)
| Score, 0-500 scale | Percentile |
|---|---|
| 477 | 99.99982* |
| 470 | 99.99945 |
| 460 | 99.99908 |
| 450 | 99.9985 |
| 440 | 99.9934 |
| 430 | 99.987 |
| 420 | 99.978 |
| 410 | 99.945 |
| 400 | 99.89 |
| 390 | 99.81 |
| 380 | 99.61 |
| 370 | 99.20 |
| 360 | 98.5 |
| 350 | 97.4 |
| 340 | 95.8 |
| 330 | 93.7 |
| 320 | 90.9 |
| 310 | 88 |
| 300 | 83 |
| 290 | 79 |
| 280 | 73 |
| 270 | 68 |
| 260 | 61 |
| 250 | 54 |
| 240 | 47 |
| 230 | 40 |
| 220 | 33 |
| 210 | 26 |
| 200 | 20 |
| 190 | 14 |
| 180 | 9.6 |
| 170 | 5.7 |
| 160 | 2.8 |
| 150 | 1.1 |
| 140 | 0.27 |
| 130 | 0.058 |
| 120 | 0.026 |
| 110 | 0.018 |
| 100 | 0.012 |
| 0 | 0.000* |
*The highest score nationwide was 477. The lowest was 0.

== History ==
The exam was created in 1966 when the Colombian Association of Universities and the University Fund signed Agreement Number 65. They reached this agreement based on research from the Colombian government and members of Colombian universities. Initially, the exam used a scoring scale that ranged between 100 and 400 points and was heavily based on memory and concepts. Subjects evaluated included biology, chemistry, physics, social studies, proficiency in Spanish, mathematics, and an elective subject that could be a foreign language or a logical reasoning test.

In 2000, the exam was completely restructured to evaluate academic skills rather than concept memorization. The modified exam also evaluated eight required subjects: language, mathematics, social studies, philosophy, biology, chemistry, physics, and a second language (usually English, French, or German), and two elective subjects (usually the Environment or Violence & Society). Performance on each test was graded on a scale from 0 to 110-120 points, depending on nationwide results. Higher maximum scores were seen on subjects with the worst nationwide performance. Global performance indicators were delivered to each student using a metric named puesto (place), which ranged from 1 to 1,000. Each puesto contained 0.1% of the total population and was calculated through an index that was based on a normalized average of the scores for each subject and score distribution. Qualifying at Puesto 1 meant that a student was at the top 0.1% of their exam administration.

In 2014, the current exam was introduced and completely replaced the previous exam. This new version is more aligned with international exams such as the SAT and reduces the former eight compulsory subjects to five areas: critical reading, mathematics, social studies, natural science, and English.

In 2016, ICFES phased out the puesto metric and began using more traditional percentiles.

== Awards ==
ICFES awards students who get the best results nationwide each year. In a televised ceremony called La Noche de Los Mejores ("The Evening of the Best Ones"), both the President of Colombia and the Education Minister give a medal known as "Distinción Andres Bello" to students who rank in the top 50 nationally or in the top 10 in each department of Colombia. Awards are also given to the top 0.2% of students from public schools in each city and the schools with the best aggregate results.

Disadvantaged students who score highly on the exam can be recipients of Generación E, a state scholarship that grants them access to the most prestigious colleges and universities in Colombia.

== See also ==
- ACT (test), a college entrance exam in the US similar to the ICFES exam
- SAT, a college entrance exam in the US similar to the ICFES exam
- Abitur, German equivalent examination
- Matura, equivalent examination in many European countries
- Baccalauréat, French equivalent examination
- List of admissions tests
