= St. Ignatius High School =

St. Ignatius High School may refer to:

- Saint Ignatius School, Wentworth, New South Wales, Australia
- St. Ignatius School, Winnipeg, Manitoba, Canada
- St. Ignatius High School (Thunder Bay), Thunder Bay, Ontario, Canada
- St. Ignatius High School (Mahalakshmi), Mumbai, India; near Sant Gadge Maharaj Chowk monorail station
- St. Ignatius High School MRT station, Taipei, Taiwan
- St. Ignatius College Preparatory, San Francisco, California, U.S.
- St. Ignatius College Prep, Chicago, Illinois, U.S.
- Saint Ignatius High School (Cleveland), Cleveland, Ohio, U.S.

== See also ==
- St. Ignatius' Convent Higher Secondary School, Palayamkottai, Tirunelveli, India
- St. Ignatius of Loyola Catholic Secondary School, Oakville, Ontario
- St. Ignatius Catholic School (disambiguation)
- Saint Ignatius College (disambiguation)
- Saint Ignatius of Loyola
- Saint Ignatius of Antioch
- Saint Ignatius of Constantinople
- St. Ignatius (disambiguation)
- Loyola (disambiguation)
- Ignatius Gymnasium, Catholic high school in Amsterdam, North Holland, Netherlands
