= St. Aloysius Gonzaga College, Manizales =

Coordinates: 5°3′31.55″N 75°29′52.37″W

St. Aloysius College Gonzaga, Manizales Colegio San Luis Gonzaga
- , Calle 54 no. 27-35; Manizales, Colombia

Information
- Type: Jesuit, Catholic
- Established: 1954; 72 years ago
- Rector: Alvaro Velez Escobar
- Director: Dora Patricia Galeano Ramirez
- Staff: 133
- Grades: 2 preprimary through eleventh
- Gender: Coeducational
- Enrollment: 940
- Website: San Luis Gonzaga

St. Aloysius College (Spanish: Colegio San Luis) is a mixed-gender Catholic school in Manizales, Caldas, Colombia serving two years of kindergarten through grade 11.

The school was established by the Society of Jesus in 1954. Initially, it offered classes for boys for grade five of primary school and grades one and two of high school. The following year, construction began on the current school building. The school moved to coeducation in the 1980s.

== See also ==
- Education in Colombia
- List of Jesuit schools
