= Colegio San Pedro Claver =

Private Catholic school in Santander, Colombia

Location
- Carrera 28 No. 47 – 06; Bucaramanga; Santander; Colombia
- Coordinates: 7°7′3.17″N 73°6′47.95″W

Information
- Type: Private primary and secondary school
- Religious affiliation: Catholic
- Denomination: Jesuit
- Patron saint: Peter Claver
- Established: 1897; 129 years ago
- Principal: William Carvajal Ochoa
- Teaching staff: 147
- Grades: K-12
- Gender: Co-educational
- Enrollment: 1,377
- Color: 2.1 hectares (5.2 acres)
- Mascot: Harrier
- Nickname: Claverians
- Publication: El Claveriano
- Affiliation: Association of Jesuit Schools of Colombia (ACODE)
- Website: www.colsanpedro.com

Colegio San Pedro Claver is a private Catholic primary and secondary school, located in Bucaramanga, in the Santander Department of Colombia. The school was founded by the Society of Jesus in 1897 and is named in honour of St Peter Claver, the patron saint of Colombia. Students and graduates of the school are known as Claverians.

== History ==
The school in Bucaramanga was founded in 1886 after an agreement between Fr. Luis Antonio Gamero, Jesuit Superior in Colombia, and Senator Alejandro Peña Solano representing the government of Santander Department. Classes began the following year. Construction of a school building began in 1903. The Departmental Assembly caused the closure of the establishment and the pro-school board was founded in 1938. With the authorization of Fr. General Wladimir Ledkowski, SJ, construction began at the present Sotomayor location in December 1948. Classes include kindergarten through elementary at Conucos with the high school at Sotomayor.

In 2017 the college celebrated its 120th anniversary.

== Facilities and programs ==
Former logo of El Colegio de San Pedro Claver de Colombia

School facilities include library, technology and science laboratories, fitness center, swimming pool, regulation soccer fields, and running track. Sports accommodated include soccer, basketball, table tennis, volleyball, swimming, indoor soccer, and microfutbol. English is taught and exchange programs are maintained with Canada and New Zealand. The school also has Villasunción retreat center which has overnight accommodations for 89 persons.

Outreach programs include Jesuit Service to Migrants, Fe y Alegria, nursing homes, Children's Home, Fundar, Romelio Children's Foundation, Angel Custodian foundation for the elderly, Jesus of Nazareth Home, and the Ignatian Haitian solidarity network. Footprints Youth Movement organized by the Jesuits throughout Colombia has 280 members at St. Peter Claver.

Cultural activities include a dance group, rhythm band, Claverian Children's music group, ballet group, and symphony ensemble. The College helped host the 5th National Cheerleading and Dance Championships.

The robotics team from the school has represented Colombia in international competition, winning the World Automation Competition held in Mexico in 2013, the "Support Awards" during the World Vex Robotic's Competition, and the "Team Spirit" award in Anaheim, California, United States.

== See also ==
- Catholic Church in Colombia
- Education in Colombia
- List of Jesuit schools
