= Cathedral of St. Ignatius of Loyola =

Cathedral of St. Ignatius of Loyola may refer to:

- Cathedral of St. Ignatius de Loyola, Junín, Argentina
- St. Ignatius Cathedral, San Ignacio de Velasco, Bolivia
- St. Ignatius Cathedral, Shanghai, China
- Cathedral of St. Ignatius of Loyola, Vilnius, Lithuania
- Cathedral of St. Ignatius Loyola (Palm Beach, Florida), United States

== See also ==
- St. Ignatius Church (disambiguation)
