= St. Ignatius =

Saint Ignatius or St. Ignatius may refer to:

== People ==
=== Saints ===
- Ignatius of Antioch (c. 35 – between 98 and 117), bishop and martyr, Church Father
- Ignatios of Constantinople (c. 797 – 877), Patriarch of Constantinople
- Ignatius of Oña (c. 1000 – 1057), Benedictine abbot
- Ignatius of Smolensk (died 1210), bishop and wonderworker in the Eastern Orthodox Church
- Ignatius of Loyola (1491–1556), Spanish Basque priest and founder of the Society of Jesus (Jesuits)
- Ignatius of Methymna (1492–1566), metropolitan of Methymna in the Eastern Orthodox Church
- Ignatius of Santhià (1686–1770), Italian Capuchin friar
- Ignatius of Laconi (1701–1781), Sardinian Capuchin friar
- Ignacio Clemente Delgado Cebrián (1761–1838), Spanish Dominican bishop and martyr in Vietnam
- Ignatius Brianchaninov (1807–1867), Russian Orthodox bishop and theologian
- Ignacy (Bazyluk) (died 1942), hieromartyr of the Polish Orthodox Church

=== Blesseds ===
- Inácio de Azevedo (1526–1570), Portuguese Jesuit missionary and martyr
- Nazju Falzon (1813–1865), Maltese cleric and catechist
- Ignacy Kłopotowski (1866–1931), Polish priest and founder of the Sisters of the Blessed Virgin Mary of Loreto
- Ignatius Maloyan (1869–1915), Armenian Catholic archbishop and martyr
- Ignacy Dobiasz (1880–1941), Polish Salesian priest and martyr in Auschwitz
- Ignacy Antonowicz (1890–1941), Polish Salesian priest and martyr in Auschwitz

=== Venerables and Servants of God ===
(Candidates for canonization whose official causes are underway)

- Ignatius Spencer (1799–1864), English Passionist priest, declared Venerable
- Ignác Stuchlý (1869–1953), Salesian priest, declared Venerable
- Ignacy Świrski (1885–1968), Polish bishop of Siedlce, Servant of God

== Places ==
- St. Ignatius, Guyana, a village in Upper Takutu-Upper Essequibo
- St. Ignatius, Montana, a town in the United States
- St. Ignatius Hospital, a historic hospital in Colfax, Washington, United States

== See also ==
- St. Ignatius Church (disambiguation)
- Saint Ignatius College (disambiguation)
- St. Ignatius High School (disambiguation)
- St. Ignatius Catholic School (disambiguation)
