= St. Ignatius Catholic School =

St. Ignatius Catholic School may refer to:

- St Ignatius Catholic School, Toowong, Australia
- St. Ignatius of Loyola Catholic School, Wellington Catholic District School Board, Canada
- St. Ignatius Catholic School (Cayman Islands)
- St. Ignatius Catholic School, Saint Heliers, New Zealand
- St. Ignatius Catholic Primary School, Sunbury on Thames, United Kingdom

== See also ==
- Saint Ignatius College (disambiguation)
- St. Ignatius High School (disambiguation)
- St. Ignatius (disambiguation)
