= St. Ignatius College, San Sebastian =

Coordinates: 43°19′23.14″N 1°57′55.24″W

- Av de Navarra, San Sebastián (Donostia); Guipúzcoa, Spain

Information
- Type: Jesuit, Catholic
- Established: 1929; 97 years ago
- Director: Amaia Arzamendi Sesé
- Grades: Ages 2 through 18
- Gender: Coeducational
- Enrollment: 1,600
- Other name: San Ignacio Ikastetxea, Donostia
- Website: www.donostiajesuitak.org

St. Ignatius College, San Sebastian ("Donostia" in Basque), on the northwest coast of Spain was founded by the Society of Jesus in 1929 and currently includes pre-primary through the baccalaureate. It is also affiliated with the nurseries of the Servants of Jesus and of the Carmelite Teresiana Missionaries.

On 1 October 1929 classes began at San Ignacio de Loyola School in San Sebastián. The first lay director, Amaia Arzamendi, was appointed in 2009.

== See also ==
- List of Jesuit sites
