= St. Ignatius College, Pamplona =

St. Ignatius College
- Spanish: Colegio San Ignacio

Location
- Pamplona; Spain
- Coordinates: 42°48′30″N 1°38′17″W

Information
- Religious affiliation: Catholicism
- Denomination: Jesuit
- Patron saint: Ignatius Loyola
- Established: 1946; 80 years ago
- Grades: K-12; including baccalaureate
- Gender: Coeducational
- Website: www.jesuitaspamplona.org

St. Ignatius College (Spanish: Colegio San Ignacio) is a private Catholic primary and secondary school, located in Pamplona, Spain. The school was founded by the Society of Jesus in 1946. The school includes infant, primary, ESO, and baccalaureate, in addition to attending to diversity through the Transition Unit and the Specific Curriculum Unit.

== History ==
In 1946 Colegio San Ignacio opened at 31 Mayor Street with three classes of students. The next year it moved to Paso Arrieta villa, and two years later to 17 Media Luna Street, since its 128 students had outgrown the current school. In 1951, with he Bishop officiating, the new school at 32 Calle Bergamin opened, now with 291 students.

In 1959 the Church of the Immaculate was opened. Loyola Hall was inaugurated in 1962. The College grew with the opening of Padre Moracho building in 1964. There were then 898 students.

In 1983 construction began on a six-storey building on Larrabide Street. In the next year twelve students were admitted to the new EGB program. Enrollment reached its peak in 1986, at 1,826 students.

== See also ==
- Catholic Church in Spain
- Education in Spain
- List of Jesuit schools
