= Iglesia de San Ignacio (Santiago de Chile) =

Catholic church and national monument of Chile

Coordinates: 33°26′51″S 70°39′25″W

Church of Saint Ignatius
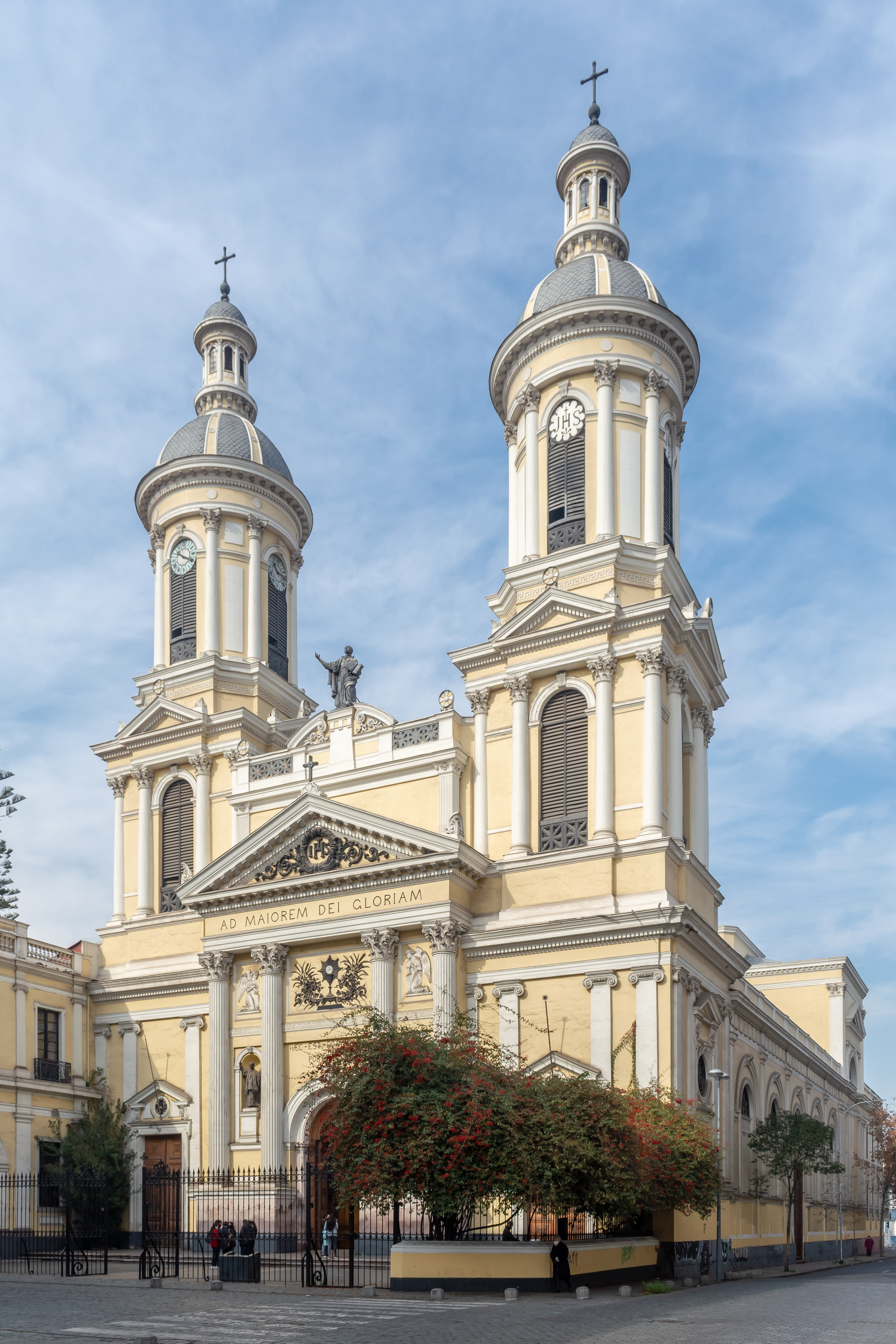

Religion
- Affiliation: Roman Catholic

Location
- Municipality: Santiago
- Country: Chile
- Interactive map of Church of Saint Ignatius

Architecture
- Architects: Eusebio Chelli; Eugenio Joannon; Ignacio Cremonesi
- Style: Neoclassical
- Groundbreaking: 1867
- Completed: 1900

The iglesia San Ignacio, also known as iglesia del Colegio de San Ignacio, is a Roman Catholic church founded by the Society of Jesus in Santiago, Chile. It is next to the Colegio San Ignacio, and was declared as a National Historic Monument in 2002.

== History ==
The church building was built to replace the former Church of the company, destroyed by a fire on 8 December 1863. It was designed by the Italian architect Eusebio Chelli, who had led the construction of the Iglesia de la Recoleta Dominica and the Iglesia de las Agustinas. The foundation stone was laid on 15 December 1867. The construction was stopped and Chelli abandoned the church project in 1872. Three naves were built in clay brick masonry. On 17 November 1872, the church was blessed by the then Vicar Apostolic of Kansas, John Baptist Miège S.J., who was visiting Chile.

Between 1899 and 1900, were built two towers — the first reinforced concrete towers in Chile—, designed by the French architect Eugenio Joannon. On the other hand, the facade was designed by the Italian architect Ignacio Cremonesi.

The church building was damaged as a result of the 2010 Chile earthquake. This included cracks in its structure and destruction of architectural ornaments on walls. A restoration project was completed in July 2011.

The church is Renaissance Revival in style. On the portico entablature is inscribed: Ad maiorem Dei gloriam ( Ignatius of Loyola's favorite quote), and over the entrance is inscribed the Latin motto: Haec est domus Dei et porta coeli (This is the house of God and the gate of heaven, cite from Genesis 28:17).

Its two towers are 47 metres high, are 20 tons weight, have a square plan and are topped with a cupola. The east tower features four clock faces made in Bilbao and installed in 1901 by Evaristo Molina. The west tower has three bells, two of which were made from a bell that hung in the former church, which was destroyed in the before mentioned fire. With a help of the then president Federico Errázuriz Zañartu, along with the minister Aníbal Pinto, the bell was returned to the Jesuits and it was melted down.

The interior of the church contains a gilded Baroque-Revival-style main altar, and a three-manual pipe organ built by Aristide Cavaillé-Coll, which has over 2,200 pipes and 33 registers, being one of the largest musical instruments in Chile.

== See also ==
- List of Jesuit sites
