= St. Ignatius College, Messina =

Coordinates: 38°12′23.03″N 15°33′2.86″E

- Via Ignatianum, Messina, Italy

Information
- Type: Jesuit, Catholic
- Established: 1548; 478 years ago
- Status: Location of first Jesuit college
- Grades: Primary through high school
- Gender: Coeducational
- Affiliation: Jesuit Education Foundation
- Website: IgnazioMessina

St. Ignatius College, Messina, is a Catholic educational complex, primary through high school. It strives to carry on the educational tradition of the Jesuits which dates back to 1548 in Messina. This tradition is kept alive largely through the efforts of the Italian Jesuit Education Foundation.

== School program and outreach ==
St. Ignatius College is a member of the Jesuit Education Foundation, created by the Italian Jesuits, which offers various services to schools in the Jesuit tradition, to compensate for the declining number of Jesuits in this apostolate. It strives to keep alive the ideals of Ignatian Pedagogy through teacher training and its Italian Jesuit Educational Center.

School programs include, from the primary level on, English as a primary language, piano and flute, and use of the tablet computer. Architectural science is offered from the first year of high school and Eipass certification is also offered. There is a foreign study option in Spain and French is also taught. The main sports activities sponsored by the school are basketball, soccer, volleyball, and artistic gymnastics.

Services offered to the wider community include credit courses on sports-related topics in conjunction with the a National Olympic Committee and the University of Messina Sports Center, including anatomy, physiology, chemistry, and biology. The school also runs a day care center.

In May 2016 the College founded an animal park and petting zoo.

== See also ==
- List of Jesuit sites
