= St. Ignatius Church (Winnipeg) =

Catholic church in Manitoba, Canada

Coordinates: 49.867477°N 97.161212°W

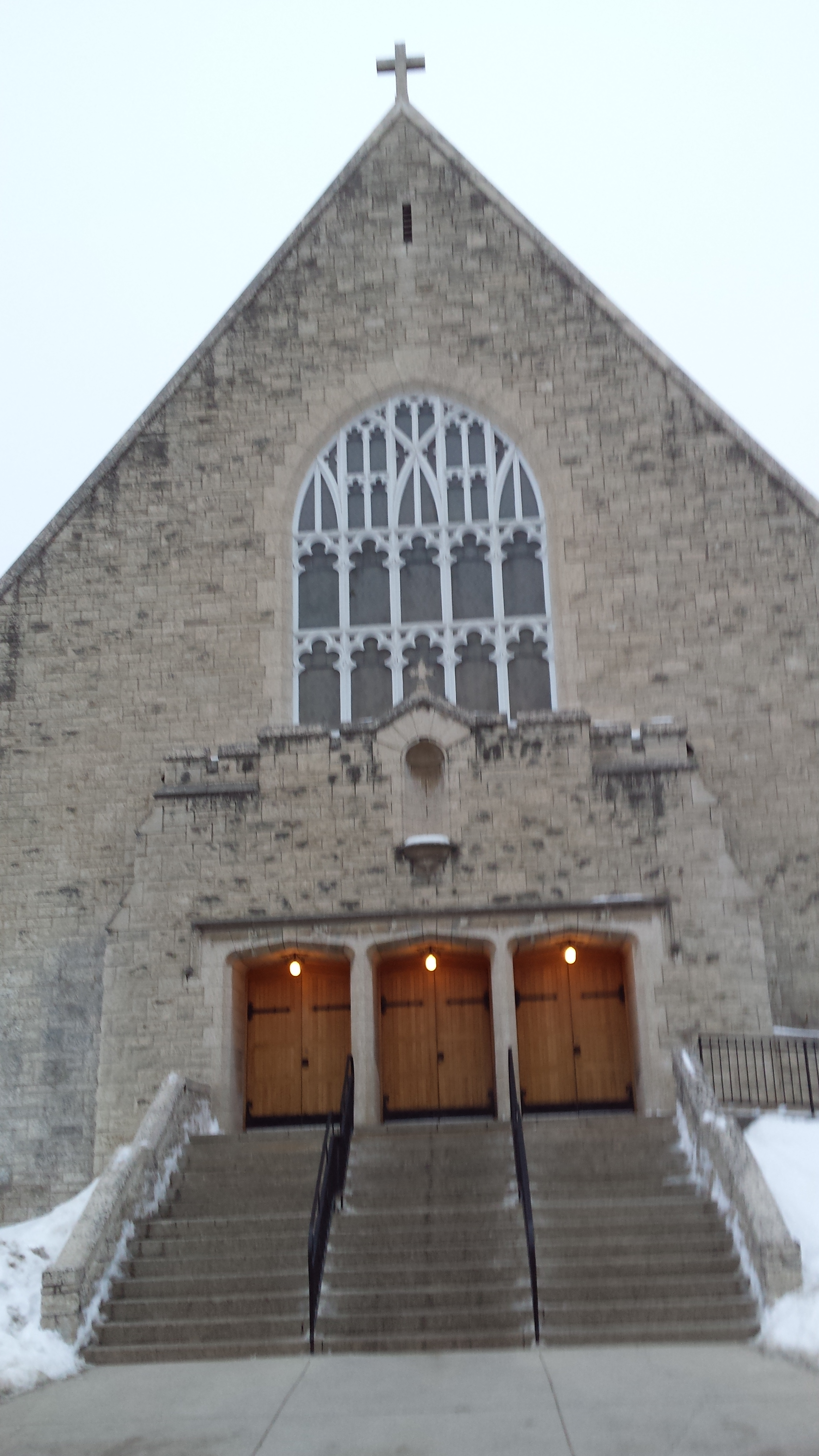
- Front entrance

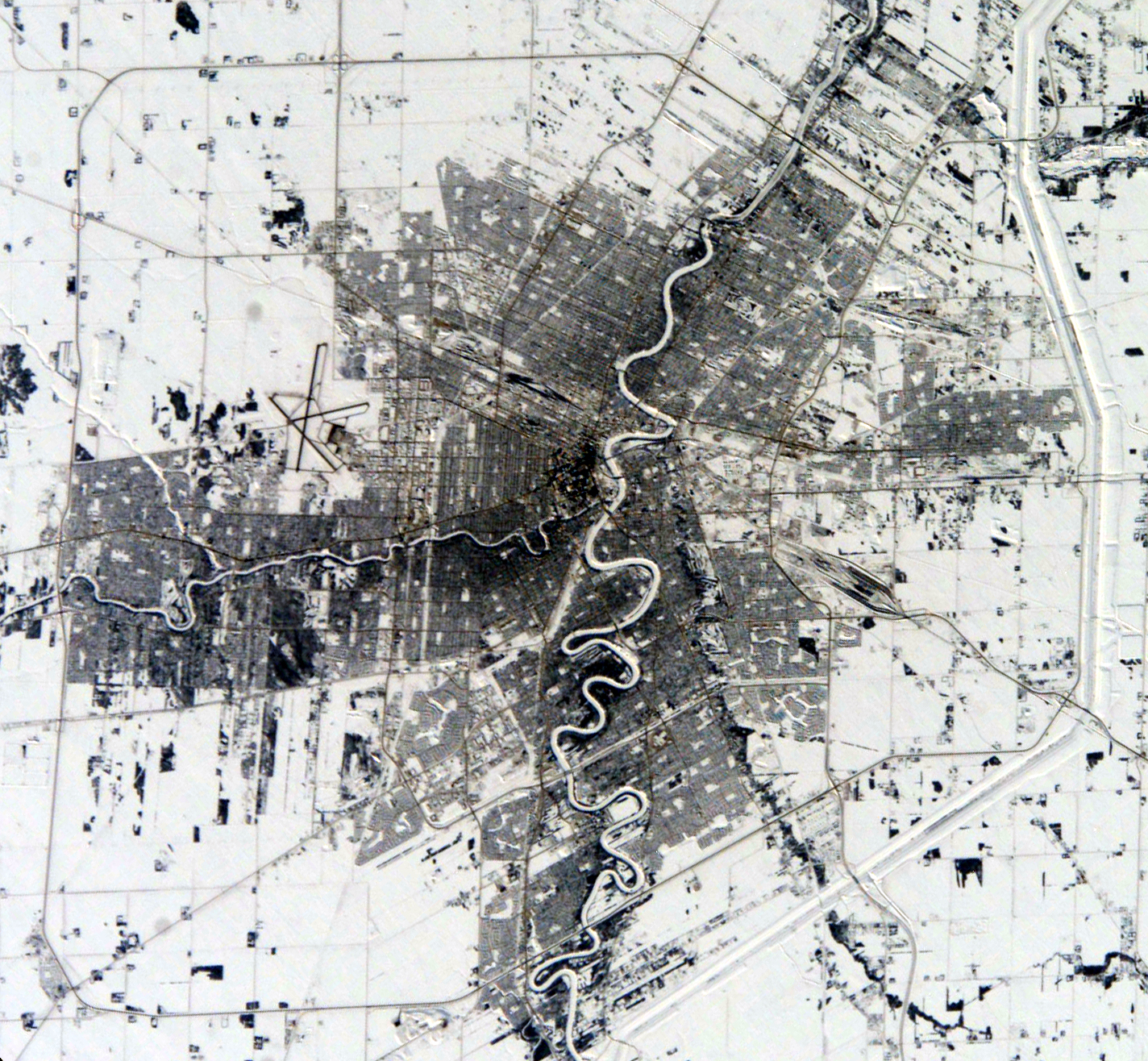
- Location in Winnipeg
- Location: 255 Stafford Street; Winnipeg, Manitoba; R3M 2X2
- Country: Canada
- Denomination: Catholic Church
- Website: StIgnatiusParish.ca

History
- Status: Active
- Founded: 1908
- Founder: Society of Jesus
- Dedication: Ignatius of Loyola
- Dedicated: 17 March 1912
- Consecrated: February 1929

Architecture
- Functional status: Parish church

Administration
- Archdiocese: Winnipeg
- Deanery: South Winnipeg

St Ignatius Church is a Catholic parish church in Winnipeg, Manitoba, Canada. It was founded in 1908 by the Society of Jesus and went on to found St. Ignatius School. It is situated on the corner of Stafford Street and Corydon Avenue on the south side of the Assiniboine River.

== History ==
In 1908, the Archbishop of Saint-Boniface, Adélard Langevin created St. Ignatius Parish and Fr Lewis Drummon SJ was appointed as the first parish priest. On 16 February 1908, the first Mass was celebrated in a rented store at 109 Osborne Street with a congregation of 140 people. Two months later, a site was bought on the corner of McMillan and Nassau streets as well as a Baptist church in the area. In November 1908, Fr John C. Coffee SJ replaced Fr Drummon.

In 1909, the site of the present church was bought.

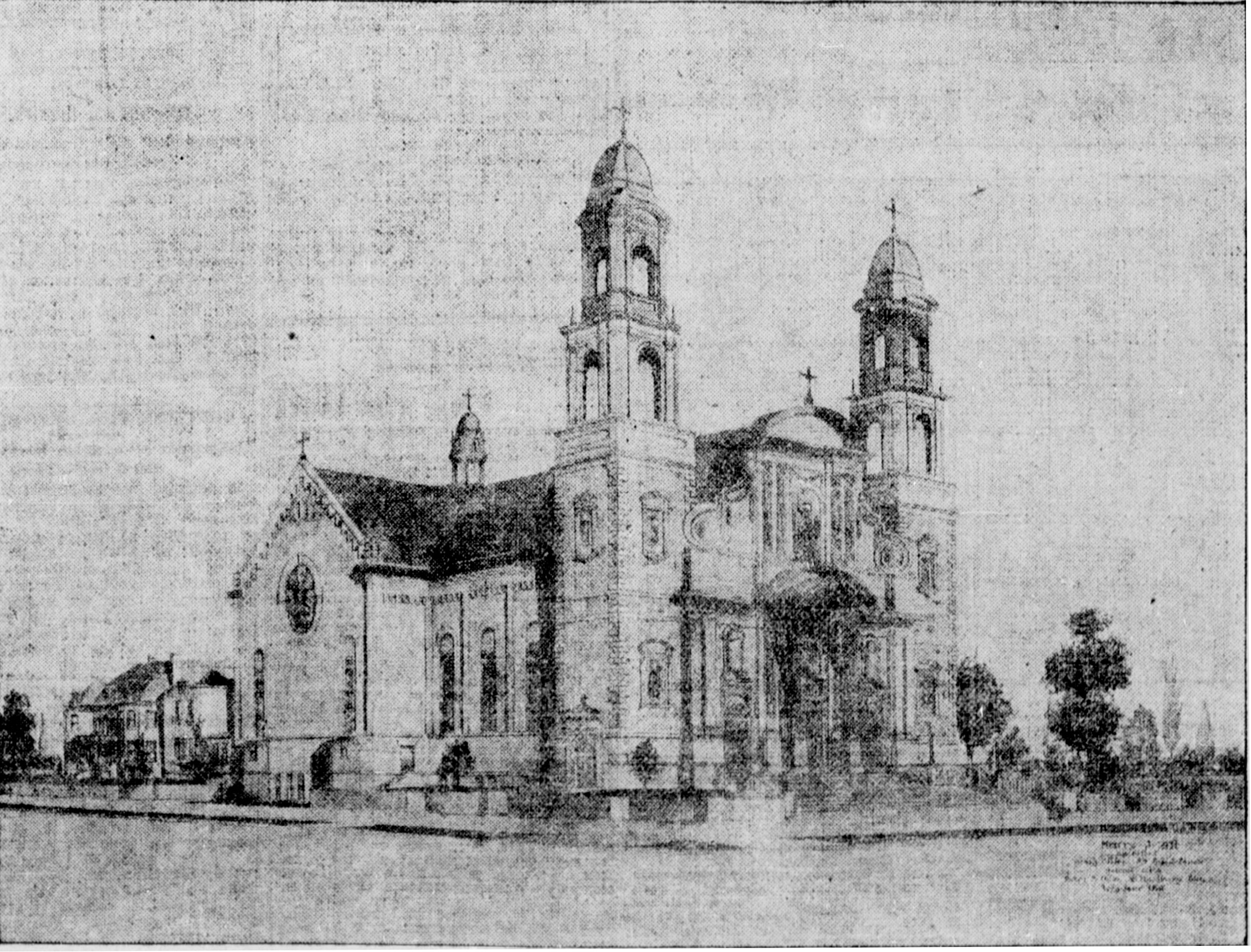
Initial architectural drawing of St.Ignatius Parish c. 1911

Work on laying the foundations of the church and school started in September 1910. On 9 January 1912, the school opened and on 17 March 1912, Mass was first celebrated in the church basement, while the rest of the church was being completed.

In 1928, the school was extended to accommodate eight rooms. In February 1929, the church was consecrated by the Archbishop of Winnipeg, Arthur Sinnott. In 1946, the population within the parish had grown to such an extent, that Our Lady of Victory Memorial parish was created from St Ignatius'. In 1957, another parish, St John Brebeuf was also created from St Ignatius'. Masses were originally held in the gymnasium of St John Brebeuf School until the church was built in 1965.

== Parish ==
The church hosts six Sunday Masses. From October to June 30 they are at 5:00pm on Saturday evening; 8:00am, 9:30am and 11:00am on Sunday morning; at 3:40pm on Sunday afternoon for a Spanish language Mass and at 8:30 pm on Sunday evening. From July 1 to September 30 there are only two Sunday morning Masses 9:00am and 11:00am, the rest of the Masses remaining at the same times except for Sunday evening Mass which is at 9:00pm. There is a weekday Mass at 7:15 am on Monday (and an 11:00am Lay Service) and 11:00am Masses from Tuesday to Saturday.

The church has a relationship with St Ignatius School. The school was continually expanded in the 20th-century and after a fire in 2007, was rebuilt. It was staffed by the Sisters of the Holy Names of Jesus and Mary from their main school in Winnipeg St. Mary's Academy until the early 1990s.

== Music ministry ==
Between 1969 and June 2013 folk-rock-jazz music group Discernment performed at the 9 pm Sunday Mass. The group was formed by Rita Doerr (vocals) at the age of 14 in 1969 while attending St. Mary's Academy. Jeff Doerr (keyboard), Eileen Grant-MacLeod (vocals), Dan Leonhardt (drums), Daryl Torchia (bass guitar) and Keith Macpherson (vocals, guitar) as well as others, including Butch Jularbal (vocals, guitar), Peter Allen (bass guitar) also organist at St. Mary's Cathedral, Mary Peterson (vocals), and Linda DePauw (vocals), joined the group. The music attracted young people from all over metro Winnipeg.

== See also ==
- List of Jesuit sites
- St. Ignatius School
- Society of Jesus
