= St Ignatius Roman Catholic Church and Convent, Bourke =

St Ignatius Roman Catholic Church
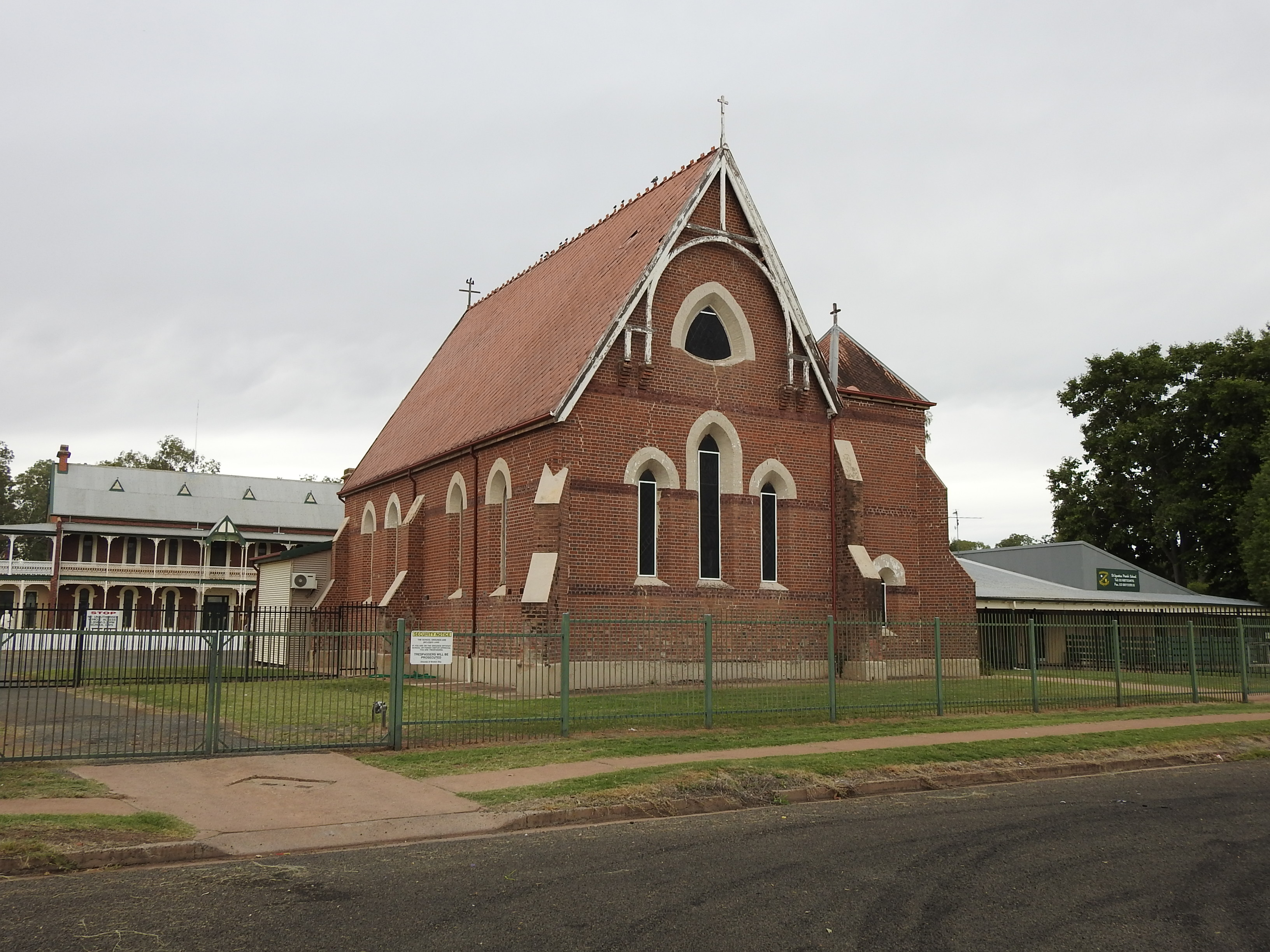
- Catholic church (2021).

- Location in New South Wales
- 30°05′16″S 145°55′56″E
- Location: 3–7 Meek Street, Bourke, Bourke Shire, New South Wales
- Country: Australia
- Denomination: Catholic
- Website: www.wf.catholic.org.au/parishes/bourke/

History
- Status: Church
- Dedication: Saint Ignatius of Loyola

Architecture
- Functional status: Active
- Architectural type: Victorian Carpenter Gothic
- Completed: April 1874

Administration
- Diocese: Wilcannia-Forbes
- Parish: Bourke

New South Wales Heritage Register
- Official name: St. Ignatius Roman Catholic Church, Convent & Site; St Ignatius Roman Catholic Church
- Type: State heritage (built)
- Designated: 2 April 1999
- Reference no.: 603
- Type: Church
- Category: Religion

St Ignatius Roman Catholic Church and Convent is a heritage-listed Roman Catholic church and former convent at 3–7 Meek Street, Bourke, in the Orana region of New South Wales, Australia. The property is owned by the Diocese of Wilcannia-Forbes, and used by the Parish of Bourke. It was added to the New South Wales State Heritage Register on 2 April 1999.

== History ==
St Ignatius Roman Catholic Church is the oldest documented building in Bourke, opening in April 1874.

The wrought iron St Ignatius Convent building was built in 1896.

In 2015, the convent and church received $150,000 in state government funding to return the convent to its 1924 state, remove inappropriate additions and balcony infill, and repair deteriorating woodwork, while weatherproofing both church and convent.

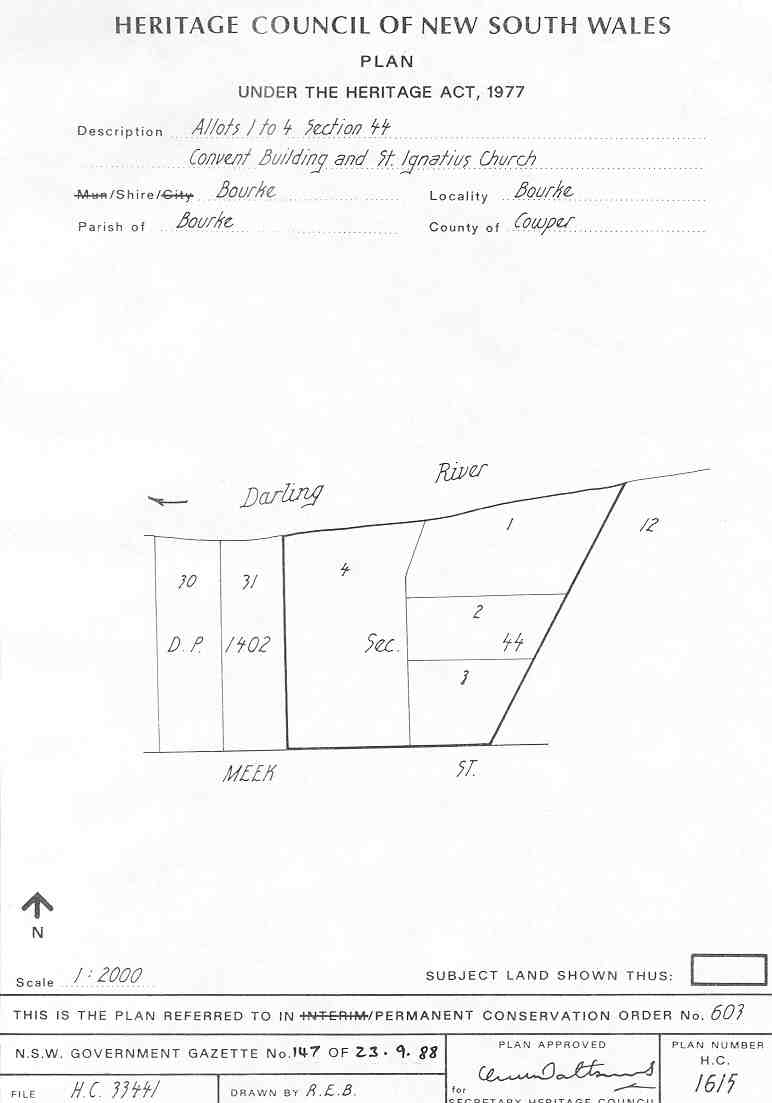
St Ignatius Roman Catholic Church and Convent heritage boundaries

== Heritage listing ==
St Ignatius Roman Catholic Church and Convent was listed on the New South Wales State Heritage Register on 2 April 1999.

== See also ==
- List of Roman Catholic churches in New South Wales
