= ICFES =

Government agency of Colombia

ICFES is an acronym for Instituto Colombiano para el Fomento de la Educación Superior ("Colombian Institute for the Promotion of Higher Education"). It is a Colombian organization that manages and evaluates the education and Institutes (Schools and Facilities) in Colombia. It has the legal power to shut down schools that do not meet educational standards and it manages and provides the national evaluation test for entering higher education institutions (Colleges and Universities). The institute's mission is the improving of quality of education in Colombia.

== The ICFES Examination ==
The ICFES exam is a standardized test similar to the American SAT. The test is administered prior to graduation in Colombian high schools. (Grade 11th). The test is thoroughly developed and published by the ICFES.

Although ICFES provides several tests for different academic purposes, the ICFES test is nationally recognized as the most important test since it qualifies students according to their actual academic skills and therefore it can affect the possibilities that a student might have to be accepted in College.

The test was originally created in 1966, when the Colombian Association of Universities and the University Fund signed the Agreement number 65. This agreement was reached after a research made by the Colombian Government and members of Colombian Universities.

The test is an intensive one. The test is totally managed by ICFES and different contracts with companies that transport valuables as a way to make the test safely delivered to the students and preventing fraudulent results or illegal copying.

Between September 7 and 8, 1968, the National Testing Service conducted Colombia's first National Examinations, in which the following components were evaluated: mathematical aptitude, verbal aptitude, abstract reasoning, spatial relations, social sciences and philosophy, chemistry, physics, biology and English.

== Duration and grading system ==
Currently the ICFES exam has a duration of nine hours, divided into blocks of four and a half hours. The test happens two times each year, in different moments for students of different calendars. The first time in March, and the second time in August.

ICFES is divided into five categories, each having a maximum score of 100:

1. Natural Sciences
2. Social and Civic
3. Mathematics
4. Critical Reading
5. English Language

The exam has a total possible score of 500, but very few students have gotten that score over the years. Most students desire to get a score above 400 points to have a higher chance to enter at a public college or get a scholarship for a private university.

== Other Functions ==
ICFES also works as a mediating system between schools and colleges. It has a close relationship with most institutions by keeping and maintaining important databases regarding scores, teachers and alumni. It also participates as a consultant institution for the developing of technologies in Colombia.
