= Colegio Técnico Comercial Santa María Goretty =

Technical school in Cali, Colombia

Coordinates: 3.43199°N 76.50484°W

Colegio Tecnico Comercial Santa Maria Goretty is a technical school located in downtown Cali in Colombia.

It started as a small primary school and has evolved into a technical high school with a specialisation in accounting. It takes its name from Maria Goretti (16 October 1890 – 6 July 1902), an Italian virgin-martyr of the Roman Catholic Church.

Notable pupils have included athlete Valeria Cabezas.
