= St. Ignatius School =

Catholic school in Winnipeg, Canada

Location
- 239 Harrow Street; Winnipeg, Manitoba, R3M 2Y3; Canada; 49°52′01″N 97°09′46″W

Information
- Type: Independent
- Religious affiliations: Catholic, Jesuit
- Founded: January 12, 1911
- Grades: N–8
- Gender: Co-ed
- Colours: Blue and White
- Mascot: Lions
- Website: www.stignatius.mb.ca

St. Ignatius School is a Roman Catholic school in Winnipeg, Manitoba. It was opened on January 12, 1911, by the Parish of St. Ignatius. The school is located in the neighborhood of Rockwood in the River Heights area. The school and church share one city block, bounded by Corydon Avenue to the north, Jessie Avenue to the south, Stafford Street to the east and Harrow Street to the west.

The school serves 240 co-ed students from Nursery to Grade 8.

The school is the only Catholic school N-8 in Winnipeg that does not wear uniforms.

An electrical fire on February 20, 2007, damaged the oldest remaining wing - originally built in 1956. These were rebuilt and classes resumed by the fall of 2007.

== See also ==
- List of Jesuit schools
