= St. Ignatius of Loyola College, Las Palmas =

Private primary and secondary school in Gran Canaria, Canary Islands

St. Ignatius of Loyola College
- Spanish: Colegio San Ignacio de Loyola

Location
- Las Palmas, Gran Canaria, Canary Islands; Spain
- Coordinates: 28°5′57.72″N 15°24′44.38″W

Information
- Type: Private primary and secondary school
- Religious affiliation: Catholicism
- Denomination: Jesuit
- Patron saint: Ignatius Loyola
- Established: 1917; 109 years ago
- Director: Víctor Prieto Marañón
- Grades: K-12, including baccalaureate
- Gender: Co-educational
- Website: www.fundacionloyola.es/sanignacio

St. Ignatius of Loyola College (Spanish: Colegio San Ignacio de Loyola) is a private Catholic primary and secondary school with middle school technical training, located on Las Palmas, in Gran Canaria, in the autonomous community of the Canary Islands, Spain. The school was founded by the Society of Jesus in 1917, and has grown to cover infant through baccalaureate and middle technical training.

The school is located in the old part of the city. It accommodates from first year of infant education through baccalaureate and professional training of middle degree.

== See also ==
- Catholic Church in Spain
- Education in Spain
- List of Jesuit schools
