= Loyola University Andalusia =

Jesuit college in Spain

Coordinates: 40°25′20.3″N 3°42′21.26″W

- Former names: Superior Technical School of Business Agriculture (1963-2010)
- Type: Private Catholic Research Non-profit Coeducational Higher education institution
- Established: June 7, 2010; 16 years ago
- Religious affiliation: Roman Catholic (Jesuit)
- Academic affiliations: IAJU UNIJES-Universidades Jesuitas de España
- Chairman: Fr.Jaime Oraá Oraá, SJ
- Chancellor: Fr.Francisco J.Ruiz Perez, SJ
- President: Fr.Ildefonso Camacho Laraña, SJ
- Rector: Gabriel María Pérez Alcalá
- Location: Escritor Castilla Aguayo, 4 Córdoba, Andalucía, Spain
- Campus: Seville and Córdoba
- Colors: Blue and white
- Website: www.uloyola.es

Loyola University Andalusia (Spanish: Universidad Loyola Andalucía) is a private Catholic higher education institution run by the Spanish Province of the Society of Jesus in Spain with campuses in Seville and Córdoba, It opened it doors for classes in the 2013-14 academic year.

The university includes undergraduate education with an initial list of nine Bachelor's degrees to be taught. A graduate school, called Loyola Leadership School, offers master's degrees related to all of the nine undergraduate programs plus five doctorates. Loyola University Andalusia conducts student exchanges with top-ranked universities around the world, among them its partner Loyola University Chicago.

== History ==
The university originated in ETEA, the Faculty of Economic and Business Sciences of Córdoba, a higher education centre founded in 1963. The establishment of Loyola University Andalusia was approved by the Parliament of Andalusia on 23 November 2011. The first promotion enrolled in 2013.

In 2019 a new Campus was opened in Dos Hermanas (Seville). Campus Palmas Altas closed.

== Campuses ==
The university has two campuses: Campus recently opened in Dos Hermanas (Seville) and Campus de Córdoba ETEA in Córdoba.

== Faculties and schools ==
The university contains three undergraduate faculties and schools and two postgraduate schools:

- Undergraduate
  - Faculty of Economic and Business Sciences
  - Faculty of Social, Law and Education Sciences
  - Higher Technical School of Engineering
- Postgraduate
  - Loyola Leadership School
  - Doctoral School

== See also ==
- List of Jesuit sites
