= St. Ignatius of Loyola College, Timor-Leste =

St. Ignatius of Loyola College
- Portuguese: Colégio de Santo Inácio de Loiola

Location
- Kasait, Ulmera, Liquiça; Timor-Leste; 8°34′28″S 125°27′43″E

Information
- Type: Private Catholic secondary school
- Motto: Latin: Ad Maiorem Dei Gloriam (For the greater glory of God)
- Religious affiliation: Roman Catholic (Jesuit)
- Patron saint: Ignatius Loyola
- Established: 2013; 13 years ago
- Founder: Society of Jesus
- Faculty: 36
- Enrollment: 693 (2018)
- Website: timor-leste-jesuits.org/what-we-do/education/colegio-de-santo-inacio-de-loiola-secondary-school

St. Ignatius of Loyola College (Portuguese: Colégio de Santo Inácio de Loiola, abbreviated as CSIL), is a private Catholic secondary school, located in Kasait, Ulmera, Liquiça, Timor-Leste. The school was founded by the Timor-Leste Region of the Society of Jesus in 2013 near the capital city of Dili, with its first intake of students, in Year 7. The school aims to form young East Timorese to become men and women of intellectual competence, religious with conscience, and humanly compassionate toward their fellow human beings. The school was officially inaugurated on 25 January 2014.

As a Jesuit school, St. Ignatius of Loyola College's philosophy is to promote the spiritual, academic, social, emotional, psychological and physical development of its students.

In 2018 the school had 693 students and 36 qualified teachers.

== See also ==
- Catholic Church in Timor-Leste
- List of Jesuit schools
