= St. Ignatius College, Santiago =

- Spanish: Colegio San Ignacio Alonso Ovalle

Location
- Alonso de Ovalle & San Ignacio; Santiago; Chile
- Coordinates: 33°26′51.28″S 70°39′22.87″W

Information
- Type: Private primary and secondary school
- Religious affiliation: Catholicism
- Denomination: Jesuit
- Patron saint: Ignatius Loyola
- Established: 1856; 170 years ago
- Founder: Rafael Valentín Valdivieso; Society of Jesus
- Trust: Jesuit St. Ignatius Foundation
- Administrator: Jaime Laso Fresno
- Rector: Marcelo Mackenney Poblete
- Teaching staff: 89
- Gender: Boys: 1856 – 2014; Co-educational: since 2015
- Enrollment: 1,313
- Mascot: Devil
- Affiliations: Latin American Federation of the Society of Jesus (FLACSI); Ignatian Educational Network
- Website: www.colegiosanignacio.cl

St. Ignatius College, Santiago (Spanish: Colegio San Ignacio Alonso Ovalle) is a private Catholic primary and secondary school, located in Santiago, Chile. The school was founded by the Society of Jesus in 1856 and is run by the Jesuit St. Ignatius Foundation as a part of the Ignatian Educational Network of Chile, the Latin American Federation of Jesuit Colleges, and the Latin American Federation of the Society of Jesus (FLACSI).

The school is the second oldest private school in Santiago after Padres Franceses de Santiago.

== History ==
In 1854, San Ignacio was founded by Jesuits from Buenos Aires at the behest of Rafael Valentín Valdivieso, Archbishop of Santiago. The school opened in 1854 in Santiago and within a year had 150 students. To the classroom building and Jesuit residence the Church of St. Ignatius was added in 1859.

== Notable alumni ==
- Carlos Walker Martínez (1842-1905), lawyer and politician
- Federico Errázuriz Echaurren (1850-1901), lawyer, politician and 13th President of Chile
- Javier Ángel Figueroa (1862-1945), lawyer and politician
- Emiliano Figueroa (1866-1931), lawyer, politician and 19th President of Chile
- Agustín Edwards Mac-Clure (1878-1941), lawyer, diplomat and businessman
- Juan Esteban Montero (1879-1948), lawyer, politician and 21st President of Chile
- Vicente Huidobro (1893-1948), poet, writer, editor and literary critic
- Saint Alberto Hurtado SJ (1901-1952), Jesuit priest, lawyer, social worker, and writer; canonized in 2005.
- Bernardo Leighton (1909-1995), lawyer and politician
- Gabriel Valdes (1919-2011), lawyer, diplomat and politician
- Sergio Livingstone (1920-2012), football player
- Carlos González Cruchaga (1921-2008), Bishop and founder of Catholic University of the Maule
- Julio Silva Solar (1926-2014), lawyer, writer, university professor, and politician
- Claudio Bravo (1936-2011), painter
- Juan Luis Ossa Bulnes (born 1942), lawyer, academic, mining entrepreneur, and politician
- Mariano Fernandez (born 1945), politician
- Jaime Ravinet (born 1946), politician, lawyer, academic and businessperson
- Pablo Longueira (1958), civil engineer and politician
- Rafael Araneda (born 1969), television presenter
- Raimundo Tupper (1969-1995), football player
- Felipe Seymour (1987), football player

== See also ==
- Catholic Church in Chile
- Education in Chile
- List of Jesuit schools
