= St. Ignatius of Loyola College, Alcala de Henares =

St. Ignatius of Loyola College
- Spanish: Colegio San Ignacio

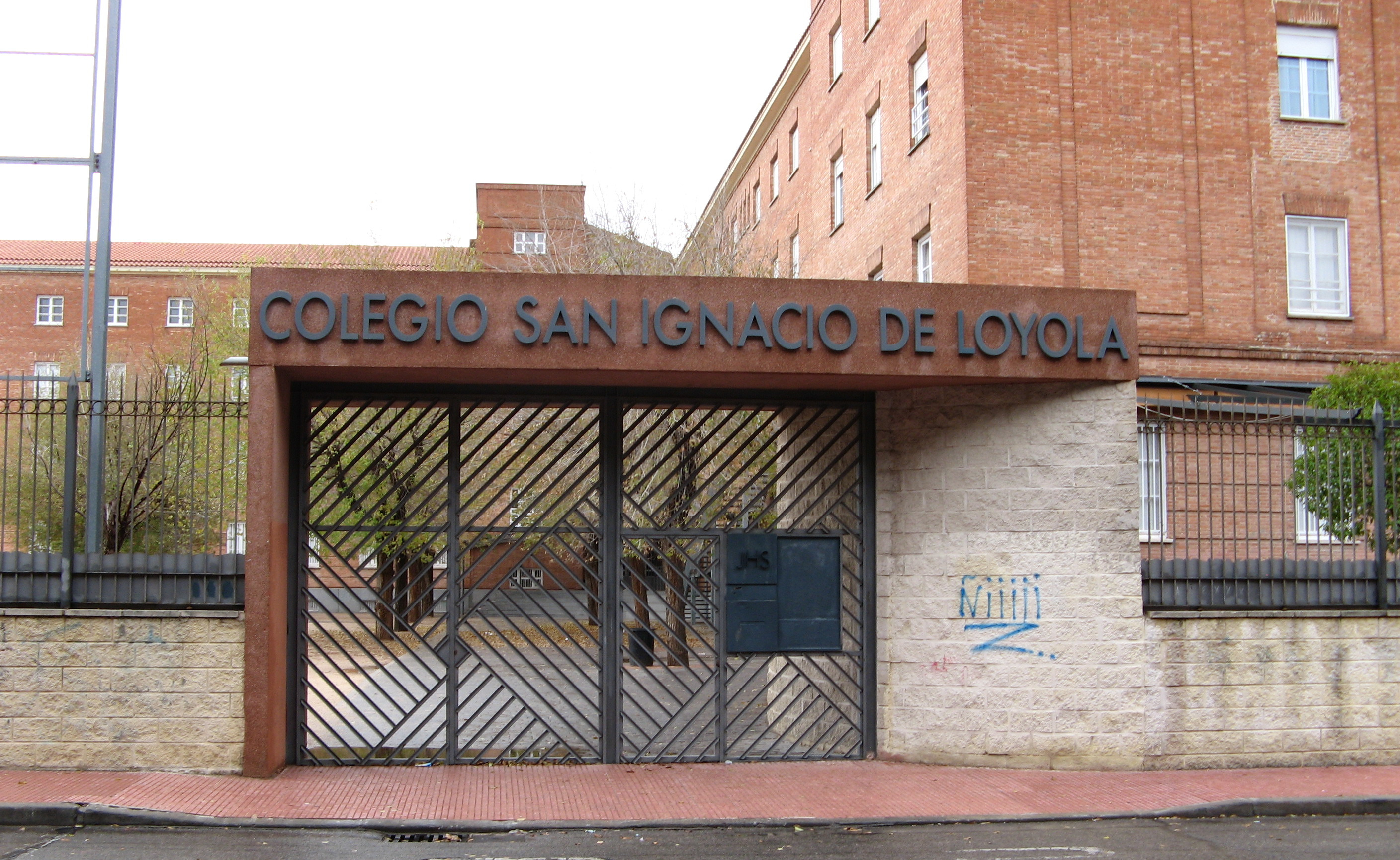

Location
- Alcalá de Henares, Madrid; Spain
- Coordinates: 40°29′47″N 3°21′58″W

Information
- Type: Private primary and secondary school; and vocational training college
- Motto: Fill yourself with life. In all love and service.
- Religious affiliation: Catholic
- Denomination: Jesuit
- Patron saint: Ignatius Loyola
- Established: 1953; 73 years ago
- Rector: Enrique Climent
- Director: Dolores Arranz
- Principal: Luis Bru
- Teaching staff: 42
- Grades: K-12; ESO and vocational technology
- Gender: Co-educational
- Enrollment: 532
- Publication: Gesto
- Website: www.sanignacioalcala.es

St. Ignatius of Loyola College (Spanish: Colegio San Ignacio) is a private Catholic primary and secondary school and vocational training college, located in Alcalá de Henares, Madrid, Spain. The school was founded by the Society of Jesus in 1953.

== History ==
The history of Colegio San Ignacio began in 1955 with the construction of a school of philosophy for Jesuits studying for the priesthood; the primary school had preceded it in 1953. With the arrival of the philosophate came the Jesuit archives, which since 2014 have included most of the archival materials of the Jesuits in Spain. The present building was opened in 1971 when the school of philosophy moved to Madrid.

The school includes early childhood, primary, and ESO, as well as vocational training in electricity and electronics. There are 532 students served by 42 teachers.

In 1970 the future Pope Francis would stay with the Jesuit fathers in Alcalá de Henares while completing his final year of spiritual studies leading to solemn profession of vows in the Society of Jesus.

== See also ==
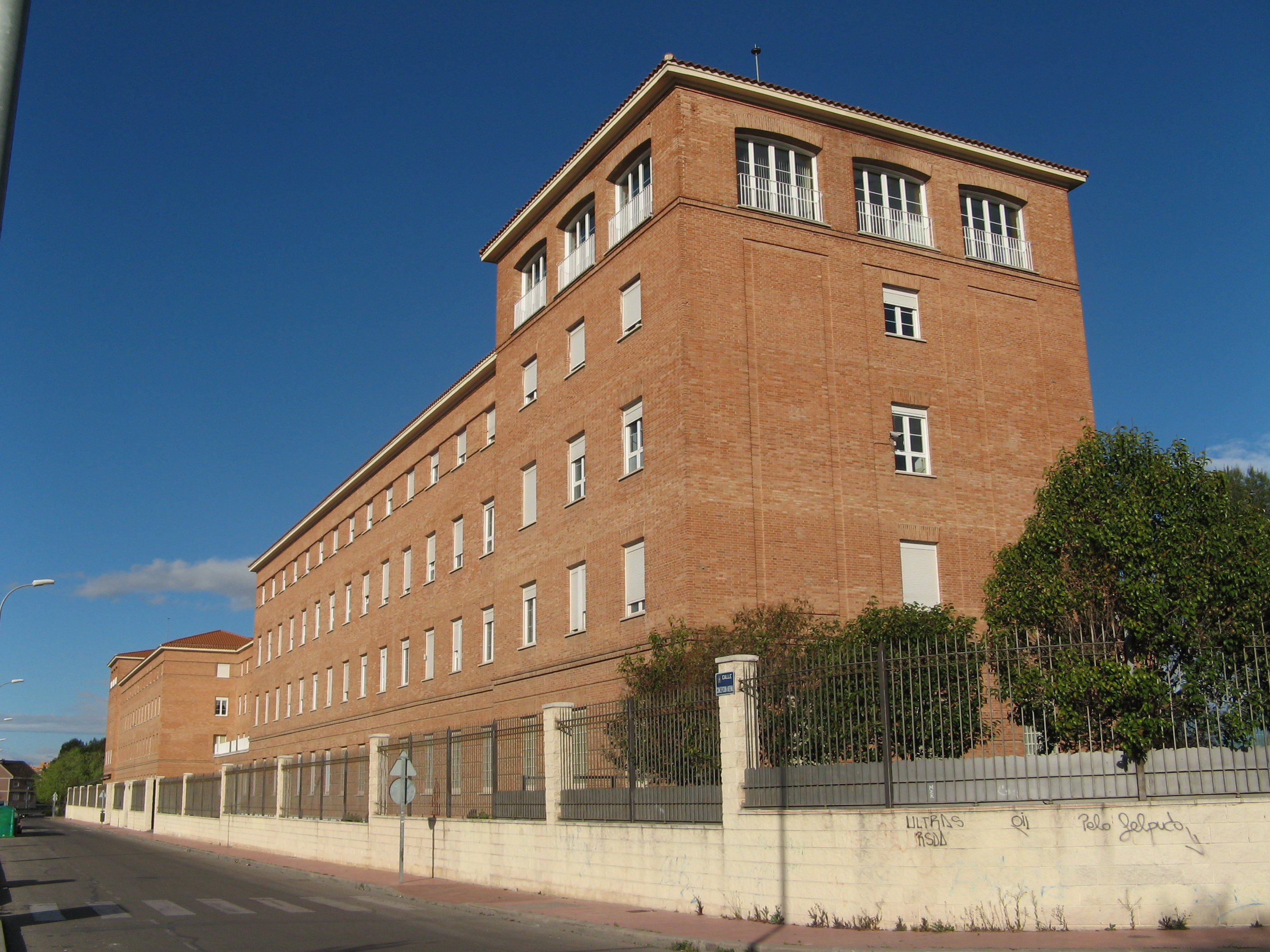

- Catholic Church in Spain
- Education in Spain
- List of Jesuit schools
