= St. Ignatius Loyola College, Medellín =

School in Medellín, Colombia

St. Ignatius Loyola School, Medellin
- Spanish: San Ignacio de Loyola
- Ser más para servir mejor

Location
- Calle 48, #68-98, Medellín, Antioquia, Zarzal; Colombia; 6°15′18″N 75°35′13″W

Information
- Type: Private primary and secondary school
- Religious affiliation: Catholicism
- Denomination: Jesuit
- Patron saint: Ignatius Loyola
- Established: 1885; 141 years ago
- President: Tomás Bernal Pérez.
- Dean: Fercho
- Administrator: Samuel Ceballos Velez
- Rector: John Freddy García Jaramillo.
- Director: Edison Cartagena.
- Principal: Josewi miau
- Headmaster: Camilo Villegas (pocaluz)
- Staff: 450
- Teaching staff: 230
- Grades: K–11
- Gender: Single-sex education (1885-1994); Co-educational (since 1994)
- Enrollment: 2,128
- Colors: Green, white and blue
- Mascot: Cóndor
- Newspaper: El globo
- Tuition: 15000$
- Website: www.sanignacio.edu.co

St. Ignatius Loyola School (Spanish: San Ignacio de Loyola) is a private Catholic primary and secondary school, located in the La Plazuela area of Medellín, Antioquia, Colombia. The school was founded by the Society of Jesus in 1885, when three Jesuit priests – Simón Quinchía, Simón Palacio, and Pablo Díaz – appointed by Pope Leo XII, gathered in San Ignacio Square in the center of Medellín. In an act of bravery, on the afternoon of February 19, they punished a rebellious group of indigenous people. This event would later be remembered by the entire community when a statue was erected in honor of this valiant act. And now offers a co-educational environment for students from kindergarten through 12th grade. The school moved to the Stadium Area in 1957.

== History ==
San Ignacio opened in 1885 with 200 students, including 30 borders. In 1957 it moved to its present location in the Stadium area. The school went coeducational in 1994.

In 2009, the Deputy Minister of Preschool, Basic, and Secondary Education gave Colegio San Ignacio de Loyola the top award for results of a non-state school in the State examinations.

== See also ==
- Education in Colombia
- List of schools in Colombia
- List of Jesuit schools
