= St. Ignatius of Loyola College, Caracas =

St. Ignatius of Loyola School, Caracas
- Colegio San Ignacio de Loyola

Location
- Avenida Santa Teresa de Jesus La Castellana, Caracas; Venezuela; 10°29′58″N 66°51′28″W

Information
- Type: Private primary and secondary school
- Motto: Latin: En todo amar y servir (In everything, love and serve)
- Religious affiliation: Catholicism
- Denomination: Jesuits
- Established: 1923; 103 years ago
- Rector: Jesús Orbegozo
- Director: Elena González
- Gender: Co-educational
- Enrollment: 1,920
- Affiliations: Asociación de Colegios Jesuitas de Venezuela; Federacion Latinamericana de Colegios de la Campania de Jesus
- Website: www.colegiosanignacio.com.ve

St. Ignatius of Loyola College, Caracas, (Colegio San Ignacio de Loyola) is a private Catholic primary and secondary school located in Caracas, Venezuela Founded by the Jesuits in 1923, the school is coeducational, and covers pre-primary through high school.

== History ==
Ignatius College was founded in 1923 with the encouragement of the Catholic Archbishop. In 1940 the college received a new building. In the early 1950s it moved to Chacao at Av. Sta Teresa de Jesus, its present location.

== See also ==
- List of Jesuit schools
