= St Ignatius of Loyola Catholic College =

School in Drury, New Zealand

Location
- 458 Burtt Road, Drury, Auckland, New Zealand; 37.128776°S 174.930444°E

Information
- Type: State integrated
- Religious affiliation: Roman Catholic
- Established: 2024; 2 years ago
- Ministry of Education Institution no.: 949
- Principal: Catherine Bamber-O’Malley
- Years: 7–13
- Gender: Coeducational
- Enrolment: 608 (July 2026)
- Website: www.saintignatius.school.nz

St Ignatius of Loyola Catholic College is a Catholic co-educational secondary school in the Jesuit tradition, located in Burtt Rd, Drury, Auckland, New Zealand.

== Attributes ==
The college is a year 7 to 13 co-educational school. The school's proprietor is the Catholic Bishop of Auckland and it is a State-integrated school. The college commenced operations on 7 February 2024 with 340 students (years 7 to 9), and intended to grow progressively to 900 by 2028. The establishment of the school was the fruition of the long held dreams of building a school in the Jesuit tradition in service of the South Auckland community. The college was the second Catholic school with an "Ignatian charism" founded in New Zealand. The first was St Aloysius College in Dunedin which opened in 1878 and closed in 1883. St Ignatius of Loyola Catholic College primarily aims to provide Catholic secondary education for students who attended Holy Trinity Catholic Primary School, Takanini, St Mary’s Catholic School, Papakura or St Joseph’s School, Pukekohe.

== Funding ==
Part of the funding for the establishment of the school came from the Harold Plumley Endowment. Other sources of funding were a mixture of debt, land sales, and donations with final establishment cost being between $70m to $80m.

== Appointments and development ==
The first principal of the college, Dean Wearmouth, was appointed in 2022 and the deputy principals, Kane Raukura and Catherine Bamber-O’Malley were appointed later in that year. The planting of the campus commenced in 2022. Enrolments were called for the college's first year (2024) in early 2023 and closed at the end of March 2023 following a high demand for entrance into the school. The college opened with a Jesuit presence on the campus. Fr Michael Smith SJ and Fr Eka Tanaya SJ had been appointed and commenced their preparations in 2023. Father Tanaya was also appointed as a third deputy principal of the college. Father Smith worked part time at St Ignatius of Loyola College and part time at Holy Cross Seminary in Auckland. The school was designated as a Mass centre for its area.

== Opening ==
The College was opened by Bishop Lowe of Auckland on 7 February 2024 in the presence of local Iwi, supporters, friends, and students. A Pōwhiri was led by representatives from Ngāti Te Ata Waiohua and Ngāti Tamaoho. A mass was celebrated and the classroom crosses and the Statue of St. Ignatius of Loyola were blessed and a ribbon was cut officially opening the college.

== Increase ==
On Tuesday, 4 February 2025, St. Ignatius of Loyola Catholic College welcomed 130 new Year 7 ākonga (students) and staff with a formal Pōwhiri, conducted in accordance with Tainui tikanga. The school roll increased to about 470 students in 2025 and 613 students in 2026.

== Principals ==
- Dean Wearmouth (2022–2025) (establishment leader from 2022 and foundation principal 2024-2025)
- Catherine Bamber-O’Malley (2026- present)
