= Education in Colombia =

Education in Colombia includes nursery school, elementary school, high school, technical instruction and university education.

The Human Rights Measurement Initiative (HRMI) finds that Colombia is fulfilling only 80.5% of what it should be fulfilling for the right to education based on the country's level of income. HRMI breaks down the right to education by looking at the rights to both primary education and secondary education. While taking into consideration Colombia's income level, the nation is achieving 82.1% of what should be possible based on its resources (income) for primary education but only 78.9% for secondary education.

== Nursery school in Colombia ==
Most of the children over one year old are provided with daycare and nursery school in "Hogares Comunitarios" (community homes) sponsored by the National Institute for Family Welfare (ICBF acronym in Spanish), where mothers from the community take care of their own children, as well as the children from the immediate neighborhood. When children in Colombia learn how to read and write, they are usually transferred to the elementary school. There are also a large number of private kindergarten facilities.

== Elementary school ==
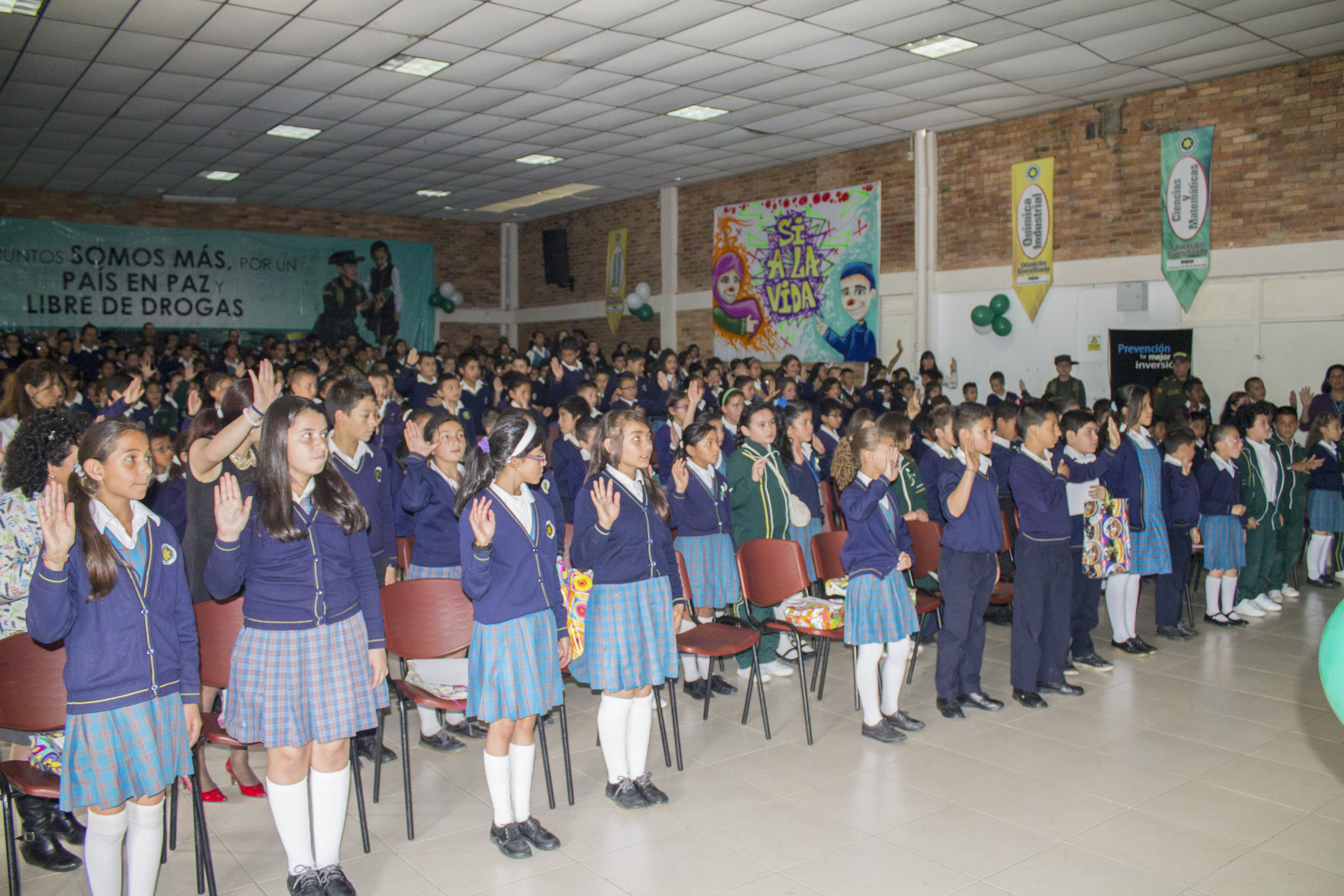
A public school in Bogotá

Elementary school comprises 5 years of formal education. Children usually enroll into grade 1, at age five. The net primary enrollment (percentage of relevant age-group) attending elementary school (primaria) in 2001 totaled 89.5 percent. In some rural areas, teachers are poorly qualified and dropout rates are high. In urban areas, on the other hand, teachers are generally well prepared and knowledgeable of their profession.

Colombia developed the method of teaching known as Escuela Nueva or “New School.” The method transforms the conventional learning paradigm where the teacher is the only one talking and conveying information in a classroom. The idea is that students are placed in the center of the learning process in rural communities. Decades after the model was first developed in 1975, Escuela Nueva has received support — including financial — from the Colombian government, Unesco, and The World Bank, and was implemented into a national educational policy in Colombia in the late 1980s. By 1988, Unesco declared that Colombia was the only country in Latin America and the Caribbean where rural schools outperformed urban schools because of the Escuela Nueva method. Between 2007 and 2009, the program taught 700,000 children in Colombia, and the model is now implemented in 20,000 schools across the country. Escuela Nueva has now expanded internationally to 17 countries, including Brazil, the Philippines and India, benefiting more than five million children.

== Secondary school ==
Secondary and fourth education is divided in basic secondary (grades 6 to 9) and mid secondary (grades 10 and 11). The upper-secondary education (usually beginning at the age of 15 or 16) offers many different "tracks", which all lead to their own "Bachiller" after a curriculum of two years. Out of the usual academic curriculum (Bachillerato Académico), the students can follow one of the following technical tracks (Bachillerato en Tecnología o Applicado): Industrial track (Bachillerato Industrial), Commercial track (Bachillerato Comercial), Pedagogical Track (Bachillerato Pedagógico), Agricultural Track (Bachillerato Agropecuario), social promotion track (Bachillerato de Promoción Social).

The "Bachiller" is required to continue into academic or professional higher Education. Nonetheless, technical and professional institutions of higher Education can also welcome students with a "qualification in Arts and business". This qualification is granted by the SENA after a two-year curriculum.

== University education ==
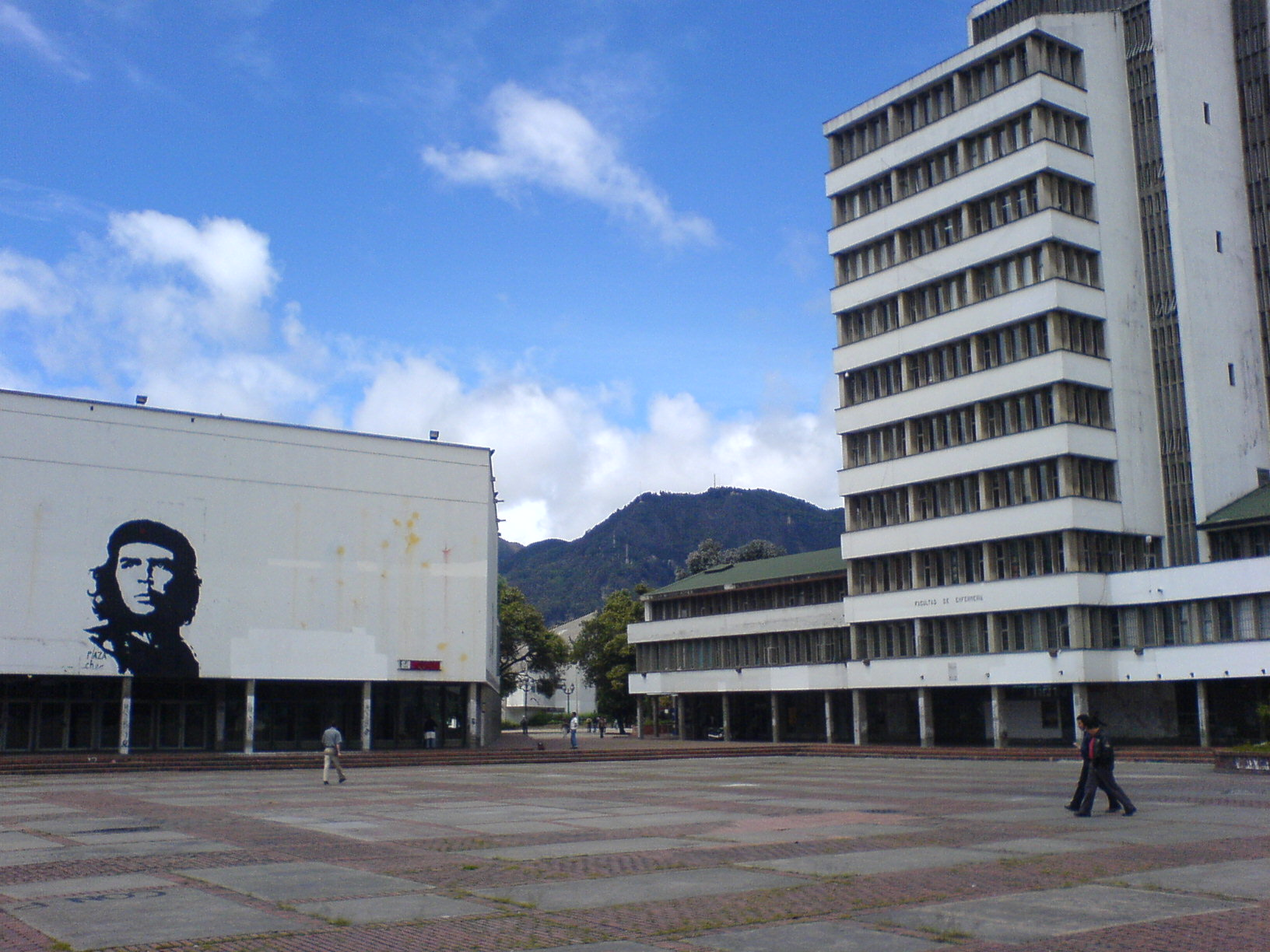
Ernesto "Che" Guevara Square or Francisco de Paula Santander Square, Universidad Nacional de Colombia, Bogotá

University education is divided into undergraduate and graduate degrees and is regulated by the 30th Law of 1992. Most of the university's degrees are 5 years long. Technical formation usually lasts 3 years. Graduate education includes specializations, master's, and Ph.D. programs. Admissions are done using grades obtained in the national school leaving exam Saber 11.

== Education for Employment and Human Development ==
Education for Employment and Human Development is regulated by law 1064 of 2006 and the 2888 decree of 2007. It provides a degree of technical education: skills and talents to improve the level of subsistence. Education for employment involves technical skills for work through the formation of "labor competences", which is a Colombian strategy to standardize and certify human resource, expanding and diversify the formation and training of human resources. It includes the education provided by the enterprises to their employees. The Colombian government promotes this kind of education as an alternative to university education, which is not accessible for the majority. Some institutions that provide this services are SENA (national service of learning), CESDE, ANDAP, and INCAP among others.

== Challenges ==
Two issues are identified among the main challenges of the public education in the country. On the one hand, 55% of children attending rural schools drop out before concluding their studies. Rural education represents 80% of the educational offer, with many isolated schools and some of them lacking electricity. A high rate of rural illiteracy is observed (average urban rate was 5.4% and rural 18.6%). On the other hand, the quality of education is a great concern. According to the OECD, the result from the PISA's test for Colombia in 2006 in Mathematics is below the ones obtained by 61 countries and similar to the countries that obtained the three lowest results.

== See also ==
- Ministry of National Education (Colombia)

== Sources ==
This article incorporates text from a free content work. Licensed under CC-BY-SA IGO 3.0 (license statement/permission). Text taken from Comparative review of National Mobile Learning Initiatives in Latin America: The cases of Costa Rica, Colombia, Peru and Uruguay. Comparative Report; Executive Summary/Abridged version, 7-8, UNESCO, UNESCO. UNESCO.
