= Catholic higher education =

Universities run by the Catholic Church

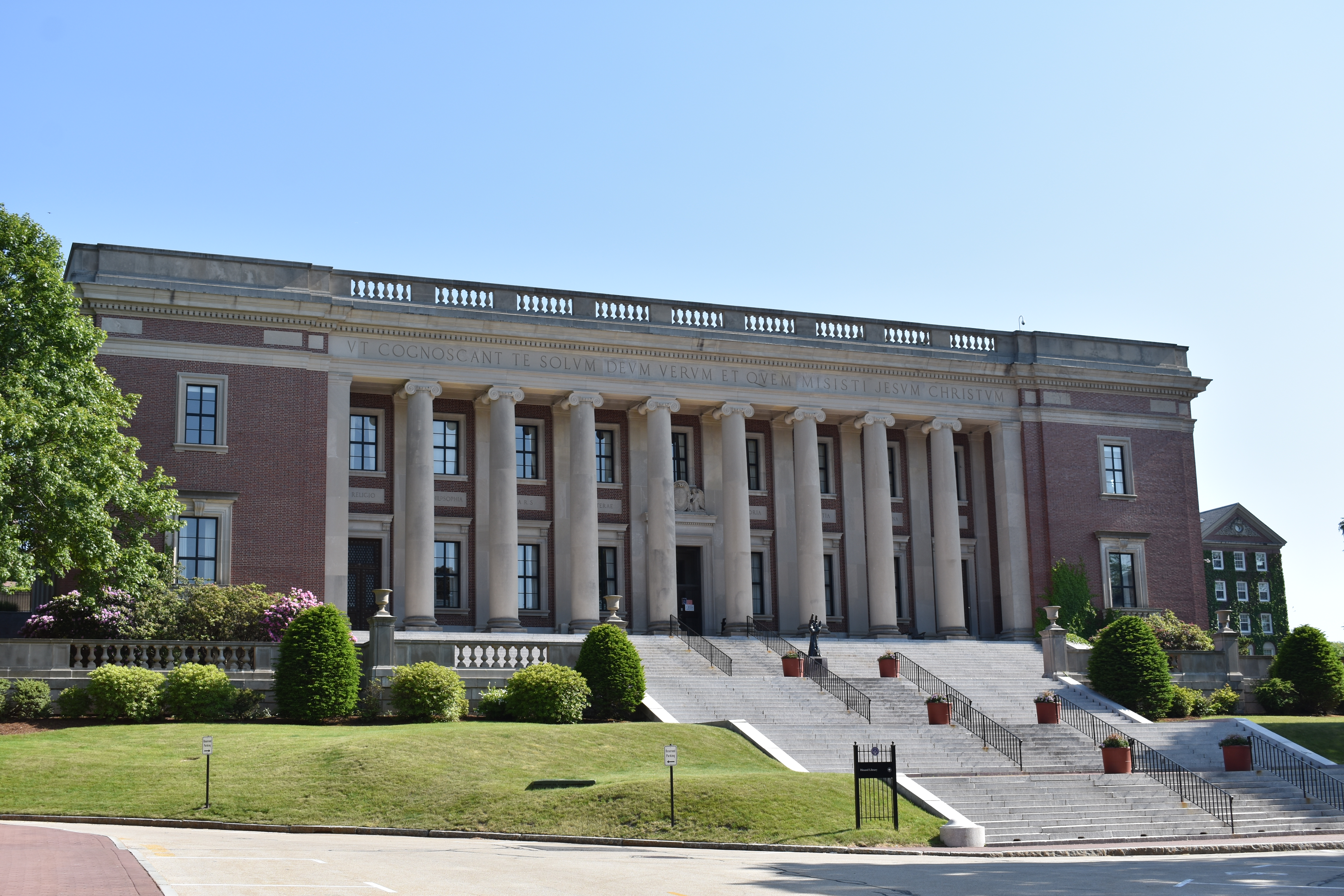
Dinand Library at the College of the Holy Cross in Worcester, Massachusetts, U.S.

Catholic higher education includes universities, colleges, and other institutions of higher education privately run by the Catholic Church, typically by religious institutes. Those tied to the Holy See are specifically called pontifical universities.

By definition, Catholic canon law states that "A Catholic school is understood to be one which is under control of the competent ecclesiastical authority or of a public ecclesiastical juridical person, or one which in a written document is acknowledged as Catholic by the ecclesiastical authority" (Can. 803). Although some schools are deemed "Catholic" because of their identity and a great number of students enrolled are Catholics, it is also stipulated in canon law that "no school, even if it is in fact Catholic, may bear the title 'Catholic school' except by the consent of the competent ecclesiastical authority" (Can. 803 §3). Some institutions are said to be "dependent" on the church.

The Dominican Order was "the first order instituted by the Church with an academic mission", founding studia conventualia in every convent of the order, and studia generalia at the early European universities such as the University of Bologna and the University of Paris. In Europe, most universities with medieval history were founded as Catholic. Many of them were rescinded to government authorities in modern times. Some, however, remained Catholic, while new ones were established alongside the public ones.

Like other private schools, Catholic universities and colleges are generally nondenominational, in that they accept anyone regardless of religious affiliation, nationality, ethnicity, or civil status, provided the admission or enrollment requirements and legal documents are submitted, and rules and regulations are obeyed for a fruitful life on campus. However, non-Catholics, whether Christian or not, may or may not participate in otherwise required campus activities, particularly those of a religious nature.

== History ==
The International Federation of Catholic Universities has its origins in 1924, in collaboration between the Università Cattolica del Sacro Cuore in Milan and the Catholic University of Nijmegen in the Netherlands. In 2023, it had 226 member universities in the world.

The Second Vatican Council's Declaration on Christian Education (1965), after setting out the Church's pronouncements on primary and secondary school education, outlined its "concern... also with schools of a higher level, especially colleges and universities", adding that "Catholic colleges and universities [should] be conveniently located in different parts of the world, but in such a way that they are outstanding not for their numbers but for their pursuit of knowledge".

== Purpose ==
The Declaration on Christian Education portrays its higher education institutions as places where students can form "a deeper realization of the harmony of faith and science". Within them, "there is accomplished a public, enduring and pervasive influence of the Christian mind in the furtherance of culture", and from them, students should emerge "truly outstanding in their training, ready to undertake weighty responsibilities in society and witness to the faith in the world".

== Global scale ==
The Catholic Church is the largest non-governmental provider of higher education in the world. Many of its institutions are internationally competitive. According to the census of the Vatican's Congregation for Catholic Education, the total number of Catholic universities and higher education institutions around the world is 1,358. On the other hand, the United States Conference of Catholic Bishops (USCCB) counts it at 1,861. The Catholic religious order with the highest number of universities around the world today is the Society of Jesus with 114.

== List of Catholic institutions of higher education ==
To prevent repetition, for Ecclesiastical universities and faculties, see Ecclesiastical university, and for Pontifical universities, see Pontifical university.

=== Albania ===
- Catholic University "Our Lady of Good Counsel", Tirana

=== Angola ===
- Catholic University of Angola, Luanda

=== Argentina ===
- Austral University, Buenos Aires
- Catholic University of Santiago del Estero, Santiago del Estero
- Facultades de Filosofía y Teología de San Miguel, San Miguel
- Pontifical Catholic University of Argentina, Buenos Aires
- Saint Thomas Aquinas University of the North, San Miguel de Tucumán
- Universidad Católica de Córdoba, Cordoba
- Universidad Católica de Cuyo, San Juan
- Universidad Católica de La Plata, La Plata
- Universidad Católica de Salta, Salta
- Universidad Católica de Santa Fe, Santa Fe
- Universidad del Salvador, Buenos Aires
- Universidad FASTA, Mar del Plata

=== Australia ===
- Australian Catholic University: seven campuses nationwide, including Sydney
- Campion College, Toongabbie, near Sydney
- Catholic Institute of Sydney, Strathfield
- University of Notre Dame Australia: campuses in Fremantle, Sydney, and Broome

=== Austria ===
- Benedict XVI Philosophical-Theological University, Heiligenkreuz
- Catholic Private University Linz, Linz
- Catholic University College of Education Graz, Graz; f.2007
- International Theological Institute, Trumau (near Wien)
- Pázmáneum, Wien
- Private University College of Education of the Diocese of Linz, Linz; f.1968
- University College of Teacher Education Edith Stein, Innsbruck
- University of Innsbruck Faculty of Catholic Theology, Innsbruck
- University of Salzburg Faculty of Catholic Theology, Salzburg
- University of Vienna Faculty of Catholic Theology, Wien

=== Bangladesh ===
- Notre Dame University Bangladesh, Dhaka

=== Belarus ===
- John the Baptist Catholic College, Minsk

=== Belgium ===
- Artevelde University of Applied Sciences, Ghent
- ICHEC Brussels Management School (Institut catholique des hautes études commerciales), Woluwe-Saint-Pierre
- Institut des hautes etudes des communications sociales (IHECS), Brussels
- Institut libre Marie Haps (ILMH), Ixelles
- Institut Saint-Luc, Saint-Gilles
- Karel de Grote University of Applied Sciences and Arts, Antwerp
- LUCA School of Arts, Brussels
- Saint Ignatius University Centre, Antwerp (UCSIA), Antwerp
- Saint-Louis University, Brussels, (Université Saint-Louis - Bruxelles), Brussels
- St John Berchmans University College, Heverlee, Heverlee
- University of Leuven (Katholieke Universiteit Leuven, KU Leuven), Leuven
  - Kulak (Katholieke Universiteit Leuven associatie Kortrijk), Kortrijk
- University of Louvain (Université catholique de Louvain, UC Louvain), Louvain-la-Neuve
  - UCLouvain FUCaM Mons (Facultés universitaires catholiques de Mons), Mons
- University of Namur (Université de Namur, UNamur), Namur

=== Belize ===
- John Paul the Great College, Benque Viejo del Carmen
- St. John's College, Belize, Belize City

=== Benin ===
- Université Catholique de l'Afrique de l'Ouest, Cotonou

=== Bolivia ===
- Luis Espinal Higher Institute of Philosophy and Humanities, Cochabamba
- Unidad Académica Campesina-Carmen Pampa, Carmen Pampa; a satellite campus of the Catholic University of Bolivia
- Universidad Católica Boliviana, La Paz
- Universidad Católica Boliviana Cochabamba; Unidad Académica Regional Cochabamba
- Universidad Católica Boliviana Santa Cruz; Unidad Académica Regional Santa Cruz
- Universidad Católica Boliviana Tarija; Unidad Académica Regional Tarija
- Universidad La Salle Bolivia, La Paz
- Universidad Loyola de Bolivia, La Paz
- Universidad Salesiana de Bolivia, La Paz
- University of San Francisco Xavier, Sucre

=== Brazil ===
- Católica de Vitória Centro Universitário, Vitória, ES
- Centro Universitário Católica de Santa Catarina, Jaraguá do Sul, SC
- Centro Universitário Católico do Sudoeste do Paraná, Palmas, PR
- Centro Universitário Claretiano, Batatais, SP
- Centro Universitário da FEI, São Bernardo do Campo, SP
- Centro Universitário Franciscano, Santa Maria, RS
- Centro Universitário São Camilo, Ipiranga, SP
- Faculdade Católica do Tocantins, Palmas, TO
- Faculdade La Salle, Manaus, AM
- Institutos Supereriores de Ensino La Salle, Niteroi, RJ
- La Salle College of Lucas do Rio Verde, Lucas do Rio Verde, MT
- Pontifical Catholic University of Campinas, Campinas
- Pontifical Catholic University of Goiás, Goiânia
- Pontifical Catholic University of Minas Gerais, Belo Horizonte
- Pontifical Catholic University of São Paulo, São Paulo
- Pontifical Catholic University of Paraná, Curitiba
- Pontifical Catholic University of Rio de Janeiro, Rio de Janeiro
- Pontifical Catholic University of Rio Grande do Sul, Porto Alegre
- Universidade Católica de Brasília, Brasília, DF
- Universidade Católica de Pelotas, Pelotas, RS
- Universidade Católica de Pernambuco, Recife, PE
- Universidade Católica de Petrópolis, Petropolis, RJ
- Universidade Católica de Santos, Santos, SP
- Universidade Católica do Salvador, Salvador, BA
- Universidade Católica Dom Bosco, Campo Grande, MS
- Universidade da Amazônia, Belem, PA
- Universidade do Sagrado Coração, Bauru, SP
- Universidade do Vale do Rio dos Sinos, São Leopoldo, RS
- Universidade La Salle, Canoas, RS
- Universidade Santa Úrsula, Rio de Janeiro, RJ
- Universidade São Francisco, Bragança Paulista, SP
- University of Vale do Paraíba, São José dos Campos, SP

=== Burkina Faso ===
- Université Catholique de l'Afrique de l'Ouest (UCAO) - Unité Universitaire de Bobo-Dioulasso, Bobo-Dioulasso
- Saint Thomas Aquinas University in Ouagadougou (Université Saint Thomas d'Aquin; USTA), Ouagadougou

=== Burundi ===
- Olivia University Bujumbura, Bujumbura

=== Cambodia ===
- Saint Paul Institute (SPI), Tram Kak District

=== Cameroon ===
- Catholic University Institute of Buea, Buea
- Catholic University of Cameroon, Bamenda
- Catholic University of Central Africa, Yaoundé
- Saint Monica University, Buea

=== Canada ===
Public universities that claim Catholic affiliation

- Mount Saint Vincent University, Halifax, Nova Scotia
- Saint Mary's University, Halifax, Nova Scotia
- St. Francis Xavier University, Antigonish, Nova Scotia
- St. Thomas University, Fredericton, New Brunswick
- Université de Montréal, Montreal, Quebec
- Université de Sherbrooke, Sherbrooke, Quebec
- Université Laval, Quebec City, Quebec
- Université Sainte-Anne, Pointe-de-l'Église, Nova Scotia

Catholic institutions affiliated or federated to public universities

- Assumption University, Windsor, Ontario (University of Windsor)
- Brescia University College, London, Ontario (University of Western Ontario)
- Campion College, Regina, Saskatchewan (University of Regina)
- Corpus Christi College, Vancouver, British Columbia (University of British Columbia)
- Dominican University College, Ottawa, Ontario (Carleton University)
- King's University College, London, Ontario (University of Western Ontario)
- Regis College, Toronto, Ontario (University of Toronto)
- Saint Paul University, Ottawa, Ontario (University of Ottawa)
- St. Jerome's University, Waterloo, Ontario (University of Waterloo)
- St. Joseph's College, Edmonton, Alberta (University of Alberta)
- St. Mark's College, Vancouver, British Columbia (University of British Columbia)
- St. Michael's College, Toronto, Ontario (University of Toronto)
- St. Paul's College, Fort Garry, Manitoba (University of Manitoba)
- St. Thomas More College, Saskatoon, Saskatchewan (University of Saskatchewan)
- Université de Saint-Boniface, Winnipeg, Manitoba (University of Manitoba)

Private Catholic universities

- Catholic Pacific College, Langley, British Columbia
- Newman Theological College, Edmonton, Alberta
- Our Lady Seat of Wisdom College, Barry's Bay, Ontario
- St. Mary's University, Calgary, Alberta

=== Central African Republic ===
- Catholic University Center (Centre Catholique Universitaire; CCU), Bangui

=== Chile ===
- Academy of Christian Humanism University, Santiago
- Alberto Hurtado University, Santiago
- Catholic University of the Holy Conception, Concepcion
- Catholic University of the Maule, Talca
- Catholic University of the North, Antofagasta
- Pontifical Catholic University of Chile, Santiago
- Pontifical Catholic University of Valparaíso, Valparaiso
- Silva Henríquez Catholic University, Santiago
- Temuco Catholic University, Temuco
- Universidad Finis Terrae, Santiago
- Universidad Santo Tomás, Santiago & many campuses
- University of the Andes, Chile, Santiago

=== Colombia ===
- Augustinian University (Uniagustiniana), Bogotá
- Catholic University of Colombia, Bogotá
- Corporación Universitaria Lasallista, Caldas
- Del Rosario University, Bogotá; f. 1653
- Fundación Universitaria Católica Lumen Gentium, Cali
- La Salle University, Colombia, Bogotá
- Luis Amigó Catholic University, Medellín
- Minuto de Dios University Corporation, Bogotá
- Pontifical Bolivarian University, Medellín
- Pontifical Xavierian University, Bogotá
- Saint Martin University, Bogotá
- Saint Thomas Aquinas University, Bogotá
- Sergio Arboleda University, Bogotá
- Universidad Católica de Manizales, Manizales
- Universidad Católica da Pereira, Pereira
- Universidad Católica de Oriente, Rionegro (near Medellín)
- Universidad CESMAG, San Juan de Pasto
- Universidad de San Buenaventura: 4 campuses, including Bogotá
- Universidad Mariana, Pasto
- University of La Sabana, Chía

=== Congo, Democratic Republic of ===
- Académie des Beaux-Arts, Kinshasa
- Catholic University of Graben, Butembo
- Loyola University of Congo, Kinshasa
- Marist University of Congo, Kisangani
- Mazenod University (Université De Mazenod), Kinshasa
- Université Catholique de Bukavu, Bukavu
- Université Catholique du Congo, Kinshasa
- Université Catholique la Sapientia de Goma, Goma
- Université de l'Assomption, Butembo
- Université de l'Uélé, Isiro
- Université Notre Dame du Kasayi, Kananga
- University of Cardinal Malula, Kinshasa

=== Congo, Republic of ===
- Higher Institute of Technology of Central Africa (IST-AC), Pointe Noire & Douala

=== Costa Rica ===
- Universidad Católica de Costa Rica, San José; f.1993
- Universidad de La Salle, San José; f.1994
- Universidad Juan Pablo II, San José; f.1996

=== Croatia ===
- Catholic Faculty of Theology, University of Zagreb, Zagreb
- Catholic University of Croatia, Zagreb; f.2005
- Faculty of Philosophy and Religious Sciences, Zagreb
- University of Split Faculty of Catholic Theology, Split

=== Cuba ===
- Universidad Católica de Santo Tomás de Villanueva, Havana

=== Czech Republic ===
- Catholic Theological Faculty, Charles University in Prague, Prague
- Palacký University of Olomouc Saint Cyril and Methodius Faculty of Theology, Olomouc
- University of South Bohemia in České Budějovice, Faculty of Theology, České Budějovice (Budweis)

=== Dominican Republic ===
- Instituto Politécnico Loyola, San Cristobal
- Pontificia Universidad Catolica Madre y Maestra, Santo Domingo
- Universidad Católica del Este, Higüey
- Universidad Católica Nordestana, San Francisco de Macoris
- Universidad Católica Santo Domingo, Santo Domingo
- Universidad Católica Tecnológica del Cibao, La Vega

=== Ecuador ===
- Politecnica Salesiana University, Cuenca
- Pontificia Universidad Católica del Ecuador, Quito
- Universidad Católica de Cuenca, Cuenca
- Universidad Católica de Santiago de Guayaquil, Guayaquil
- Universidad de Los Hemisferios, Quito
- Universidad Técnica Particular de Loja (La Universidad Católica de Loja), Loja

=== El Salvador ===
- Universidad Católica de El Salvador, Santa Ana
- Universidad Centroamericana, San Salvador
- Universidad Don Bosco, Soyapango

=== Ethiopia ===
- Ethiopian Catholic University - La Salle (ECUL), Addis Ababa
- Ethiopian Catholic University of St. Thomas Aquinas (ECUSTA), Addis Ababa

=== France ===
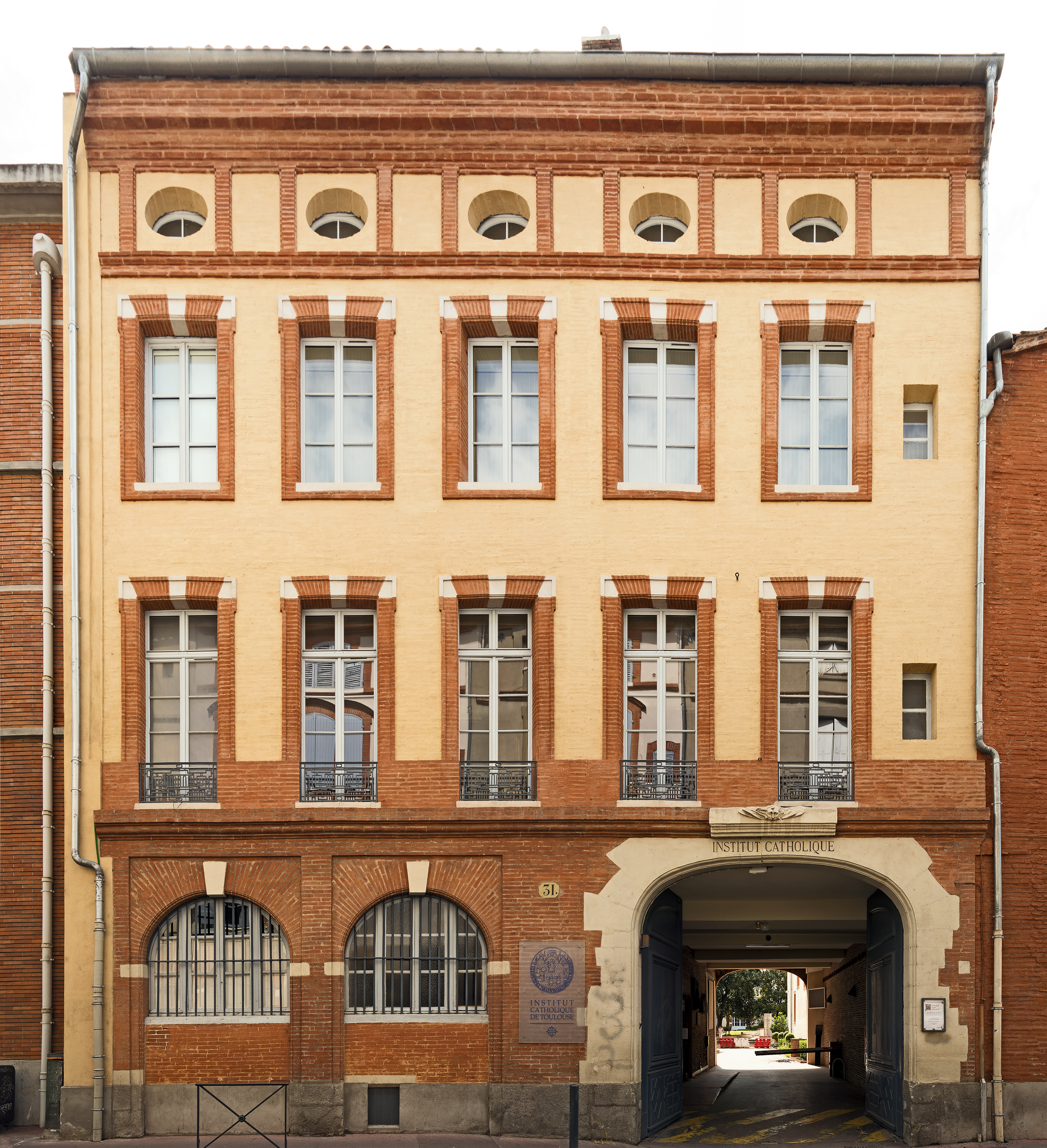
Catholic University of Toulouse, Toulouse, France

- Catholic Institute of Higher Studies - ICES (Institut Catholique d'Etudes Supérieures), La Roche-sur-Yon
- Catholic University of Lyon, Lyon
- Catholic University of Rennes, Rennes
- Catholic University of the West, Angers
- Catholic University of Toulouse, Toulouse
- Centre Sèvres, Paris; Jesuit institution
- Chavagnes Studium, Chavagnes en Paillers; Anglophone Liberal Arts Centre
- Collège des Bernardins (Faculté Notre-Dame), Paris
- ECAM Rennes - Louis de Broglie, Bruz, near Rennes
- École catholique des arts et métiers (ECAM), Lyon
- École supérieure des sciences économiques et commerciales (ESSEC Business School), Cergy-Pontoise
- Institut catholique d'arts et métiers (ICAM), Lille & 5 cities
- Institut Catholique de Paris, Paris
- Institut supérieur d'électronique de Paris, Paris
- Unilasalle (Institut Polytechnique UniLaSalle), Beauvais & Rouen
- Université Catholique de Lille, Lille
- University of Strasbourg Faculty of Catholic Theology, Strasbourg

=== Georgia ===
- Sulkhan-Saba Orbeliani University, Tbilisi

=== Germany ===
- Catholic University of Applied Sciences Berlin (KHSB), Berlin
- Catholic University of Applied Sciences Freiburg (KH Freiburg), Freiburg
- Catholic University of Applied Sciences Mainz (KH Mainz), Mainz
- Catholic University of Applied Sciences Munich (KSH München), Munich
- Catholic University of Applied Sciences North Rhine-Westphalia (KatHO NW), Cologne & Münster
- Catholic University of Eichstätt-Ingolstadt, Eichstätt & Ingolstadt
- Faculty of Roman-Catholic Theology, University of Tübingen, Tübingen
- Munich School of Philosophy, Munich
- Sankt Georgen Graduate School of Philosophy and Theology, Frankfurt
- University of Freiburg Faculty of Theology, Freiburg

=== Ghana ===
- Catholic Institute of Business and Technology, Accra, affiliated to the University of Ghana
- Catholic University College of Ghana, Fiapre
- Spiritan University College, Ejisu

=== Guatemala ===
- Rafael Landívar University, Guatemala City
- Universidad de San Carlos de Guatemala, Guatemala City; f.1676
- Universidad del Istmo, Fraijanes
- Universidad Mesoamericana, Guatemala City

=== Haiti ===
- University Notre Dame of Haiti (Université Notre Dame d'Haïti), Port-au-Prince

=== Honduras ===
- Universidad Católica de Honduras, Tegucigalpa and various other campuses throughout the country

=== Hong Kong ===
- Saint Francis University (Hong Kong), Hong Kong; formerly Caritas Institute of Higher Education

=== Hungary ===
- Apor Vilmos Catholic College, Vác
- Eszterhazy Karoly Catholic University, Eger
- Pázmány Péter Catholic University, Budapest
- Saint Ignatius Jesuit College of Excellence, Budapest

=== India ===
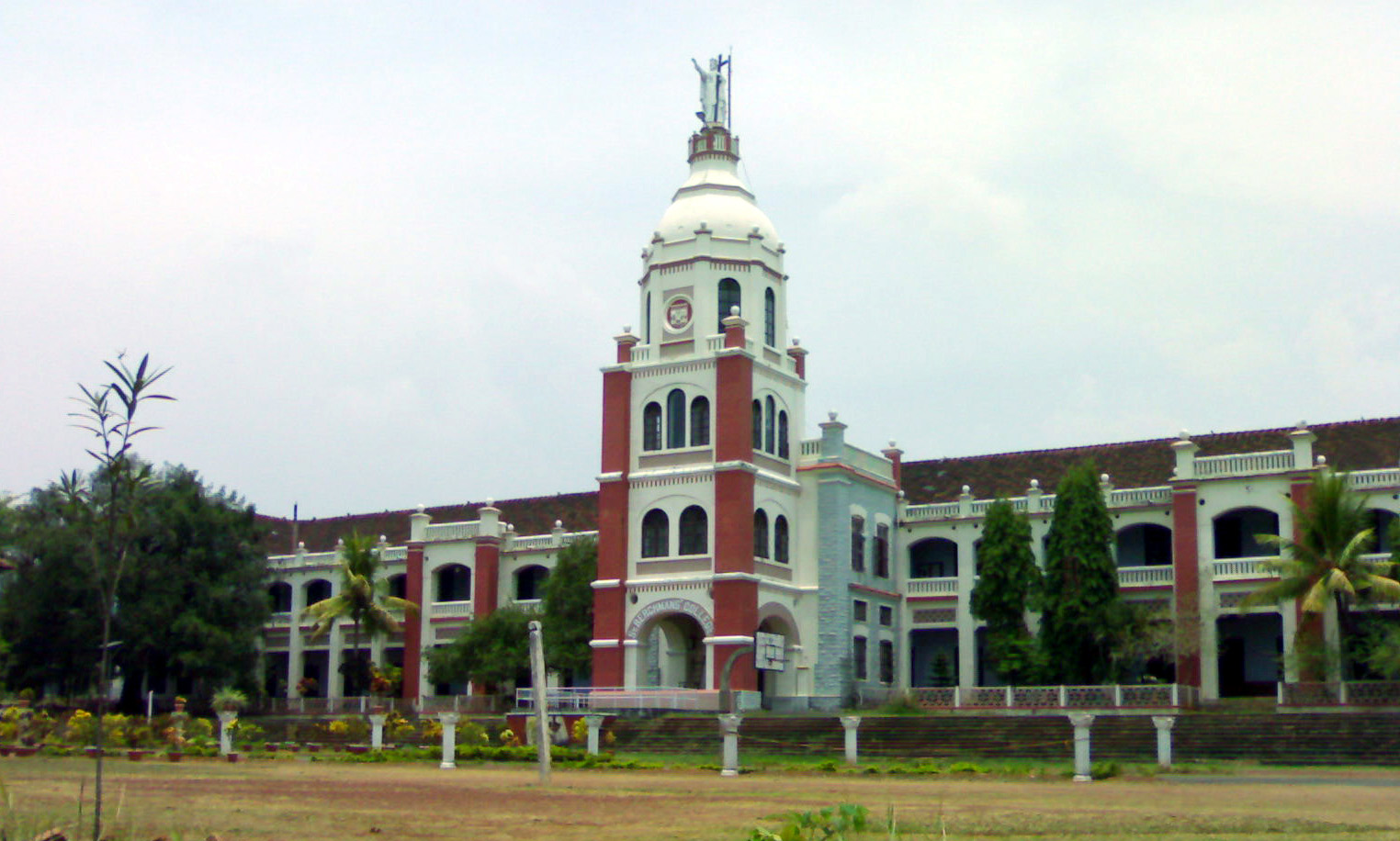
St. Berchmans College in Changanassery, one of the prominent Catholic institutions in Kerala, India.

As of fall 2004, there are 291 Catholic colleges and universities in India. Among them are the following:

==== Pontifical Athenaeum ====
- Dharmaram Vidya Kshetram

==== Pontifical Institute ====
- Jnana Deepa, Institute of Philosophy and Theology
- St Peters Pontifical Institute
- Vidyajyoti College of Theology

==== Secular Universities and Colleges ====
- Assam Don Bosco University, Guwahati
- Christ University, Bangalore
- De Paul Institute of Science & Technology (DIST), Angamaly
- Don Bosco Institute of Technology, Mumbai, Mumbai
- Father Muller Medical College, Mangalore
- Jesus and Mary College, New Delhi
- Jubilee Mission Medical College and Research Institute, Thrissur
- Jyoti Nivas College, Bangalore
- Loyola College, Chennai, Chennai
- Loyola-ICAM College of Engineering and Technology, Chennai
- Mount Carmel College, Bengaluru, Bangalore
- Malankara Catholic College, Mariagiri, Marthandam
- Pushpagiri Medical College, Thiruvalla
- Sathyabama University, Chennai
- St. Berchmans College, Changanassery; with three Cardinals of the Catholic Church among its alumni
- St. Francis Institute of Technology, Mumbai
- St. John's Medical College, Bangalore
- St. Joseph University, Chümoukedima, Nagaland
- St. Joseph's University, Bangalore, Bangalore
- St. Joseph's College of Commerce, Bangalore
- St. Joseph's Institute of Management, Bengaluru, Bangalore
- St Joseph's College of Law, Bengaluru, Bangalore
- St. Xavier's College, Calcutta, Kolkata; f.1860
- St. Xavier's College, Mumbai, Mumbai; f.1869
- St. Xavier's University, Kolkata, Kolkata
- Xavier Institute of Engineering, Mumbai
- XIM University, Bhubaneswar

=== Indonesia ===
- Atma Jaya Catholic University of Indonesia, Jakarta; 8 schools including School of Medicine
- Catholic University of Saint Thomas, Medan
- De La Salle Catholic University, Manado, Manado
- Mechatronics Polytechnic of Sanata Dharma, Yogyakarta
- Parahyangan Catholic University, Bandung; oldest Catholic University in Indonesia, f.1955.
- Polytechnic ATMI Surakarta, Surakarta
- Sanata Dharma University, Yogyakarta
- Sekolah Tinggi Filsafat Pineleng, Manado
- Soegijapranata Catholic University (Unika Soegijapranata), Semarang
- Universitas Atma Jaya Makassar, Makassar
- Universitas Atma Jaya Yogyakarta, Yogyakarta
- Widya Karya Catholic University, Malang
- Widya Mandala Catholic University, Surabaya
- Widya Mandira Catholic University, Kupang

=== Iraq ===
- Catholic University in Erbil, Ankawa-Erbil

=== Ireland ===
- All Hallows College, Dublin; Dublin City University All Hallows Campus
- Catholic University of Ireland, Dublin; became National University of Ireland
- Marino Institute of Education, Dublin
- Mary Immaculate College, Limerick; a college of the University of Limerick
- St. Patrick's, Carlow College, Carlow
- St. Patrick's College, Thurles, now MIC St. Patrick's Thurles Campus
- St Patrick's Pontifical University, Maynooth, Maynooth
- The Priory Institute, Tallaght; Dominican institution, validated by Technological University of Dublin

=== Israel ===
- École Biblique, Jerusalem
- Studium Biblicum Franciscanum, Jerusalem
- Studium Theologicum Salesianum, Ratisbonne Monastery, Jerusalem
- Tantur Ecumenical Institute, Jerusalem

=== Italy ===
See also Vatican

- European University of Rome (UER), Roma; Legionaries of Christ
- John Felice Rome Center, Roma
- Libera Università Maria SS. Assunta (LUMSA), Roma
- Pontifical Faculty of Theology of Sardinia, Cagliari
- St. John's University (Italy), Roma; Vincentian Fathers
- Studium Generale Marcianum, Venezia
- Università Campus Bio-Medico, Roma; Opus Dei
- Università Cattolica del Sacro Cuore, Milano & Roma
- Vita-Salute San Raffaele University (Università Vita-Salute San Raffaele), Milano

=== Ivory Coast (Côte d'Ivoire) ===
- Université Catholique de l'Afrique de l'Ouest, Abidjan

=== Jamaica ===
- Catholic College of Mandeville, Manchester Parish
- Saint Joseph's Teachers' College, Kingston

=== Japan ===
- Elisabeth University of Music, Hiroshima
- Fuji Women's University, Sapporo
- Kagoshima Immaculate Heart University, Satsumasendai
- Kyoto Notre Dame University, Kyoto
- Nagasaki Junshin Catholic University, Nagasaki
- Nanzan University, Nagoya
- Notre Dame Seishin University, Okayama
- St. Catherine University, Matsuyama
- St. Marianna University School of Medicine, Kawasaki
- St. Mary's College (Japan), Kurume
- St. Thomas University, Japan, Amagasaki
- Seisen Jogakuin College, Nagano
- Seisen University, Tokyo
- Sendai Shirayuri Women's College, Sendai
- Shirayuri University, Tokyo
- Sophia University, Tokyo
- Tenshi College, Sapporo
- Tokyo Junshin University, Tokyo
- University of the Sacred Heart, Tokyo

=== Jordan ===
- American University of Madaba, Madaba

=== Kenya ===
- Catholic University of Eastern Africa, Nairobi
- Hekima University College, Nairobi; Jesuit
- Regina Pacis University College, Nairobi
- Strathmore University, Nairobi
- Tangaza University, Nairobi
- Uzima University College, Kisumu
- Consolata International University, Nairobi

=== Korea ===
- Catholic Kkottongnae University, Cheongju
- Catholic Kwandong University, Gangneung
- Catholic Sangji College, Andong
- Catholic University of Daegu, Daegu
- Catholic University of Pusan, Pusan
- Daejeon Catholic University, Sejong City
- Gwangju Catholic University, Naju
- Incheon Catholic University, Incheon
- Mokpo Catholic University, Mokpo
- Sogang University, Seoul
- Suwon Catholic University, Hwaseong, Gyeonggi
- The Catholic University of Korea, Seoul & Bucheon

=== Lebanon ===
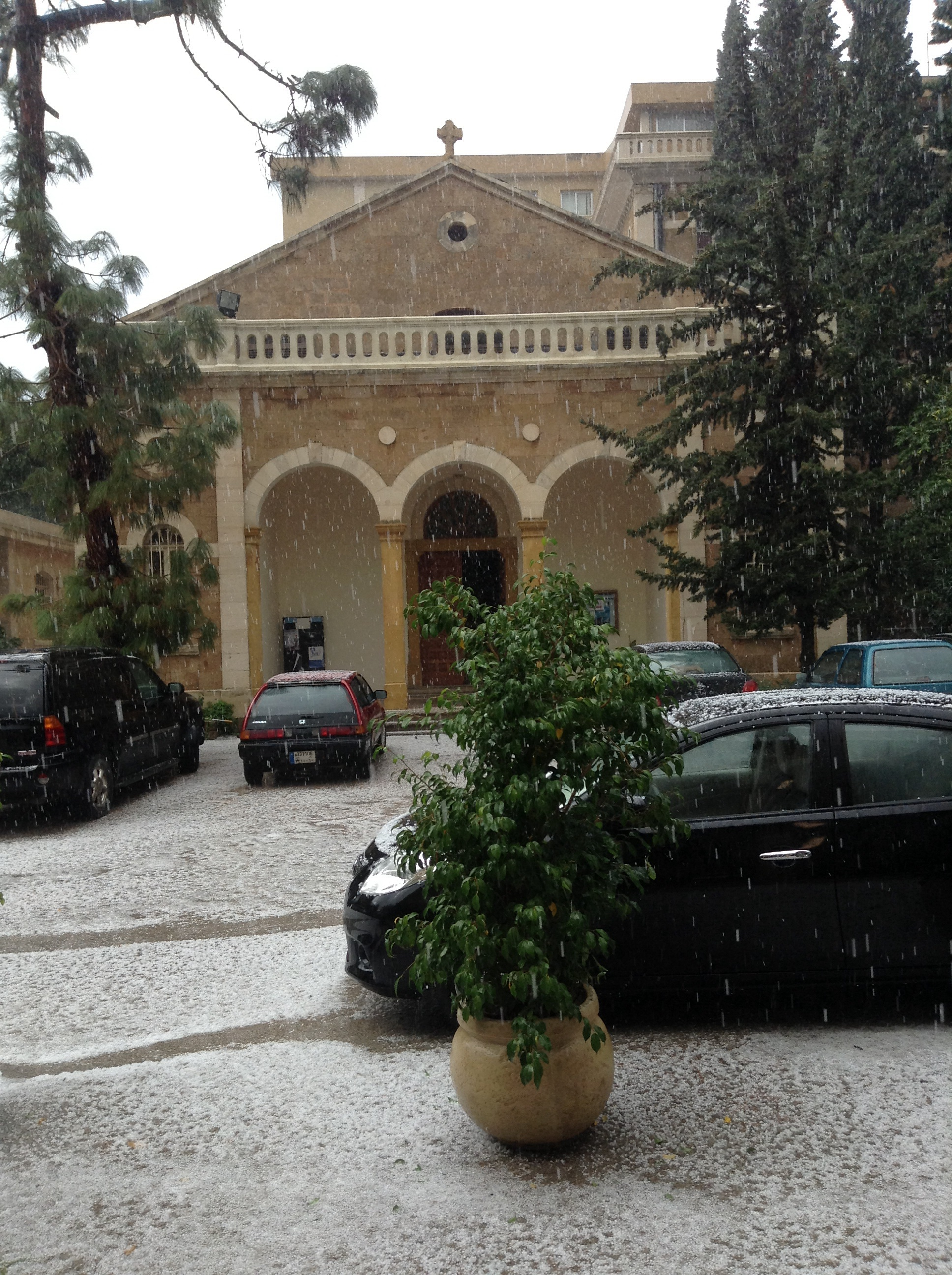
Chapel of the faculty of medicine of Saint Joseph University, Beirut, Lebanon

- Antonine University, Baabda
- College La Sagesse St Joseph - Ashrafieh, Beirut
- Notre Dame University - Louaize, Zouk Mosbeh
- Saint Joseph University, Beirut
- Université La Sagesse, Furn-El-Chebak
- Université Saint-Esprit de Kaslik, Kaslik
- Université Sainte Famille, Batroun

=== Liberia ===
- Stella Maris Polytechnic University, Monrovia

=== Lithuania ===
- St. Ignatius of Loyola University of Applied Sciences, Kaunas
- Vytautas Magnus University Faculty of Catholic Theology, Kaunas

=== Luxembourg ===
- Sacred Heart University Luxembourg, Luxembourg City

=== Macau ===
- University of Saint Joseph (Portuguese: Universidade de São José), Macau; formerly Macau Inter-University Institute

=== Madagascar ===
- Catholic University of Madagascar, Antananarivo
- Ecole Professionnelle Supérieure Agricole Bevalala, Antananarivo
- Saint Michael Higher Technical Institute, Amparibe, Antananarivo
- SAMIS-ESIC School of Information and Communication, Amparibe

=== Malawi ===
- Catholic University of Malawi, Montfort
- DMI - St. John the Baptist University, Mangochi

=== Malta ===
- University of Malta Faculty of Theology, Msida

=== Mexico ===
- Ateneo de Monterrey University, Monterrey
- Ibero-American University of Torreón, Torreón
- Ibero-American University Tijuana, Tijuana
- Intercultural Institute of Ayuuk, Oaxaca
- ITESO, Guadalajara; Jesuit university
- Loyola University of the Pacific, Acapulco
- Marist University of Querétaro, Querétaro
- Montolinia del Pedregal University, Ciudad de México
- Pontifical University of Mexico, Ciudad de México
- Simón Bolívar University (Mexico), Ciudad de México
- Tamaulipas Institute of Higher Education, Altamira
- Universidad Anáhuac Cancún, Cancún
- Universidad Anáhuac del Sur, Ciudad de México
- Universidad Anáhuac Mayab, Mérida
- Universidad Anáhuac México Norte, Huixquilucan
- Universidad Anahuac Oaxaca, Oaxaca
- Universidad Anáhuac San Andrés Cholula, Puebla
- Universidad Autónoma de Guadalajara, Guadalajara
- Universidad Bonaterra, Aguascalientes
- Universidad Catolica Lumen Gentium, Ciudad de Mexico
- Universidad de Monterrey, Monterrey
- Universidad del Valle, Ciudad de México
- Universidad del Valle de Atemajac, Zapopan
- Universidad Iberoamericana, Ciudad de México
- Universidad Iberoamericana León, León
- Universidad Iberoamericana Puebla, San Andrés Cholula
- Universidad Incarnate Word, Ciudad de Mexico & Irapuato
- Universidad Intercontinental, Ciudad de México
- Universidad La Salle, Ciudad de México
- Universidad La Salle Chihuahua (La Salle University of Chihuahua), Chihuahua
- Universidad La Salle Noroeste, Ciudad Obregón
- Universidad La Salle Saltillo, Saltillo
- Universidad La Salle Victoria, Ciudad Victoria
- Universidad La Salle Laguna, Gómez Palacio
- Universidad La Salle Cuernavaca, Cuernavaca
- Universidad La Salle Pachuca, Pachuca
- Universidad La Salle Oaxaca, Santa Cruz Xoxocotlán
- Universidad La Salle Benavente, Puebla
- Universidad La Salle Bajío, León - Celaya - San Francisco del Rincon
- Universidad La Salle Nezahuelcóyotl, Ciudad Nezahualcóyotl
- Universidad La Salle Morelia, Morelia
- Universidad La Salle Cancún, Cancún
- Universidad Panamericana, Ciudad de México
- Universidad Popular Autónoma del Estado de Puebla, Puebla City
- Universidad Salesiana México, Ciudad de México
- Vasco de Quiroga University, Morelia

=== Montenegro ===
- Pontifical Catholic University of Montenegro, Kotor

=== Mozambique ===
- Catholic University of Mozambique (Universidade Católica de Moçambique), Beira
- Holy Family Pedagogical University, Maxixe
- St. Thomas University of Mozambique, Maputo

=== Nepal ===
- St. Xavier's College, Kathmandu

=== Netherlands ===
- KPZ University of Applied Sciences (Katholieke Pabo Zwolle), Zwolle
- Radboud University Nijmegen, Nijmegen; non ex corde
- Tilburg University, Tilburg

=== New Zealand ===
- Catholic Institute of Aotearoa New Zealand, Wellington
- Good Shepherd College, Auckland

=== Nicaragua ===
- Catholic University of Dry Tropic Farming and Livestock, Estelí
- Catholic University Redemptoris Mater, Managua
- Central American University (Managua), Managua
- Thomas More Universitas, Managua
- Universidad La Anunciata, Rivas
- Universidad Internacional Antonio de Valdivieso, Rivas
- Universidad Juan Pablo II, Managua
- Universidad Tecnológica La Salle, León

=== Nigeria ===
- Augustine University Ilara, Epe
- Ave Maria University, Piyanko, Nasarawa State
- Caritas University, Amorji-Nike
- Catholic Institute of West Africa, Port Harcourt
- Catholic University of Nigeria (Veritas University), Abuja
- Dominican University Ibadan, Ibadan
- Godfrey Okoye University, Enugu
- Gregory University, Uturu
- Madonna University, Ihiala
- Our Saviour Institute of Science and Technology, Enugu
- Pan-Atlantic University, Lagos
- Spiritan University, Umunneochi

=== Pakistan ===
- Notre Dame Institute of Education, Karachi
- Sargodha Institute of Technology, Sargodha

=== Palestine ===
- Bethlehem University, Bethlehem

=== Panama ===
- Universidad Católica Santa María La Antigua, Panama City
- Universidad de Cartago, David, Chiriquí

=== Papua New Guinea ===
- Divine Word University, Madang

=== Paraguay ===
- Higher Institute of Humanistic and Philosophical Studies, Asuncion
- Universidad Católica Nuestra Señora de la Asunción, Asuncion

=== Peru ===
- Antonio Ruiz de Montoya University (UARM), Lima
- Catholic University Los Angeles of Chimbote, Chimbote
- Catholic University of Santa María, Arequipa
- Catholic University of Trujillo, Trujillo
- Pontifical Catholic University of Peru, Lima
- Universidad Católica de San Pablo, Arequipa
- Universidad Católica Santo Toribio de Mogrovejo, Lambayeque
- Universidad Católica Sedes Sapientiae (UCSS), Lima
- Universidad de San Martín de Porres, Lima
- Universidad Femenina del Sagrado Corazón, Lima
- Universidad San Ignacio de Loyola, Lima
- University of the Pacific, Lima
- University of Piura, Piura & Lima

=== Philippines ===
There are more than 40 universities — besides many colleges — in the Philippine Catholic Church. Among these, some universities are:

- Adamson University, Manila
- Angeles University Foundation, Angeles City
- Ateneo de Davao University, Davao City
- Ateneo de Manila University, Quezon City
- Ateneo de Zamboanga University, Zamboanga City
- De La Salle Araneta University, Malabon
- De La Salle University, Manila
- De La Salle University – Dasmariñas, Cavite
- Holy Angel University, Angeles City
- La Salle University, Ozamiz
- Saint Louis University (Philippines), Baguio City
- St. Paul University Manila, Manila
- St. Paul University Quezon City, Quezon City
- University of Saint Louis Tuguegarao, Cagayan
- University of San Carlos, Cebu City
- University of San Jose – Recoletos, Cebu City
- University of Santo Tomas, Manila
- University of Santo Tomas - Legazpi, Albay

=== Poland ===
- Cardinal Stefan Wyszyński University in Warsaw, Warsaw
- Jesuit University of Philosophy and Education Ignatianum, Kraków
- John Paul II Catholic University of Lublin, Lublin
- Pontifical Faculty of Theology in Warsaw, Warsaw
- Pontifical Faculty of Theology in Wrocław, Wrocław
- Pontifical University of John Paul II, Kraków
- University of Opole Faculty of Theology, Opole

cf. In Poland also work faculties of theology in some public universities.

=== Portugal ===
- Catholic University of Portugal, Lisbon & Porto, Braga, Viseu
- Paula Frassinetti-Superior School of Education, Porto

=== Puerto Rico ===
- Bayamon Central University, Bayamon
- Pontifical Catholic University of Puerto Rico, Ponce
- University of the Sacred Heart, Santurce (San Juan)

=== Qatar ===
- Georgetown University in Qatar, Education City

=== Romania ===
- Jesuit Academy of Kolozsvár, Cluj-Napoka
- Roman Catholic Theological Institute of Iaşi, Iaşi

=== Rwanda ===
- Catholic University of Rwanda, Butare
- Université Catholique de Kabgayi, Muhanga

=== Senegal ===
- Université Catholique de l'Afrique de l'Ouest - Unité universitaire à Dakar

=== Sierra Leone ===
- University of Makeni, Makeni

=== Singapore ===
- LASALLE College of the Arts, Singapore

=== Slovakia ===
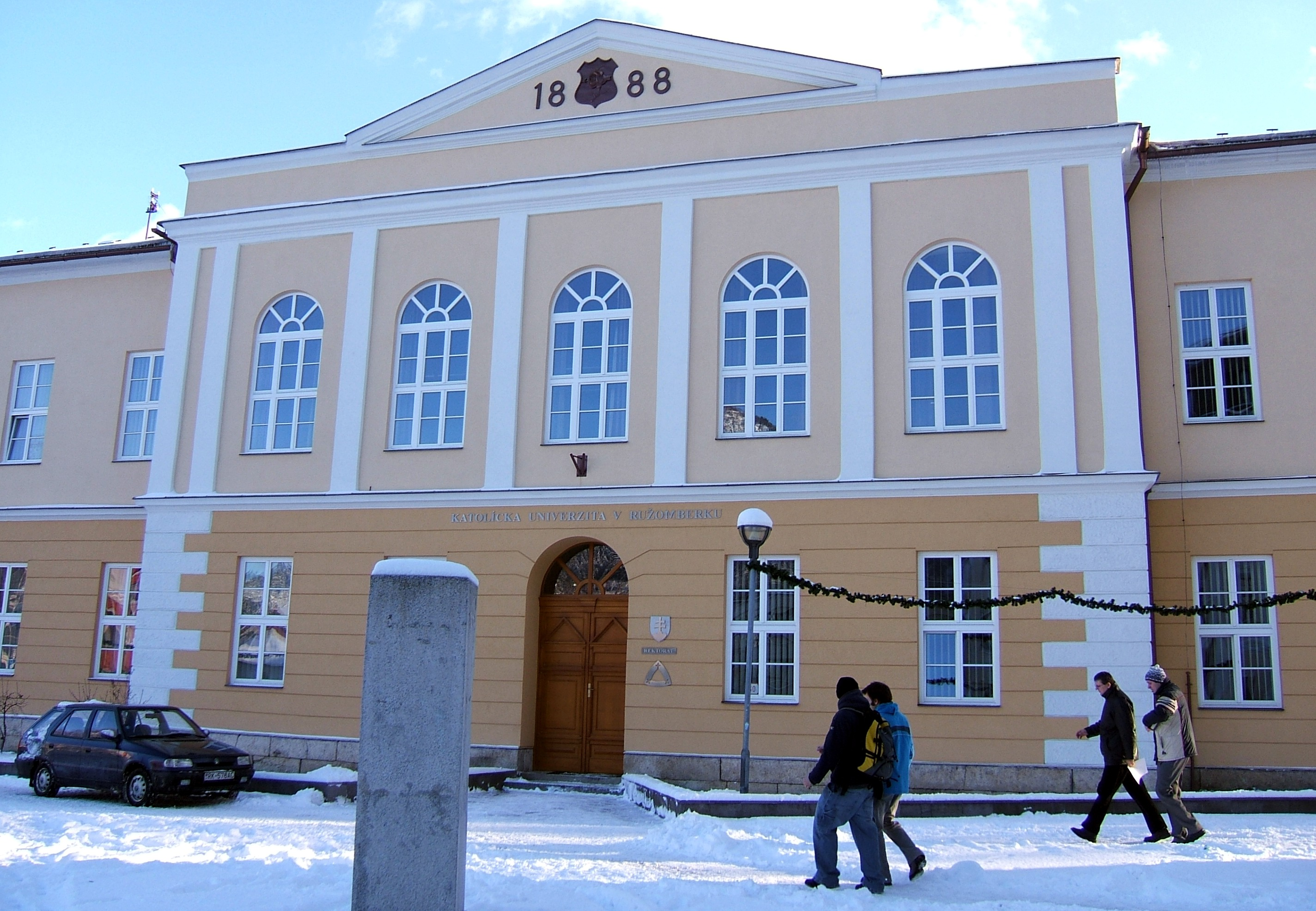
Main building of the Catholic University in Ružomberok, Slovakia

- Catholic University in Ružomberok, Ružomberok
- Roman Catholic Faculty of Theology in Bratislava, Comenius University, Bratislava
- University of Prešov Faculty of Greek-Catholic Theology, Prešov
- University of Trnava Faculty of Theology, Bratislava

=== Slovenia ===
- Catholic Institute Faculty of Law & Business Studies (FLBS), Ljubljana
- University of Ljubljana Faculty of Theology, Ljubljana

=== South Africa ===
- St Augustine College of South Africa, Johannesburg

=== South Sudan ===
- Catholic University of South Sudan, Juba and Wau
- St. Mary's University in Juba, Juba

=== Spain ===
- Abat Oliba CEU University, Barcelona
- Catholic University of Ávila, Avila
- CEU San Pablo University, Madrid
- Chemical Institute of Sarrià, Barcelona
- Comillas Pontifical University, Madrid
- ESADE, Barcelona
- Fernando III University, Seville
- Holy Family University Center, Úbeda
- IESE Business School, Barcelona
- International University of Catalonia, Barcelona
- Loyola University Andalusia, Córdoba and Seville
- Pontifical University of Salamanca, Salamanca
- Ramon Llull University, Barcelona
- Real Centro Universitario Escorial-Maria Christina, San Lorenzo de El Escorial
- Saint Louis University Madrid Campus, Madrid
- San Damaso Ecclesiastical University, Madrid
- Universidad Católica San Antonio de Murcia, Murcia
- Universidad CEU Cardenal Herrera, Valencia
- Universidad Francisco de Vitoria, Madrid
- Universidad San Jorge, Villanueva de Gállego
- University of Agricultural Engineering, Valladolid
- University of Deusto, Bilbao
- University of Navarra, Pamplona
- Valencia Catholic University Saint Vincent Martyr, Valencia
- Villanueva University, Madrid

=== Sri Lanka ===
- Aquinas College of Higher Studies (Aquinas University College), Colombo
- Benedict XVI Catholic Institute, Negombo

=== Sudan ===
- Comboni College for Science and Technology, Khartoum

=== Sweden ===
- Newman Institute, Uppsala

=== Switzerland ===
- University of Fribourg, Fribourg
- University of Lucerne Faculty of Theology, Luzern

=== Taiwan ===
- Cardinal Tien College of Healthcare and Management, New Taipei
- Fu Jen Catholic University, New Taipei
- Providence University, Taichung
- Saint Mary's Junior College of Medicine, Nursing and Management, Yilan
- Wenzao Ursuline University of Languages, Kaohsiung

=== Tanzania ===
- Catholic University of Health and Allied Sciences, Mwanza
- Mwenge Catholic University, Moshi
- Ruaha Catholic University, Iringa
- St. Augustine University of Tanzania, Nyegezi & Malimbe
- St. Francis University College of Health and Allied Sciences, Ifakara
- St. Joseph University In Tanzania, Dar es Salaam

=== Timor-Leste ===
- Instituto Católico para Formação de Professores, Baucau
- Instituto Filosófico de São Francisco de Sales, Dili
- Instituto Profissional de Canossa, Dili
- Instituto Superior de Filosofia e de Teologia, Dili
- St. John de Britto Institute, Kasait
- Universidade Católica Timorense, Dili

=== Thailand ===
- Assumption University, Bangkok
- Saint John's Group of Schools and University, Bangkok
- Saint Louis College, Bangkok
- St. Theresa International College, Nakhon Nayok

=== Togo ===
- Université Catholique de l'Afrique de l'Ouest - Unité universitaire à Togo, Lomé

=== Uganda ===
- Uganda Martyrs University, Nkozi
- University of Kisubi, Kisubi
- University of the Sacred Heart Gulu, Gulu

=== Ukraine ===
- Superior Institute of Religious Sciences of St. Thomas Aquinas, Kyiv
- Ukrainian Catholic University, Lviv

=== United Arab Emirates ===
- Saint Joseph University - Dubai, Dubai

=== United Kingdom ===
There are four universities, six other institutes of higher studies, and one ecclesiastical faculty (within a Catholic university) recognised by the Catholic Education Service of the Catholic Bishops Conference of England and Wales. In addition, there is a residential college associated with a religious order in England, and a university college in Northern Ireland.

Universities

- Leeds Trinity University
- Liverpool Hope University (also a Church of England university)
- Newman University, Birmingham
- St Mary's University, Twickenham, London
  - Mater Ecclesia College (ecclesiastical faculty)

University college

- St Mary's University College, Belfast; college of Queen's University Belfast

Institutes of higher studies

- Blackfriars Hall; permanent private hall of the University of Oxford (Order of Preachers)
- Campion Hall, Oxford; permanent private hall of the University of Oxford (Society of Jesus)
- Centre for Catholic Studies, Durham University.
- Margaret Beaufort Institute of Theology, Cambridge
- Maryvale Institute, Birmingham
- Von Hugel Institute, St Edmund's College, Cambridge

Residential college

- Digby Stuart College, University of Roehampton (Society of the Sacred Heart)

=== United States ===
There are 244 Catholic higher education degree-granting institutions in the United States.

=== Uruguay ===
- Universidad Católica del Uruguay Dámaso Antonio Larrañaga, Montevideo
- Universidad de Montevideo, Montevideo

=== Vatican ===
- Alphonsian Academy; Redemptorists
- Institute of the Theology of the Consecrated Life Claretianum; Claretians
- John Paul II Pontifical Theological Institute for Marriage and Family Sciences
- Marianum; Servite Order
- Patristic Institute Augustinianum; Augustinians
- Pontifical Athenaeum Regina Apostolorum; Legionaries of Christ
- Pontifical Biblical Institute; Jesuits
- Pontifical Institute of Arab and Islamic Studies; White Fathers
- Pontifical Institute of Sacred Music
- Pontifical Oriental Institute; Jesuits
- Pontifical Theological Faculty Teresianum; Carmelites
- Pontificia Università Gregoriana; Jesuits
- Pontificia Università Lateranense; Diocese of Rome
- Pontifical University Antonianum; Franciscans
- Pontifical University of the Holy Cross; Opus Dei
- Pontifical University of St. Bonaventure; Conventual Franciscans
- Pontifical University of St. Thomas Aquinas (Angelicum); Dominicans
- Pontifical Urbaniana University; Congregation for the Evangelization of Peoples
- Pontificio Ateneo Sant Anselmo; Benedictines
- Salesian Pontifical University; Salesians

=== Venezuela ===
- Andrés Bello Catholic University, Caracas
- Catholic University of Tachira, San Cristóbal
- Jesus the Worker University Institute, Caracas
- Universidad Católica Cecilio Acosta, Maracaibo
- Universidad Católica Santa Rosa, Caracas
- Universidad Monteávila, Caracas

=== Vietnam ===
- Catholic Institute of Vietnam, Ho Chi Minh City; f.2016
- Loyola University Chicago Vietnam Center, Ho Chi Minh City
- Pontifical College of St. Pius X, Da Lat

=== Zambia ===
- Charles Lwanga College of Education, Chisekesi
- DMI St. Eugene University, Chibombo and Chipata
- St. Bonaventure University College, Lusaka
- Zambia Catholic University, Kalulushi

=== Zimbabwe ===
- Arrupe Jesuit University, Harare
- Catholic University of Zimbabwe, Harare

== Academic rankings ==
Some of the universities, including Katholieke Universiteit Leuven, are ranked in the top list of universities according to the Times Higher Education journal. There is so far no list of academic rankings of Catholic universities. In the United States, U.S. News & World Report magazine provides the Best Colleges ranking; University of Notre Dame, Georgetown University, and Boston College have been scored as top Catholic national universities.

== See also ==
- Anahuac University Network
- Association of Catholic Colleges and Universities
- Association of Jesuit Colleges and Universities
- Catholic school
- Ecclesiastical university
- Ex Corde Ecclesiae
- International Council of Universities of Saint Thomas Aquinas
- International Federation of Catholic Universities
- Lasallian educational institutions
- List of Eastern Catholic seminaries
- List of Jesuit institutions
- List of Catholic seminaries
- Newman Centers
- Opus Dei in society
- Pontifical universities in Rome
- Pontifical university
- Universidad Católica
