= SACRU =

The Strategic Alliance of Catholic Research Universities (SACRU) is an international network of research-intensive Catholic universities committed to academic excellence, global collaboration, and engagement inspired by Catholic social teaching. The network aims to foster interdisciplinary research, support international mobility, and promote dialogue between science, education, and society.

== History ==
SACRU was established to strengthen cooperation among leading Catholic universities with a strong research profile. The alliance emerged from ongoing discussions between rectors and academic leaders who sought to create a global platform for sharing research, enhancing internationalization, and promoting Catholic intellectual traditions within contemporary academic discourse.

The Strategic Alliance of Catholic Research Universities (SACRU) was officially established on October 12, 2018. The founding ceremony, during which the “Declaration of the Global Strategic Alliance” was signed, took place at the Catholic University of Portugal (Universidade Católica Portuguesa).

Since its formation SACRU has focused on building research partnerships, organizing joint academic initiatives, and supporting collaboration across continents.

== Mission and Objectives ==
SACRU's mission is grounded in the principles of Catholic social teaching, emphasizing human dignity, solidarity, sustainability, and the common good. The alliance seeks to:

- Promote collaborative research on global challenges
- Support academic exchange and mobility programs
- Encourage interdisciplinary and intercultural dialogue
- Contribute to societal development through knowledge transfer
- Strengthen the visibility of Catholic research universities in the global academic landscape

== Activities ==
SACRU facilitates various academic and institutional initiatives, including:

- Joint research projects on topics such as ethics, sustainability, health, social cohesion, and technology
- International conferences and workshops that bring together scholars from member institutions
- Student and faculty mobility programs aimed at fostering global academic experience
- Collaborative teaching formats such as online courses, seminars, and summer schools
- Publications and policy papers addressing issues of global relevance from a Catholic academic perspective

== Member Institutions ==
The alliance consists of Catholic universities that combine a strong research identity with a commitment to the Catholic intellectual tradition. Membership spans multiple continents, reflecting SACRU’s global orientation. Member universities typically include institutions with long-standing academic reputations and significant research activity-

Actual SACRU member universities:

- Australian Catholic University (Australia)
- Boston College (USA)
- Pontificia Universidad Católica de Chile (Chile)
- Pontifícia Universidade Católica do Rio de Janeiro (Brazil)
- Sophia University (Japan)
- Universidade Catòlica Portuguesa (Portugal)
- Università Cattolica del Sacro Cuore (Italy)
- Universitat Ramon Llull (Spain)
- Pontificia Universidad Javeriana (Colombia)

The SACRU Secretariat is based at the Università Cattolica del Sacro Cuore in Milan, Italy.

== See also ==
- Catholic higher education
- Catholic social teaching
