= Universidad Católica =

Universidad Católica, Spanish for "Catholic university", may refer to:

== Argentina ==
- Universidad Católica Argentina, in Buenos Aires
- Universidad Católica de Córdoba, in Córdoba
- Catholic University of Santa Fe

== Bolivia ==
- Universidad Católica Boliviana, La Paz

== Chile ==
- Universidad Católica de Chile, in Santiago
- Universidad Católica de Valparaíso, in Valparaíso
- Universidad Católica del Maule, in Talca
- Universidad Católica del Norte, in Antofagasta
- Universidad Católica de Temuco, in Temuco
- Universidad Católica de la Santísima Concepción

== Colombia ==
- Catholic University of Colombia, Bogota
- Universidad Católica de Oriente, Rionegro

== Costa Rica ==
- Universidad Católica de Costa Rica, in San José

== Cuba ==
- Universidad Católica de Santo Tomás de Villanueva, in Havana

== Dominican Republic ==
- Pontificia Universidad Católica Madre y Maestra, in Santiago de los Caballeros
- Universidad Católica Santo Domingo, in Santo Domingo

== Ecuador ==
- Pontificia Universidad Católica del Ecuador, in Quito
- Universidad Católica de Santiago de Guayaquil, Guayaquil

== Honduras ==
- Universidad Católica de Honduras, in Tegucigalpa

== Nicaragua ==
- Catholic University Redemptoris Mater, Managua

== Panama ==
- Universidad Católica Santa María La Antigua, Panama City

== Paraguay ==
- Universidad Católica Nuestra Señora de la Asunción, in Asunción

== Peru ==
- Pontificia Universidad Católica del Perú, in Lima
- Universidad Católica Sedes Sapientiae, in Lima
- Universidad Católica de Santa María, in Arequipa
- Universidad Católica de San Pablo, in Arequipa

== Spain ==
- Universidad Católica San Antonio de Murcia, in Murcia

== Uruguay ==
- Universidad Católica del Uruguay Dámaso Antonio Larrañaga, in Montevideo

== Venezuela ==
- Universidad Católica Andrés Bello, with its main campus in Caracas

== See also ==
- Catholic university
