= Club Deportivo Universidad Católica (disambiguation) =

Club Deportivo Universidad Católica is a football club based in Santiago, Chile.

Club Deportivo Universidad Católica may also refer to:

- Club Deportivo Universidad Católica (multi-sports club), parent organization of the Chilean football club
- Club Deportivo Universidad Católica del Ecuador, a football club based in Quito, Ecuador

== See also ==
- Universidad Católica (disambiguation)
