= Pontifical Catholic University of Paraná =

Catholic university in Brazil

- Pontifícia Universidade Católica do Paraná
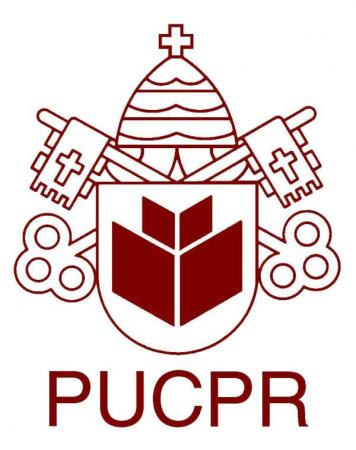
- Other names: PUCPR, PUC-PR
- Motto: Scientia, vita et fides
- Type: Private, not-for-profit, Catholic university
- Established: March 14, 1959; 67 years ago
- Religious affiliation: Catholic Church
- Chancellor: José Antônio Peruzzo
- Vice-Chancellor: Vidal Martins
- Rector: Vacant
- Location: Curitiba, Paraná, Brazil
- Campus: Curitiba; Londrina; Maringá; Toledo
- Colors: Red and white
- Website: www.pucpr.br

The Pontifical Catholic University of Paraná (Portuguese: Pontifícia Universidade Católica do Paraná, PUCPR) is a private, not-for-profit Catholic university headquartered in Curitiba, Paraná, Brazil. It is maintained by the Associação Paranaense de Cultura, an educational association linked to the Marist Brothers.

PUCPR has campuses in Curitiba, Londrina, Maringá and Toledo. The Archbishop of Curitiba serves as the university's Grand Chancellor.

== History ==
PUCPR traces its foundation to 14 March 1959, when the Universidade Católica do Paraná was founded in Curitiba. The foundation brought together several existing educational and cultural institutions, including the Círculo de Estudos Bandeirantes, the Faculdade Católica de Direito do Paraná, the Faculdade de Ciências Médicas do Paraná, the Faculdade de Filosofia, Ciências e Letras de Curitiba, the Escola de Serviço Social do Paraná, the Escola de Enfermagem Madre Léonie, and the Faculdade de Ciências Econômicas.

In 1973, the university became associated with the Marist Brothers, who assumed its administration through the Associação Paranaense de Cultura.

The title of Pontifical University was granted in 1985. PUCPR states that the concession made it the sixth Catholic higher education institution in Brazil to receive the pontifical title.

== Organisation ==
PUCPR is maintained by the Associação Paranaense de Cultura. Institutional documents describe the association as a private, philanthropic educational entity and describe PUCPR as a private, not-for-profit, confessional and community institution.

The Grand Chancellor of PUCPR is the Metropolitan Archbishop of Curitiba. In case of a vacant see, the role is exercised by the prelate administering the Archdiocese of Curitiba. José Antônio Peruzzo, Archbishop of Curitiba, has been identified by the university as Grand Chancellor of PUCPR.

Rogério Renato Mateucci served as rector of PUCPR from 2022 until his death in 2026.

== Academic structure ==
PUCPR is organised into academic schools. Its international office lists six schools: the Business School, Law School, Polytechnic School, School of Fine Arts, School of Education and Humanities, and School of Medicine and Life Sciences.

The university offers undergraduate, lato sensu postgraduate, stricto sensu postgraduate, technical, continuing education, and distance-learning programmes. According to PUCPR International, the university offers undergraduate and graduate programmes across its academic schools and campuses.

== Campuses ==
The main campus is located in Curitiba, in the Prado Velho district. PUCPR also has campuses in Londrina, Maringá and Toledo, all in the state of Paraná.

The Curitiba campus includes academic buildings, laboratories, libraries, cultural spaces, sports facilities and health-related teaching facilities. The campus also houses the University Museum, the Jesus Mestre University Chapel, the TUCA theatre, and the university's central library system.

PUCPR also maintains an international hub in Florence, Italy, associated with Kent State University.

== Research and innovation ==
PUCPR conducts research through its academic schools, graduate programmes, laboratories and applied research units. The university has a Research Ethics Committee responsible for reviewing research involving human participants.

The university's innovation ecosystem is known as Hotmilk. Hotmilk is described by PUCPR as its innovation ecosystem and operates in areas such as open innovation, corporate education, startup connections and innovation consulting.

PUCPR's Fazenda Experimental Gralha Azul, located in Fazenda Rio Grande, is used for teaching and research activities connected to areas such as veterinary medicine, agronomy and animal science.

== Health and affiliated facilities ==
The Hospital Universitário Cajuru is linked to PUCPR's health-related academic activities and to the university's schools of Medicine and Life Sciences. The hospital is part of the Marist health network and provides care through Brazil's public health system, the Sistema Único de Saúde.

The Hospital Marcelino Champagnat is also part of the Marist health structure and has been associated with teaching and research initiatives involving PUCPR and the Hospital Universitário Cajuru.

== Community engagement ==
PUCPR maintains a community project programme, known as Projeto Comunitário. The programme was implemented in 2002 and approved by the university council as a mandatory curricular extension component.

== International partnerships ==
PUCPR maintains international academic partnerships and exchange programmes. Its American Academy programme is a dual-enrolment undergraduate programme offered jointly with Kent State University. Kent State describes the programme as allowing students to complete the first two years of undergraduate study in Brazil, taking Kent State classes in English at PUCPR and earning academic credit from both institutions.

Kent State University states that its partnership with PUCPR dates from 2012 and that the two universities formally recognised an elevated strategic relationship in 2016.

== Recognition and rankings ==
PUCPR is listed as active in the Brazilian Ministry of Education's e-MEC registry, the official national database for higher education institutions and courses in Brazil.

In the Times Higher Education World University Rankings 2026, PUCPR was placed in the 1201–1500 band globally. In the same profile, the university was listed in subject rankings for Business and Economics, Medical and Health, Computer Science, Engineering, Law, Life Sciences and Social Sciences.

In the Times Higher Education Impact Rankings 2025, PUCPR was placed in the 801–1000 band overall.

In the QS World University Rankings 2025, PUCPR was listed in the 1401+ band globally. QS also listed the university as 85th in the Latin America and Caribbean ranking.
