= Thomas More Universitas =

Coordinates: 12.10154°N 86.26508°W

- Universidad Thomas More (UTM)
- Motto: Profesionales de Primera
- Type: Private
- Established: 2000
- Rector: Irene Rojas
- Location: Managua, Nicaragua
- Nickname: UTM
- Website: www.unithomasmore.edu.ni

Thomas More Universitas (Spanish: Universidad Thomas More (UTM)) is a private, Catholic university located in Managua, Nicaragua. It was founded in 1997 and is one of the 46 universities accredited by the National University Council (Consejo Nacional de Universidades, CNU). The founder of the university, Silvio De Franco, was a former Secretary of Education under President Violeta Chamorro's democratic government.
