= Mokpo Catholic University =

Catholic university in Mokpo, South Korea

Coordinates: 34.8268°N 126.4192°E

- Hangul: 목포가톨릭대학교
- Hanja: 木浦가톨릭大學校
- RR: Mokpo Gatollik daehakgyo
- MR: Mokp'o Kat'ollik taehakkyo

Mokpo Catholic University (Korean: 목포가톨릭대학교) is a Catholic university located in Mokpo, South Korea.
