= Catholic University of Ávila =

Spanish university

Coordinates: 40.6641°N 4.6985°W

Catholic University of Avila
- Universidad Católica Santa Teresa de Jesús de Ávila
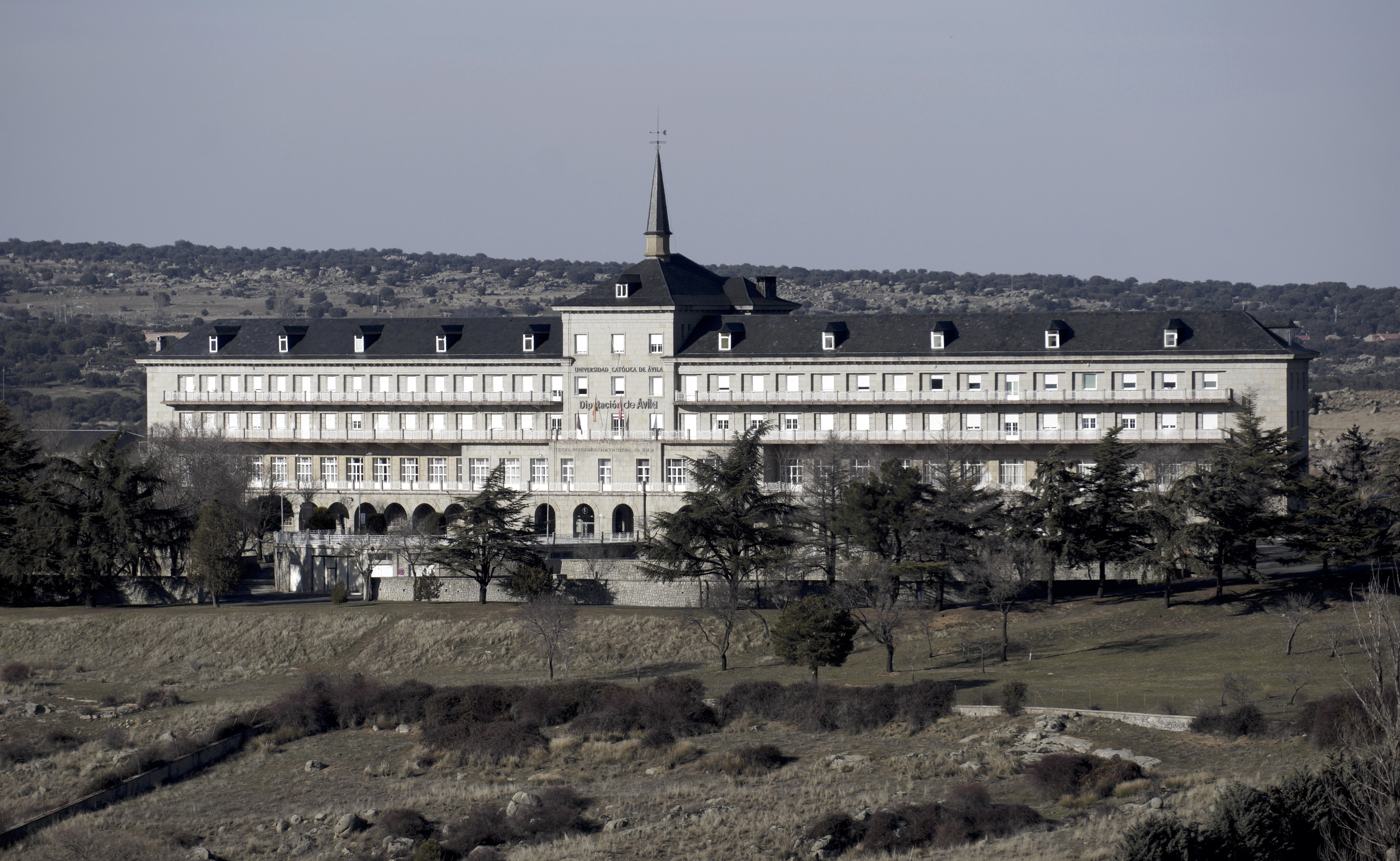
- Main building of the Catholic University of Ávila.
- Type: Private
- Established: August 24, 1996
- Affiliation: Catholic
- Rector: Maria Rosario Sáez Yuguero
- Location: Ávila, Castile and León, Spain
- Website: http://www.ucavila.es

Saint Teresa of Jesus Catholic University (Spanish: Universidad Católica Santa Teresa de Jesús de Ávila), commonly known as the Catholic University of Ávila (UCAV), is a private, Catholic university, located in Ávila, Castile and León, Spain. It is named after Saint Teresa of Ávila.

The current rector of the university is Maria Rosario Sáez Yuguero.

== History ==
On August 24, 1996, Antonio Cañizares Llovera, bishop of the diocese of Ávila, founded the university via a decree. The university is named for the city and Teresa of Ávila.

In 2021, Forbes listed the Catholic University of Ávila among the 20 best universities of Spain.

== Degrees ==
The Catholic University of Ávila offers degrees in business, law, and engineering.

== Institute of Hispanic Studies ==
The Institute of Hispanic Studies at the university offers a summer program for students from other countries to study Spanish language, culture, and civilization. The Institute offers a Catholic mysticism course, and through weekend trips, allows students to visit the cities of Segovia, Salamanca, Madrid, as well as important Carmelite sites like Fontiveros and Alba de Tormes.
