= Universidad del Salvador =

Private university in Argentina

Coordinates: 34°35′58.7″S 58°23′34.48″W

University of El Salvador
- Universidad del Salvador
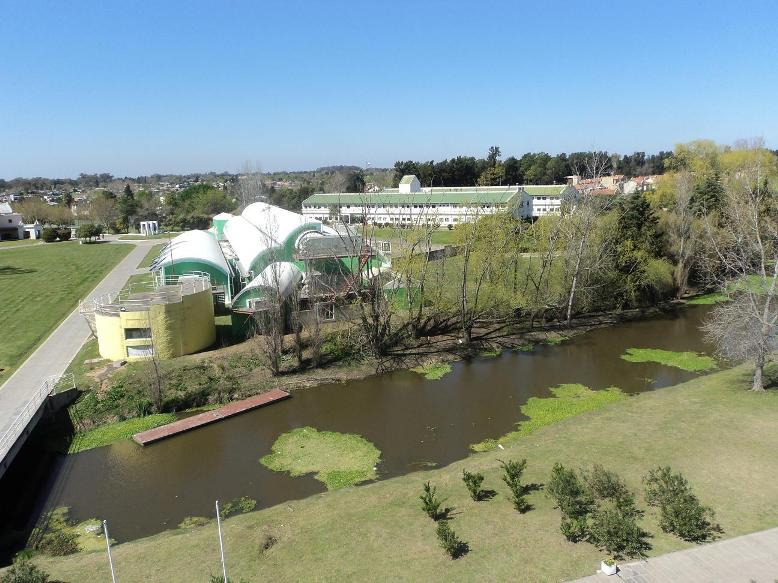
- Aerial view of "Nuestra Sra del Pilar" campus
- Motto: Scientiam do menti, Cordi Virtutem; Science to the mind, Virtue to the Heart
- Type: Private
- Established: 1958; 68 years ago
- Religious affiliation: Roman Catholic, (Jesuit)
- Rector: Juan Alejandro Tobias
- Students: ca. 28.000 students
- Location: Buenos Aires, Argentina
- Campus: Nuestra Señora del Pilar
- Website: usal.edu.ar

The University of the Salvador (Spanish: Universidad del Salvador, also known for its acronym USAL) is a Jesuit university in Buenos Aires, Argentina. In addition to its campus in downtown Buenos Aires, it has instructional and research facilities in Pilar, San Miguel, Bahía Blanca, and in the provinces of Santa Cruz and Misiones. As of 2012, approximately 20,000 undergraduate and over 8,000 graduate students were enrolled.

== History ==
The Society of Jesus (Jesuits), which had founded the first Argentine university in the city of Córdoba in 1622, created the Superior Institute of Philosophy in the seat of the Colegio del Salvador (primary and secondary levels). This Institute was the nearest predecessor for the Universidad del Salvador.

Private universities were authorized in 1955, and on May 2 of the following year the Foundation Act of the "University Faculties of Salvador" was signed. On May 15, 1958, the name was changed to the University Institutes of Salvador, and finally to Universidad del Salvador on December 8, 1959.

In March 1975, the Jesuits entrusted management of the university to a group of lay people, who took on the responsibility of keeping the identity of the Universidad del Salvador by meeting Jesuit goals and aims. Institutional direction is still governed by the Jesuits, who appoint authorities through the Civil Association Universidad del Salvador.

== Faculties and schools ==
- Faculty of Administration
- Faculty of Economic Sciencies
- Faculty of Education & Social Communications
- Faculty of Law
- Faculty of Social Sciences
- Faculty of History, Geography & Tourism
- Faculty of Medicine
- Faculty of Psychology & Psychopedagogy
- Faculty of Science & Technology
- School of Agronomy
- School of Veterinary Medicine
- School of Design
- School of Art and Architecture
- School of Oriental Studies
- School of Modern Languages

== See also ==
- List of Jesuit sites
