= Catholic University of Applied Sciences Freiburg =

Coordinates: 48.0039°N 7.8575°E

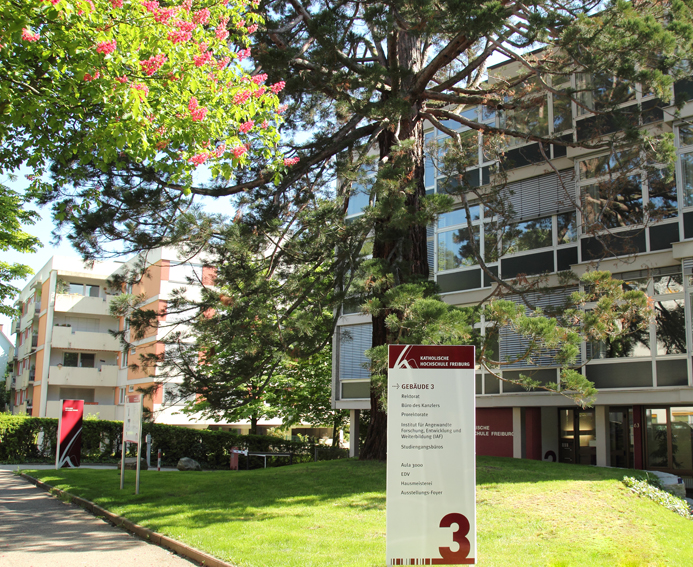
Catholic University of Applied Sciences Freiburg Building 3

The Catholic University of Applied Sciences Freiburg (German Katholische Hochschule Freiburg) was founded in 1971 through combining several predecessor institutions. It is one of the five Universities of Freiburg and one of the seven Catholic Universities of Applied Sciences in Germany.

== The University ==
The Catholic University of Applied Sciences in Freiburg im Breisgau is the biggest University of Applied Sciences of Social- and Healthcare in the state of Baden-Württemberg. The responsible body of the Catholic University of Applied Sciences is the Catholic University of Applied Sciences Freiburg gGmbH (Katholische Hochschule Freiburg gGmbH). The shareholders are the archdiocese Freiburg, the diocese Rottenburg-Stuttgart, the German Caritas association, the Caritas association of the archdiocese Freiburg and the Caritas association of the diocese Rottenburg-Stuttgart.

The Catholic University of Applied Sciences is state-approved. The Catholic University of Applied Sciences Freiburg offers seven Bachelor programmes and four Master programmes as well as eight additional voluntary courses of study. 1700 enrolled students are supported by 34 professors in teaching, research and executive education. The Caritas-Library (which also functions as the University library ) is the largest specialised library for social sciences and healthcare. The Catholic University of Applied Sciences is part of a network with 15 European Universities as well as partnerships with universities in North and South America.

== History ==
The first Social Studies schools were founded in Freiburg after the end of World War I. The qualification of its staff has always been of central importance to the founder of the German Caritas association (Deutscher Caritasverband), Lorenz Werthmann. In 1920, the Caritas School Freiburg (Caritasschule Freiburg) was founded based on the focus of preparing church communities for charitable work. In 1933, the school was renamed to "Seminar for social welfare worker" (Seminar für Wohlfahrtspfleger) On 1 October 2010, the Catholic Technical College Freiburg (Katholische Fachhochschule Freiburg) was renamed to the Catholic University of Applied Sciences Freiburg (Katholische Hochschule Freiburg).

== University principles ==
- Christian view of humanity
- Interdisciplinarity
- Musical education
- Intercultural learning

== Tuition Fees ==
In 2007, tuition fees of €500 were introduced by the federal government of Baden-Württemberg. In 2011, these fees have been abolished again for state universities. For the winter semester 2012/13, the tuition fees for the Bachelor programmes at the Catholic University of Applied Sciences Freiburg were reduced from €500 to €280.

== Range of Studies ==
Available Bachelor programmes:

- Social Work
- Health Care
- Curative Education/Inclusive Education
- Management for Health Care
- Vocational Education for Health Care (former Nursing Education)
- Management for Pedagogical and Educational Institutes (consecutive studies)
- Pedagogics/Educational Studies

Master programmes: consecutive

- Clinical Curative Education
- Development of Social and Health Services

Further Education

- Applied Ethics for social and health care
- Management und leadership skills are offered as an open study programme within the framework of the programme Project and studies
