= Higher Institute of Technology of Central Africa =

Higher education institution in Yaoundé, Cameroon

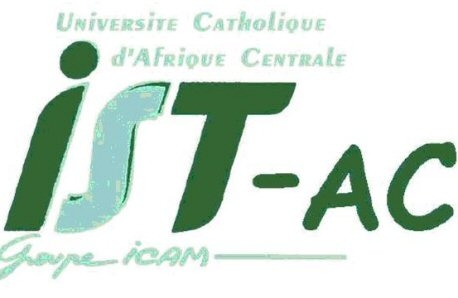
Higher Institute of Technology of Central Africa group logo

IST-AC (Institut Supérieur de Technologie d’Afrique Centrale) is a higher education institution, part of the Catholic University of Central Africa (UCAC). Its headquarters are in Yaoundé, Cameroon. Management of IST-AC is entrusted to a French engineering Institute (Institut catholique d'arts et métiers).

The main objective of IST-AC is to educate engineers. IST-AC offers hands-on training, with both theoretical knowledge and practical experience, getting students ready for employment. The school is open addressed to all countries in Central Africa, including Angola, Cameroon, Congo, Gabon, CAR, DRC, Chad.

Open since 2002, the campus in Pointe Noire, Republic of Congo, emphasizes the first two-year of engineering training, with a program focused on Industrial Maintenance. The campus also offers a sandwich course (cooperative technician training) directed towards the job market, and training for working professionals.

Open since 2004, the campus in Douala, Republic of Cameroon, welcomes students from Pointe-Noire, selected for the second cycle of engineering training. This program is a cooperative program, which means that students spend half of their time in school and the other half working in industry. This three-year training is also open to external two-year Degree students in industrial (mechanical or manufacturing) engineering and to working professionals, selected by their company. The Campus also offers specific professional training and studies focused on improving industrial process and tools.

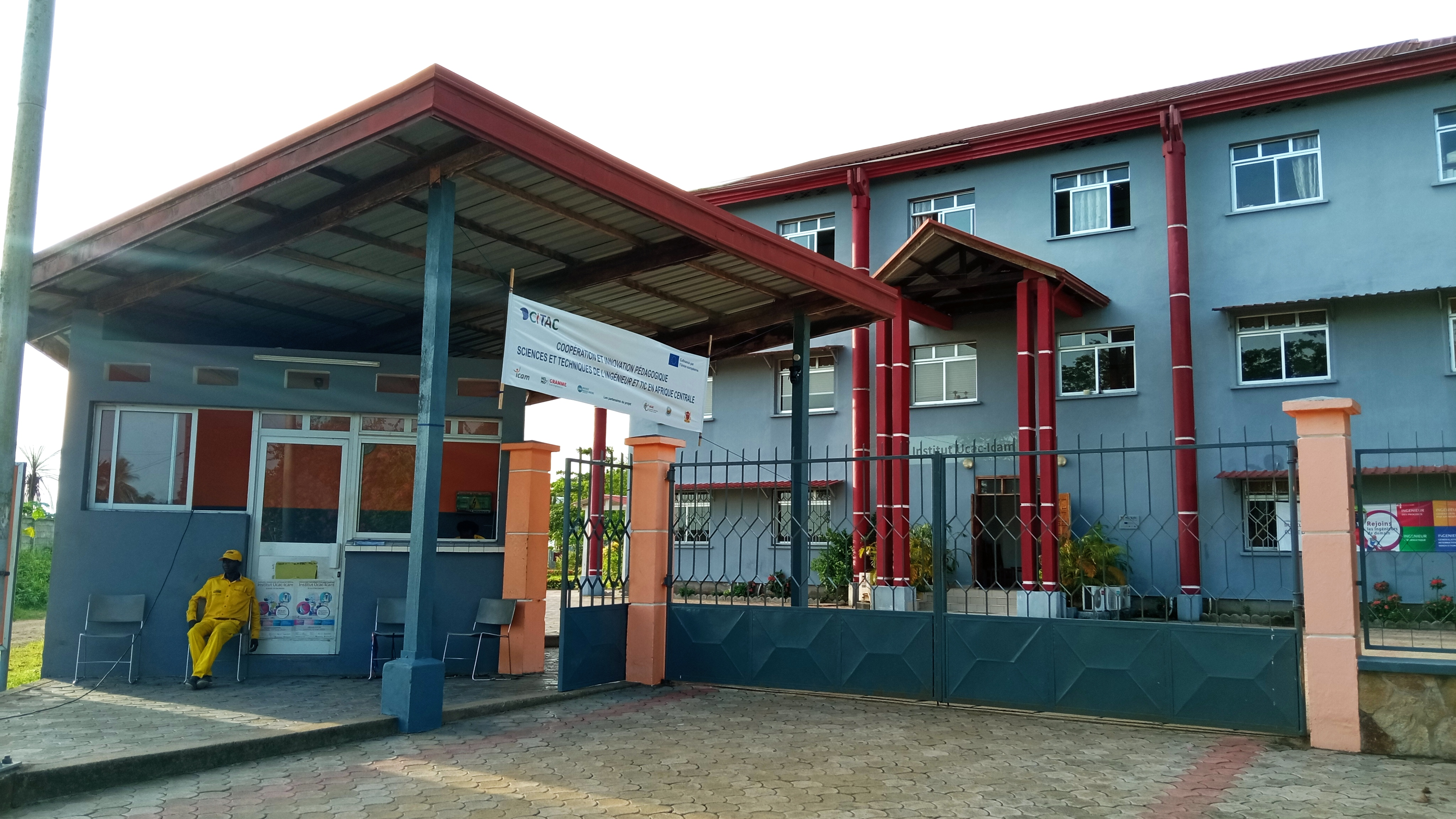
Higher Institute of Technology of Central Africa campus

Across the university, 60% of students study engineering, 20% industrial management and 20% in communication and management.

As of 2011, about one hundred engineers had graduated (promotions 2007, 2008, 2009, 2010, 2011); 150 training contracts, with nearly one hundred companies were in effect; and IST-AC hosted a total 240 students (20% female), across five nationalities. Fifteen professional training sessions had been completed. The school graduates approximately sixty students each year.
