= Jesus the Worker University Institute =

Coordinates: 11°57′10.17″S 77°3′6.96″W

- Abbreviation: IUJO
- Established: 1997; 29 years ago
- Type: State subsidized
- Location(s): Los Flores de Catia, Sucre; Caracas, Venezuela
- Director: María del Pilar Loyo
- Students: 1700
- Affiliations: Jesuit, Catholic, Fe y Alegría

Jesus the Worker University Institute (IUJO), (Instituto Universitario Jesús Obrero) was opened by the Jesuits in Caracas, Venezuela, in 1997 to educate the poorer sector of society.

== Courses ==
Current course offerings:

- Educational Sciences
- Preschool Education (Technical)
- Integral Education (Technical)
- Social Sciences
- Accounting (Technical)
- Engineering, Architecture and Technology
- Informatics (Technical)
- Electronics
- Electrical Engineering

== See also ==
- List of Jesuit sites
