= Higher Vocational Agricultural School of Bevalala =

Agricultural School

Coordinates: 18°58′5.98″S 47°31′17.89″E

Location
- Bevalala, Antananarivo; Madagascar

Information
- Type: Jesuit, Catholic
- Denomination: All faiths
- Grades: BAC+3
- Gender: Coeducational
- Enrollment: 50/year
- Campus: Rural
- Tuition: 1993; 33 years ago
- Earlier name: Rural Learning Centre
- Sister institution: School of Building and Public Works
- Website: EPSA in English

Higher Vocational Agricultural School of Bevalala – Ecole Professionnelle Supérieure Agricole de Bevalala (EPSA) – in Bevalala, Madagascar, was in 1957 a Jesuit outreach to assist farmers and craftsmen with marginal income to increase their income. It has grown to offer a 3-year bachelor's degree.

== History ==
Rural Learning Center (RAC) began as an outreach to help poor farmers to increase their yield, as a program of 20–30 days at an internship farm, and for craftsmen to improve their production technology. After Fr. Alain Delaitre took charge in 1957 the effort evolved to include livestock farming, "FIFA". With an increasing number of clientele seeking training, and the demand for more breadth in the educational effort, the center now offers 10 different courses. In 1985 a masonry school was added (Building Technical School, ETB), and the name of the institute was changed to PSC Bevalala. In 1995 ETB was officially recognized by the government ministry. Jesuit higher education in agronomy, begun in 1993 as a 2-year, National Higher Diploma farm (BAC +2), received approval from the government ministry in 1998.

From 2003, when the Jesuit Assistentcy of Africa and Madagascar determined to found a technical university incorporating PSC and the EPSA, the effort was extended with the encouragement of the government to areas not yet covered, like milk, meat, SRI, and organic farming. In 2006 with the government's adoption of the LMD system in higher education, the EPSA BAC+2 formula became BAC+3.

Since 2003, the Building Technical School has also been accredited in courses like masonry, reinforced concrete, sanitation engineering, woodwork, and metal work. During the 2011–2012 school year ETB became a college, the School of Building and Public Works (ESBTP) of Bevalala, approved by the Ministry of Technical Education and Vocational Training. It now offers a Senior Technicians Diploma (SDRs) for BACC+2, and Professional Degree in Building and Construction (LPBTP) for BACC+3.

== See also ==
- List of Jesuit sites
