= Claretianum =

Educational institute of the Roman Catholic Church

Coordinates: 41.8935°N 12.4193°E

The Claretianum, officially the Claretian Pontifical Institute of the Theology of the Consecrated Life (Italian: L’Istituto Pontificio di Teologia della Vita Consacrata Claretianum; Latin: Pontificium Institutum Theologiae Vitae Consecratae Claretianum), is a pontifical educational institute of the Roman Catholic Church in Rome founded by the Claretians. It is part of the Pontifical Lateran University as an institute specialising in the theology of the consecrated life.

The institute began to function in 1959 as the Claritianum of Rome and was affiliated with the Lateran University in 1963. It was formally established on 6 June 1971 by the Congregation for Catholic Education. In 2023, Pope Francis granted the institute the title of "Pontifical."

The institute offers courses for the study of scripture, theology, spirituality, ecclesial charisms, history, law and psychology.

Claretianum is the Latinization of the surname Claret of the former Jesuit Antonio Maria Claret. He founded the congregation of Missionary Sons of the Immaculate Heart of Mary, commonly called the Claretians.
