= SAMIS-ESIC School of Information and Communication =

Coordinates: 18°54′55.84″S 47°31′31.93″E

- Type: Private, professional school Jesuit. Catholic
- Established: 2001; 25 years ago
- Director: Jacques Randrianary
- Location: St. Michael - BP 3832; Amparibe, Antananarivo; Madagascar
- Campus: St. Michael College
- Website: samis-esic.mg English

SAMIS-ESIC School of Information and Communication (Sekoly Ambony momba ny Ita sy ny Serasera – École Supérieure de l'Information et de la Communication) was founded in 2001 by the Jesuits on the campus of College of Saint Michael, Amparibem, Madagascar, devoted entirely to training professional journalists and communicators for the career field. Sami-ESIC offers both bachelor's and master's degrees. A typical graduation includes about 100 students.

== Mission ==
SAMIS-ESIC prepares professionals with communications skills, including written press, radio, television, and political communication, as well as expertise in information and communication technologies. This area of education was chosen by the Jesuits because of its potential for fostering the democratic process and because of the increasing importance of the web: blogs, chat, multimedia art, social networks, immersive technologies, virtual organizations, portable media, podcasts. Integrated into studies are practicums and internships.

== Program ==
Students spend the first two years on a core curriculum, and in the third year choose one of the following areas:

- Media communication (journalism)
- Organizational communication (public relations)
- Social communication

== Facilities ==
- Computer room
- Radio studio
- TV studio

== See also ==
- List of Jesuit sites
