= Universidad del Istmo =

Coordinates: 14.517642°N 90.453432°W

- Motto: "Saber para servir" (Know to serve)
- Type: Private
- Established: 1997
- Affiliations: NIBS
- Religious affiliation: Catholic
- Location: Fraijanes, Guatemala
- Website: http://unis.edu.gt/

Universidad del Istmo (University of the Isthmus), commonly referred to as UNIS, is a private university in Guatemala.

UNIS was officially founded in 1997 as the successor institution of the Instituto Femenino de Estudios Superiores (IFES), (Institute of Higher Education for Women). The assets and employees of IFES were transferred to the Universidad del Istmo in September 1997, when the university officially received its charter from Guatemala's Consejo de la Enseñanza Privada Superior (Council of Private Higher Education). There are universities in Panama City, Panama and Oaxaca, Mexico by the same name.

== History ==
The Universidad del Istmo traces its roots to 1964 when its precursor institution, the Instituto Femenino de Estudios Superiores, opened its doors to women seeking to pursue academic study, diplomas and degrees. The initial programs offered were:

- Bachelor of Arts in Interior Design
- Degree in Hospitality
- Certificate in Culinary Arts (the only program in which men were admitted)
- Diploma in Home Management
- Diploma in Theological Culture and Pedagogy of Faith; among others.

On 29 September 1997, in response to an official request from IFES and other supporters, Guatemala's Council of Private Higher Education authorized the creation and operation of the Universidad del Istmo. Formal approval was published in the Official Gazette on 16 October 1997. Following the establishment of the university, degrees offered by IFES were officially granted by the Universidad del Istmo, ending a previous arrangement with the Universidad de San Carlos de Guatemala. IFES subsequently became a unit in the university, and its courses incorporated into programs offered by UNIS's other schools and faculties.

The Universidad del Istmo officially opened its doors on 2 February 1998, when it welcomed 215 students. The founding faculties were:

- The School of Business and Economics, which offered a bachelor's degree in Business Management with three minors: International Business, Hospitality and Tourism, and Hospitals and Service Companies.
- The School of Architecture and Design, which offered a degree in Architecture, Interior Architecture, Graphic Design in Communication, and Industrial Fashion Design.

Over the next several years, UNIS expanded its academic offering, opening a Faculty of Law in 2001, School of Communication in 2004, and School of Education and Engineering in 2005.

== Philosophy ==
The Universidad del Istmo has a philosophy of cooperation and actively seeks to work with other institutions for the common good of society. This collaborative orientation is partly responsible for the name of the university, which aims to be an "isthmus" or land bridge that unites scientific research with professional practice, enduring societal values with innovation and creative spirit, domestic challenges with international ones, academia with business, and the liberal arts and humanities with modern technology.

In a speech at the inaugural academic ceremony of the university on 26 November 1997, Linda Paz Quezada, vice-rector, described the mission the university as follows:

"We aim to serve society, families and individuals by offering them a center of higher education and research, open to students of all backgrounds. We want our projects to be a link—an isthmus—between theory and practice, the humanities and the most modern technology, between our multi-ethnic and multicultural country and its problems and the process of globalization."

On 21 March 1998, in his opening address for the academic year, Dr. Carlos Llano Cifuentes further elaborated on the institution's approach to education:

"It is appropriate that the Universidad del Istmo has chosen "Know to Serve" as its motto, since this indicates the direction in which it wants to direct its education. It is a succinct but kaleidoscope-like formula, showing many perspectives, lights and edges: It is only possible to serve others if one knows, and he who can not serve others knows nothing, no matter how much he supposedly knows."

== Academic units ==
- Faculty of Architecture and Design
- Faculty of Business and Economics
- Faculty of Communication
- Faculty of Education
- Faculty of Engineering
- Faculty of Law

== Campus ==
The Santa Isabel campus of the Universidad del Istmo opened in the summer of 2015 in the region of Fraijanes, on the outskirts of Guatemala City. The 49-hectare (120-acre) site has enabled the university to consolidate its operations and provides space for future expansion to accommodate a planned student population of 6,200 by 2035. The campus includes three buildings: the Library, Rectory Building and Student Center, which house auditoriums, classrooms, oratory, workshops, industrial kitchens, cafeteria, laboratories, and student services.

The new campus was specifically designed for sustainability, with buildings oriented to use natural ventilation and light and a layout that facilitates stormwater management. Plans call for the construction of a network of academic groups arranged along a linear landscape, joined by shaded paths, and connected to the surrounding community.

The original campus, on the La Aurora estate in Zone 13 of Guatemala City, was previously home to the National School of Agriculture. It consists of a blend of modern and restored heritage buildings, and housed several of the university's professional programs. It closed on 22 March 2017, at which time all activities were relocated to the Santa Isabel campus. Afterwards, the La Aurora campus became the seat of the Ministry of Environment and Natural Resources.
