= Saint Thomas Aquinas University in Ouagadougou =

Catholic university in Burkina Faso

Saint Thomas Aquinas University
- Université Saint-Thomas-d’Aquin
- Motto: "Truth - Faith - Science"
- Type: Private university
- Established: 2004; 22 years ago
- Students: 850 (as of 2007)
- Location: Ouagadougou, Centre, Burkina Faso; 12°23′03″N 1°25′06″W
- Language: French
- Website: www.usta.bf

Saint Thomas Aquinas University (USTA) is a private university in West Africa located in Ouagadougou, the capital of Burkina Faso.

== History ==
USTA is a private Catholic institution established in October 2004. Its first rector was Professor Albert Ouédraogo, who was succeeded in September 2008 by Father Jacques Simporé

== Components ==
USTA consists of four faculties and one institute.

=== Faculties ===
- Faculty of Health Sciences (FSDS)
- Faculty of Law and Political Science (FSJP)
- Faculty of Economics and Management (FASEG)
- Faculty of Science and Technology (FAST)

=== Institute ===
- Institute of Tertiary Sciences and Professions (ISMT)

== See also ==
- Nazi Boni University
