= Catholic University of Rennes =

Coordinates: 48.0487°N 1.7449°W

The Catholic University of Rennes (Institut catholique de Rennes or ICR) is a Catholic university in Rennes, France. It was founded in 1989, and is located at the Campus de Ker Lann (Rue Blaise Pascal), about 10 km from Rennes in Bruz.
