= Catholic University of West Africa =

University in Abidjan, Ivory Coast

Coordinates: 5°19′53.1″N 3°59′47.7″W

Université catholique de l'Afrique de l'Ouest
- Motto: Foi, science, Action
- Type: Private, Catholic
- Established: 2000; 26 years ago
- Affiliation: Agence universitaire de la Francophonie
- Students: 5,819 (in 2010)
- Location: Côte d'Ivoire; Benin; Burkina Faso; Guinea; Mali; Senegal; Togo
- Language: French

Université catholique de l'Afrique de l'Ouest (UCAO) or Catholic University of West Africa was founded in 1967 as the Higher Institute of Religious Culture; later it became a university. It is situated in Abidjan, Ivory Coast. It has also campuses in Bobo-Dioulasso (Burkina Faso), Cotonou (Benin), Dakar(Senegal) and Lomé (Togo).
