= Sacred Heart University Luxembourg =

Sacred Heart University
- Motto: Inspiring Minds, Unleashing Hearts.
- Type: Private
- Active: 1991–2022
- Location: Luxembourg
- Language: English

Sacred Heart University Luxembourg (SHULU) was a branch campus of Sacred Heart University that offered graduate-level business programs in Luxembourg City. Established in 1991 and tailored to the needs of working professionals, the campus closed in 2022.

== History ==
In 1991, Henri Ahlborn, then director of the Chamber of Commerce, reached out to universities in the United States in order to find a partner institution. As a result, Sacred Heart University started offering an internationally accredited MBA program, the first of its kind in Luxembourg. During its over 30-year history, SHULU graduated 700 business students representing more than 50 countries.

== Academics ==
Program specializations included a full-time MBA program with an internship, where students received real-world experience at domestic and international companies in Luxembourg. The paid internships lasted between 6 and 9 months and came with career coaching and job placement assistance. Their part-time Executive MBA could be completed at the student's pace, typically lasting about 16 to 24 months.

They also offered graduate certificates in Private Equity, Corporate Finance, Digital Management (Blockchain & Big Data, Artificial Intelligence, and Digital Transformation).

SHULU's programs were delivered at the Chamber of Commerce in Kirchberg, in the heart of the financial sector and European institutions. All classes took place on the weekdays between 6:30 and 9:30 pm, in order to adapt to the work and family lives of students.
