= Villanueva University =

Private university in Madrid, Spain

Coordinates: 40.4960°N 3.7019°W

Universidad Villanueva
- Universidad Villanueva
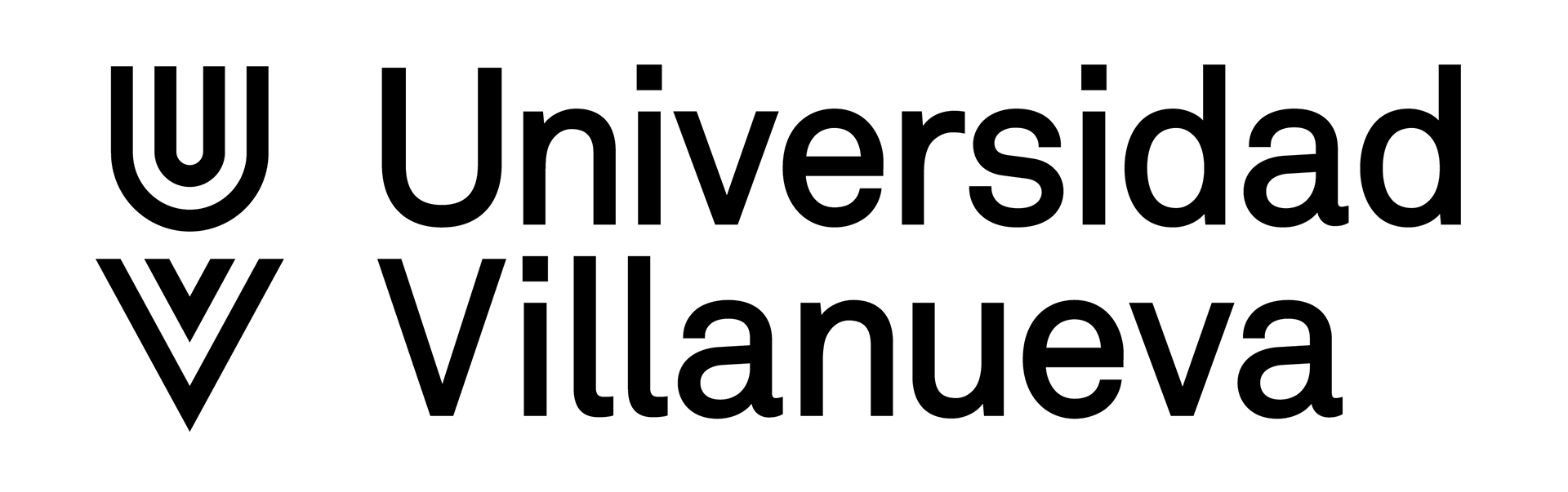
- Established: 1987
- Chancellor: José María Ortiz Ibarz
- Vice-Chancellor: Carmen Fuente Cobo y Ana Fernández-Ardavín
- Director: Pedro Irastorza Vaca
- Location: Calle de la Costa Brava, 6, 28034 Madrid See map, Madrid, Spain
- Website: www.villanueva.edu

Universidad Villanueva is a private university located in Madrid (Spain), affiliated to the Catholic organization Opus Dei. It is the smallest university in Madrid by number of bachelor's students. It started teaching in the year 2020, although its history as an institution can be traced back to 1977.

== History ==
In 1997 the Centro Universitario Villanueva was established, also attached to the Complutense University of Madrid, with a Law Degree. That same year, an agreement was reached for the incorporation of the studies of the Escuela de Magisterio de Fomento.

From 1998 to 2015, Villanueva University incorporated the studies of Psychopedagogy (1998), Journalism (2000). Advertising and Public Relations (2000), Film Studies (2001), Business Administration and Management (2014) and Psychology (2015). At that time, Master's degrees were approved, such as Access to the Legal Profession, Master's Degree in Teachers, General Health Psychology; Early Attention, Psychopedagogy and Communication of Organizations.

After 23 years of experience as a university center attached to the Complutense University of Madrid, the Decree of the Governing Council of the Community of Madrid was published on July 8, 2020, together with Law 5/2019 of March 20, 2019, its recognition as a private university, guaranteeing the solvency and maturity of the Villanueva University project, allowing it to begin its activity in the academic year 2020-2021.

== Schools and colleges ==
The university has two colleges.

=== College of Social and Legal Sciences ===
- Bachelor's degrees: Degree in Business Administration and Management, Degree in Law, Degree in Early Childhood Education Teacher, Degree in Master in Primary Education, Degree in Audiovisual Communication, Degree in Journalism, Degree in Advertising and Public Relations.
- Double degrees: Double degree in Business Administration and Management and Law, Double degree in Early Childhood and Primary Education Teacher, Double degree in Primary Education and Psychology Teacher.
- Postgraduate degrees: Master in Sports Journalism (face-to-face, online and semi-face-to-face), Master's Degree in Access to the Lawyer Profession, Master's Degree in Digital Advocacy, Entrepreneurship and Technology, Master's Degree in Teacher Training, Master's Degree in Management of Educational Centers.

=== College of Health Sciences ===
- Bachelor's degrees: Psychology.
- Postgraduate degrees: Master's Degree in Early Care, Master's Degree in Educational Psychology, Master's Degree in General Health Psychology.

== Campus ==
Its campus is made up of two buildings on the Costa Brava Street in the Mirasierra neighborhood, in the Fuencarral-El Pardo district of Madrid.
