= St. John's University (Italy) =

Coordinates: 41.910406°N 12.467164°E

St. John's University - Rome
- Type: Private
- Established: 1995
- Affiliations: Catholic Church (Vincentian)
- Location: Rome, Italy
- Campus: Urban
- Language: English
- Website: http://www.stjohns.edu/campuses/rome-campus

St. John's University - Rome is an international branch of St. John's University located in Rome, Italy and in partnership with the Holy See. The campus functions as a graduate degree-granting institution and supports undergraduate study-abroad programs.

== Campus layout ==
The campus is located on a city block in the rione of Prati and houses both academic, residential and administrative space on four floors. It is equipped with several classrooms, two large lecture halls, a student lounge, library, computer lab, and a landscaped central courtyard open to all students, faculty, and administrators. Along with 24-hour security, a residence director and graduate resident assistants live on site.

On-campus dormitory housing is available to all accepted undergraduate and graduate students. The dorms are located on the top two floors of the campus. Each dormitory room contains one or more single bed(s), desks, shelves, and closets. There are bathrooms on each floor, in addition to a student lounge equipped with a refrigerator, microwave, sink area, table, and chairs. Two full kitchens are also available for use by all dormitory students.

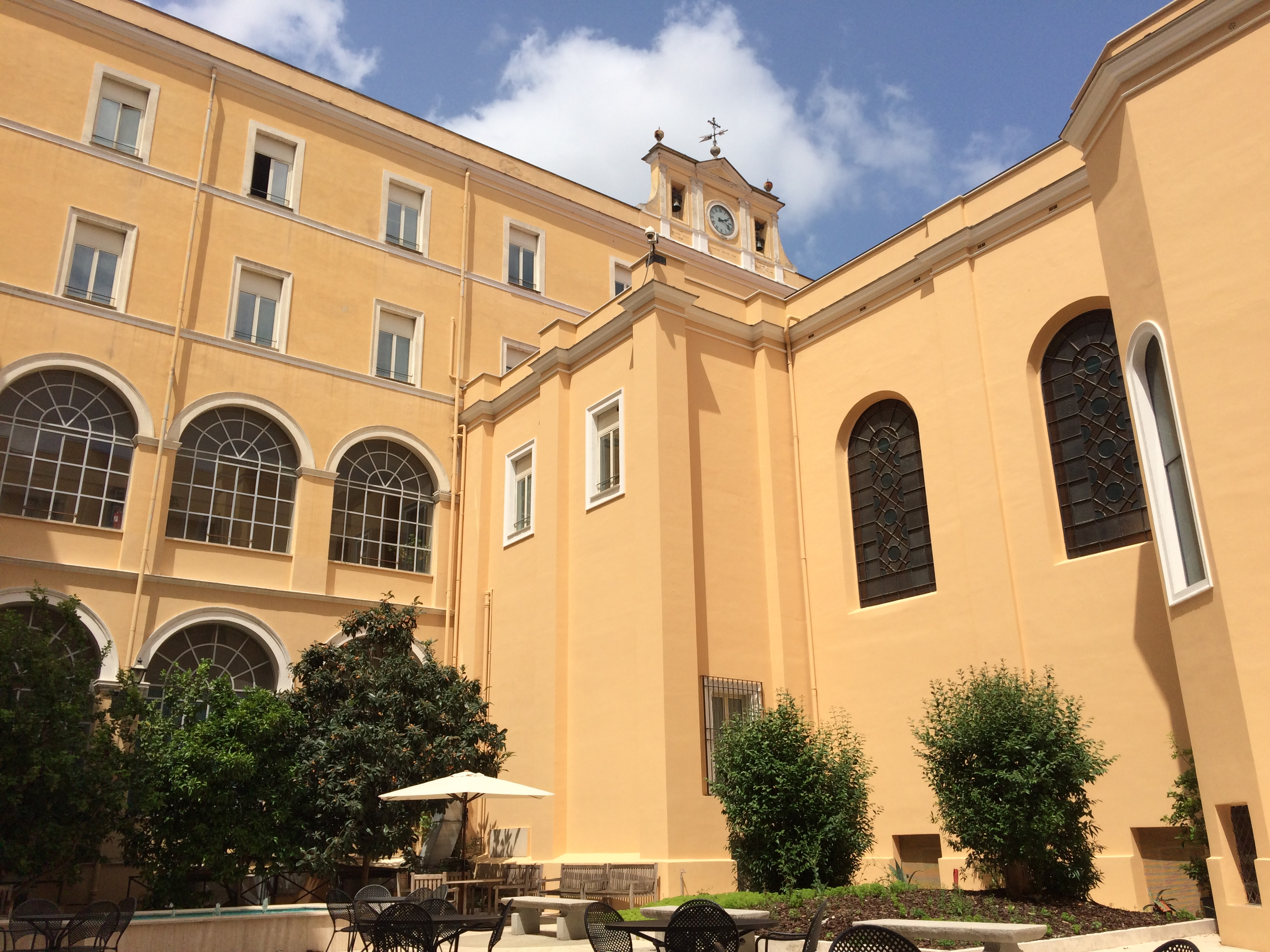
The central courtyard of St. John's University - Rome

== Undergraduate programs ==
Study abroad programs on the Rome campus are offered on the undergraduate level for fall, winter, spring and summer terms in several academic fields. Programs include but are not limited to:

Discover Italy – Undergraduate students spend one semester (Fall or Spring) living and studying in Rome.

Discover the World: Europe – Undergraduate students spend a five-week session either in the Fall or Spring semester on the Rome campus as part of international rotation which includes additional stays at St. John's University's Limerick, Ireland and Paris, France locations.

Global Passport Program – First-year undergraduate students travel to Rome for one week during the Fall or Spring semester in this embedded faculty-directed program.

Summer Session – Undergraduate students live and study in Rome for up to two sessions in the Summer term. Each session lasts approximately one month.

== Graduate programs ==
St. John's University's Rome campus currently offers the following programs leading to a graduate degree.

Master of Arts

- Government and Politics
- Global Development and Social Justice

Master of Business Administration

- International Business
- Finance
- Marketing Management
- Risk Management

Every June these program's graduates gather in the central courtyard for St. John's University's Rome Commencement Exercises.
