= Roman Catholic Faculty of Theology in Bratislava =

Coordinates: 48°08′33″N 17°06′17″E

Roman Catholic Theology Faculty of the Comenius University in Bratislava (skr. RKCMBF UK) is one of the thirteen faculties of Comenius University in Bratislava. It is the oldest existing theological faculty in the Slovak Republic. The Dean is ThDr. Ing. Vladimir Thurzo, PhD.

As part of the Communist suppression of the Catholic church, Slovak authorities closed down all the seminaries, making the Faculty in Bratislava the only training center for priests from 1950 to 1989.

== See also ==
- Archdiocese of Bratislava
