= Saint Michael Higher Technical Institute, Amparibe =

- Motto: Miorim-paka olona mba hanasoa
- Motto in English: Succeed to Help Others
- Established: 1983
- Religious affiliation: Jesuit (Roman Catholic)
- Director: Jacques Randrianary
- Location: Antananarivo, Madagascar; 18°54′55.76″S 47°31′31.43″E
- Website: a.s.m.f.free.fr/kmm.html

Saint Michael Higher Technical Institute, Amparibe, (Etablissement Technique Supérieur Saint Michel – ETS) was founded by the Jesuits in 1983 in Antananarivo, Madagascar.

It offers two academic paths:

- An undergraduate (3 years and delivering a bachelor's degree).
- A graduate (5-years delivering a master's degree)

The university offers two main programs:

- Mechanical Engineering and Industrial computing.
- Electromechanical and Industrial computing.

== History ==
On 28 March 1888 the French Jesuit superior in Madagascar determined that "the Jesuits would open a college ...that would provide the Mission with catechists and teachers, and the Hova government with officials, French collaborators, and employees." The college was named in honor of Fr. Michel Lanusse, who spent over 30 years on the Mission. The college began on land granted by King Radama II and then moved to Lake Anosy, on land that Queen Ranavalona III donated in the current area of Saint-Michel in Amparibe.

While the college began as a preserve of the elite, training many of the political and business leaders in Madagascar, it expanded its offerings over time: Elementary Mathematics (1956), Experimental Sciences (1960), coeducation (1966), and in 1983 the opening of the Higher Technical Institute (1983) on the premises.

== See also ==
- List of Jesuit schools
