= La Salle University of Chihuahua =

Coordinates: 28.6113°N 106.1242°W

The La Salle University of Chihuahua it is a university of Christian inspiration and prevailed located in the city of Chihuahua, it distributes studies of degree and masters.

== History ==
The La Salle University of Chihuahua it is a university of Christian inspiration with Lasallian charisma.

- As a university, it looks for the truth and it provides the knowledge necessary to become a professional of the highest quality.
- As a university of Christian inspiration, it proposes values, but from the practice of the same by a concrete person, Jesus of Nazareth.

La Universidad La Salle Chihuahua opened in the year 2000. It consists of a world-wide partnership with educative institutions and of international association of La Salle universities (AIUL) which includes about 157 institutions worldwide. In Chihuahua, the ULSA sinks its roots, for more than 50 years, in the presence of the Institute La Salle that has formed to countless generations.

The parents, civilian, and religious authorities are considered indispensable to give continuity to the style of education and in Primary, Secondary and High School. Since 1995, completed the steps necessary to open the Universidad La Salle.

The Executive Agreement 17 of the State on March 29, 2002 granted the official recognition of Studies (RVOE) and gives academic autonomy, organizational and administrative matters.

The 'ULSA' starts August 7, 2000 with seven novel degrees and occupational future. At the moment it offers thirteen degrees, three masters and several doctorates.

This university, located in a natural scene where three stages have been constructed already, classrooms 1 and 2, administrative offices, library, laboratories, factories and cafeteria in addition two audiences rooms of multiple uses, sport fields and stage.

This stage includes the construction of the cafeteria. The institution offers bachelor's degrees and bases its education on Christian humanism.

== Directors ==
- 2000 - 2007: Dr. José Cervantes Hernández
- 2007 - Actualidad: Dr. Salvador Valle Gámez
- 2019 - Andres Manuel Lopez Obrador
- 2022 - Tomás Turbado

== Degrees ==
| Degree | Career |
|---|---|
| Economic Management | International Trade |
| Economic Management | Finance and Accounting |
| Economic Management | Marketing |
| Humanities | Law |
| Humanities | Personnel Development |
| Humanities | Organizational Communication |
| Humanities | Family studies |
| Humanities | Languages |
| Engineering | Industrial Design |
| Engineering | Electromedical |
| Engineering | Mechatronics |
| Engineering | Industrial Quality |
| Engineering | Cybernetics |
| Engineering | Nutrition and Gastronomy |

== Masters ==
Masters
Administration
Economics & Finance
Higher Education
Quality
