= Institutos Supereriores de Ensino La Salle =

Institutos Superiores de Ensino La Salle is a private institution of higher education established in early 2002 in the State of Rio de Janeiro, Brazil, run by the Catholic religious La Salle Order, of French origin, established in Rio de Janeiro. The College offers undergraduate courses in accounting, business administration, computer science (Information Systems), history, International relations, and law, taught both in the morning and evening.

Postgraduate courses are offered on Saturday mornings in Arts, fashion design, Engineering Production, Gastronomy, Culture and Management, Management and teaching of children, ancient and medieval history, neuropsychiatry in aging, and health, exercise and aging.

It is associated with other La Salle institutions abroad and nationally, allowing study in other countries in Latin America, North America, Europe and Asia.
