= Holy Family University Center =

Coordinates: 38°0′41.9″N 3°22′47.89″W

- Predecessor: Holy Family Professional Schools
- Established: 1941; 85 years ago
- Location(s): Avda Cristo Rey 25; Úbeda, Jaen, Spain
- Director: Francisco Javier Muñoz Delgado
- Affiliations: Jesuit, Catholic; University of Jaén
- Website: SAFA

Holy Family University Center (Centro Universitario Sagrada Familia), Úbeda, is a Jesuit school founded in 1941 in Eastern Andalusia, Spain, for teacher education. It also sponsors initiatives for the advancement of education for peoples of all cultures and economic strata, at times through the independent SAFA Foundation. It is affiliated with the University of Jaén.

== Chronology ==
In 1940 Rafael Villoslada Peula founded Professional Schools of the "Sagrada Familia" for the education of the lower classes in Andalusia, and for war orphans throughout Spain. The next year he opened the Center SAFA Ubeda, on San Fernando Street Corredera # 7. By 1944 it had 24 students in teacher training at the center of Villanueva del Arzobispo.

The Primary Education Act of 1945 fostered "national Catholicism". In 1948 teachers' classes moved to the Center at Ubeda, with 64 students. In 1949 Bishop Rafael Garcia entrusted to the Society of Jesus "Sagrada Familia" School of Education, with approval also by the Archbishop of Valencia who was president of the Episcopal Commission for Education, and with recognition from the Ministry of Education.

In 1950 a new curriculum was devised in line with Article 31 of the Act for Normal Schools, then in 1959 profound changes were necessitated due to government directives requiring four years of study, and that entrants must graduate from elementary school or its equivalent.

By the Primary Education Act of 1967, the Baccalaureate Plan is required for admission to teachers' studies, which would last three years. From 1968 the Bishop and the Episcopal Commission issued permits for students to enter the program.

The General Education Law (Law Villar Palasí) of 1970 made primary education free and compulsory. In 1973 SAFA was authorized to award university degrees in humanities, Spanish and modern languages, and sciences. In 1978 "Sagrada Familia" University School was recognized as a school for primary teachers affiliated with the University of Granada. In 1982 specialty preschool was authorized.

In 2015 SAFA considered the request of University of Jaen that it offer a double degree in elementary education and social education, and the following year the Chair of Ethics and Social Responsibility was founded.

== Directors ==
- 1941 – Rafael Villoslada Peula
- 1974 – Don Guillermo Rodriguez Izquierdo
- 1979 – Don Fermin Camacho Evangelista
- 1987 – Manuel Rodriguez Gallego199
- 1993 – Arturo Ruiz Rodríguez
- 1994 – Don Salvador Cruz Artacho
- 2001 – Francisco Javier Muñoz Delgado

== See also ==
- List of Jesuit sites
