= Catholic University of Dry Tropic Farming and Livestock =

University in Esteli, Nicaragua

Catholic University of Dry Tropic Farming and Livestock (UCATSE)
- Universidad Católica Agropecuaria del Trópico Seco (UCATSE)
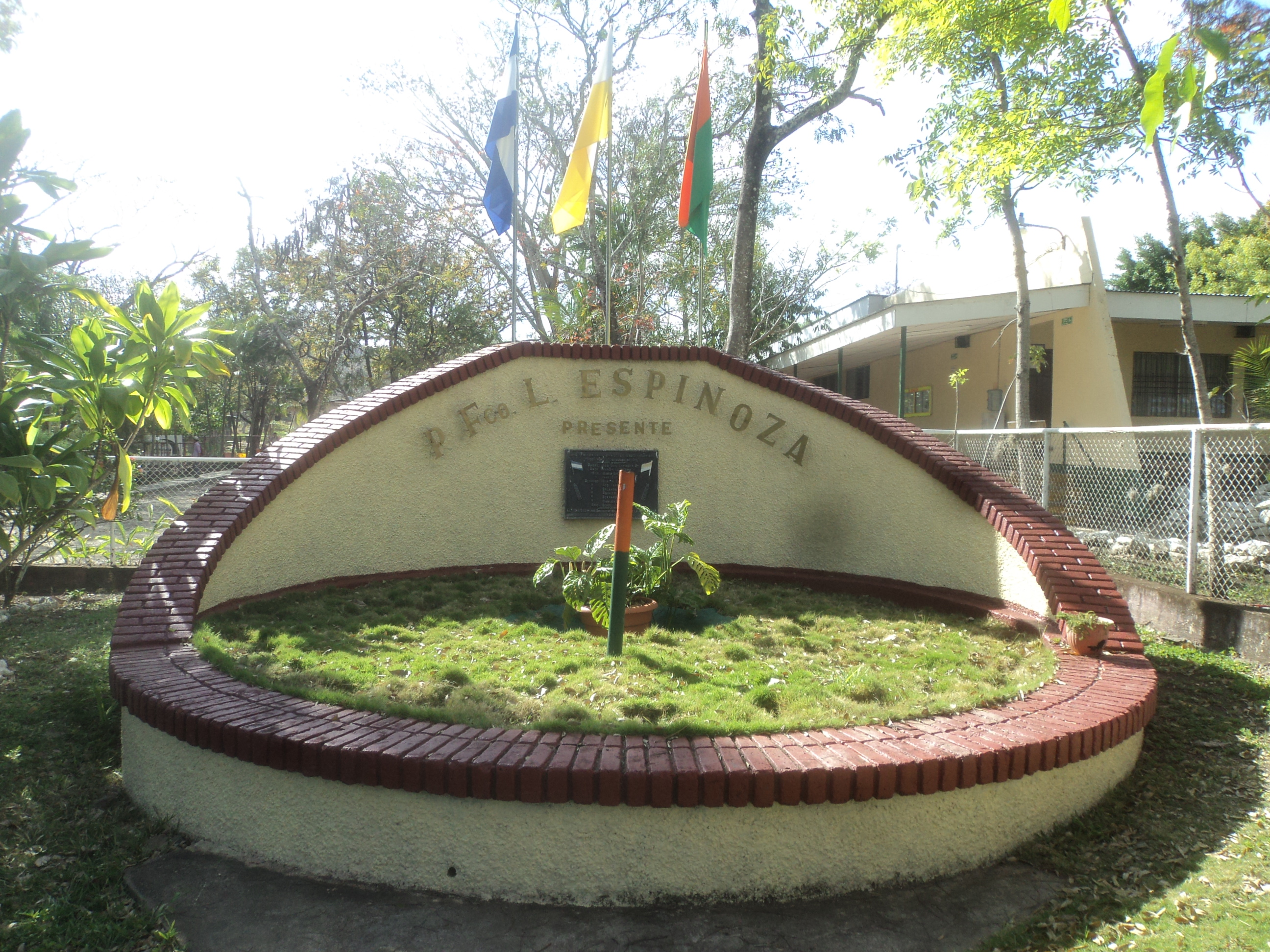
- Other names: UCATSE
- Type: Private
- Established: 1974
- Rector: Mgr. Juan Abelardo Mata Guevara
- Location: Estelí, Nicaragua]
- Website: www.ucatse.edu.ni

The Catholic University of Dry Tropic Farming and Livestock (Spanish: Universidad Católica Agropecuaria del Trópico Seco (UCATSE)) is a private catholic university located in Estelí, Nicaragua. It was founded in 1974 and is a member of the National University Council (Consejo Nacional de Universidades, CNU).

The university is named after Presbyter Francisco Luis Espinoza Pineda, the founder of the School of Farming and Livestock of Estelí (EAGE), precursor of the UCATSE.
