= St. Thomas University, Japan =

Christian private university in Amagasaki, Hyoko, Japan

Coordinates: 34°44′58″N 135°26′17″E

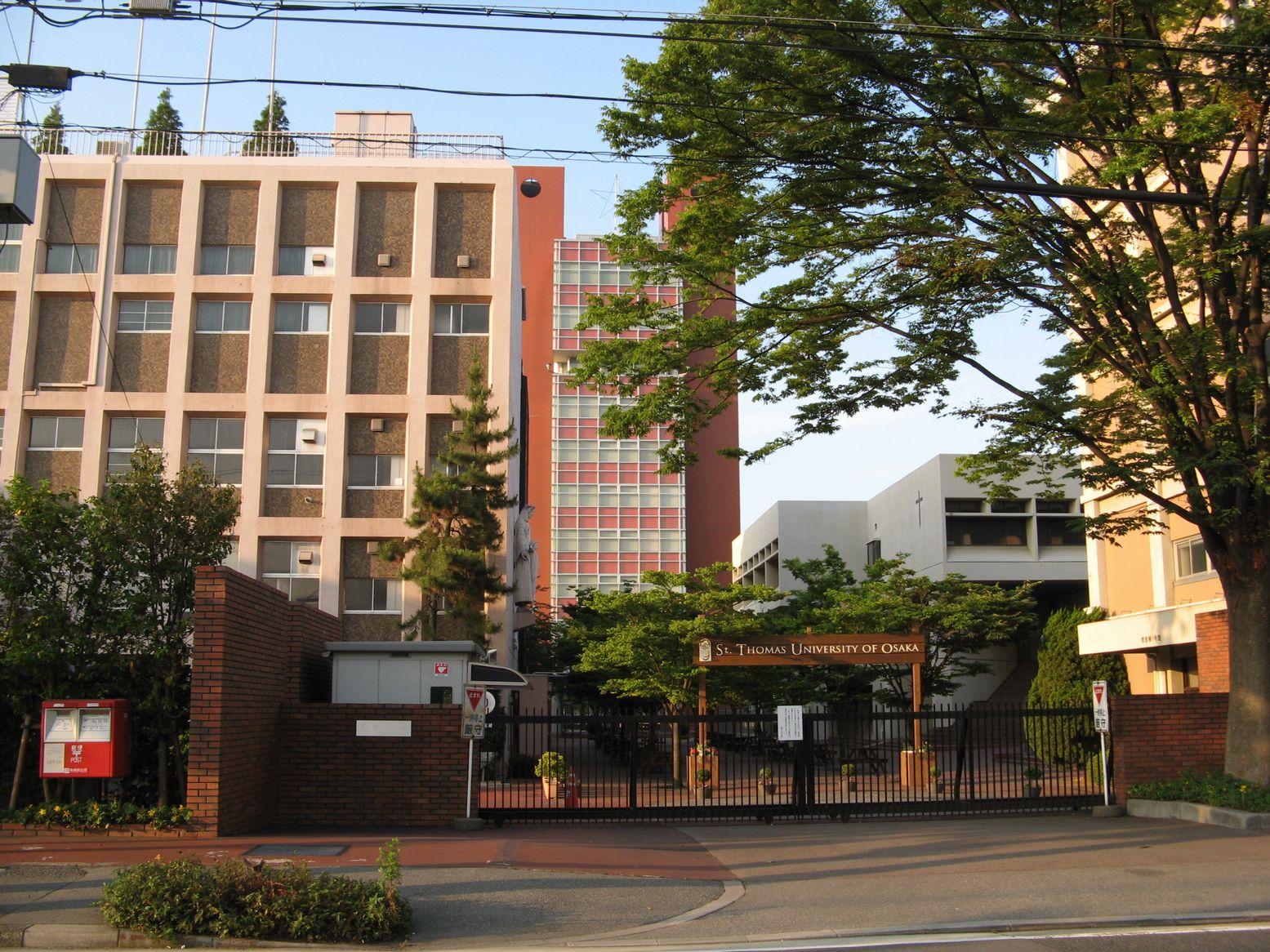
St.Thomas University, Japan

St.Thomas University, Japan (聖トマス大学, Sei tomasu daigaku), formerly known as Sapientia University or Eichi University (英知大学, Eichi daigaku), was a Christian private university in Amagasaki, Hyogo, Japan. The school was founded in 1962 as a junior college and became a four-year college in the following year. The name "St. Thomas University" was adopted in 2007. The university stopped enrolling new students in 2010 and, after its last remaining student graduated in 2014, announced its closure and revealed its intention to donate its facilities to the city of Amagasaki.

== Sister Schools ==
- University of Santo Tomas, España, Manila
- Aquinas University of Legazpi, Rawis, Legazpi City
