= Catholic University of Trujillo =

Private University in Peru

Coordinates: 8.1602°S 79.0112°W

- Universidad Católica de Trujillo
- Type: Private
- Established: November 30, 2000
- Rector: Alcibíades Helí Miranda Chávez
- Location: Panamericana highway km 555; Trujillo, Trujillo, Peru
- Website: www.uct.edu.pe

Catholic University of Trujillo (Spanish: Universidad Católica de Trujillo) is a Peruvian private university located in Trujillo, Peru. It was born as an initiative of the Archdiocese of Trujillo on December 12, 1999, from the Archbishop of Trujillo, Héctor Miguel Cabrejos Vidarte. The operation of the university was authorized by resolution UCT 147-2000-CONAFU on November 30, 2000, and academic activities began on January 2, 2001.

== See also ==
- National University of Trujillo
- Cesar Vallejo University
- Private University of the North
