= University of Agricultural Engineering =

Coordinates: 41°36′14.88″N 4°47′34.18″W

- Abbreviation: INEA
- Predecessor: Nevares Institute of Agricultural Employers
- Established: 1964; 62 years ago
- Location(s): Camino Viejo de Simancas, km. 4,5, Valladolid, Spain
- director: Pedro Piedras
- Affiliations: Jesuit, Catholic; University of Valladolid
- Website: INEA

University of Agricultural Engineering, Valladolid, is a university run by the Society of Jesus which began in 1964 as the Nevares Institute of Agricultural Employers (INEA). It was an school affiliated with the University of Valladolid until 2017. Since 2025, is an integral part of the Comillas Pontifical University.

== History ==
The Nevares Institute of Agricultural Employers (INEA) was founded in 1964 in Valladolid by Jose Fernandez Quintanilla, as a response to the absence of people with entrepreneurial training in the farming community. The institute was named after the Sisinio Nevares who founded Catholic Trade Unions in the 1930s.

In 1965 the Institute received Ministerial recognition and was attached to the School of Agronomists of Madrid, for its three-year undergraduate course. The course was called Intermediate Level in Agricultural Engineering in Management of Agricultural Companies until 1981 when the INEA became affiliated with the University of Valladolid. In these first 16 years it had educated 1,960 students. From the start in 1965 INEA offered distance learning classes, accommodating 2,675 students by 1992. From 1977 until 1990 the school also graduated 240 students in vocational training ("First Grade Agrario") in agriculture.

Nowadays, it is an school integrated in the Comillas Pontifical University, teaching several degrees regarding sustainable agriculture, engenneering applied to agriculture or management of farming companies

== See also ==
- List of Jesuit sites
