= Mechatronics Polytechnic of Sanata Dharma =

Coordinates: 7°45′19.21″S 110°25′21.52″E

- Yogyakarta, Indonesia

Information
- Type: Jesuit, Catholic
- Denomination: All faiths
- Established: 2011; 15 years ago
- Staff: 23 lecturers
- Gender: Coeducational
- Website: www.pmsd.ac.id

Mechatronics Polytechnic of Sanata Dharma (PMSD) grew out of the Jesuit Sanata Dharma University in Yogyakarta, Indonesia, and became a separate institution in 2011.

== Courses ==
Mechatronics Polytechnic of Sanata Dharma offers diploma courses in Mechatronics, Medical Instrumentation, and Mechatronics Product Design. Practice is emphasized over theory, with two-thirds of class time spent in actual practice. The aim is to furnish job-ready graduates in both automated and medical applications, in line with increased industrial automation and health needs in Indonesia.

PMSD is a member of the Indonesian section of the Institute of Electrical and Electronics Engineers (OEEE).

== See also ==
- List of Jesuit sites
