= La Salle College of Lucas do Rio Verde =

Coordinates: 13.07189°S 55.94384°W

Faculdade La Salle of Lucas do Rio Verde
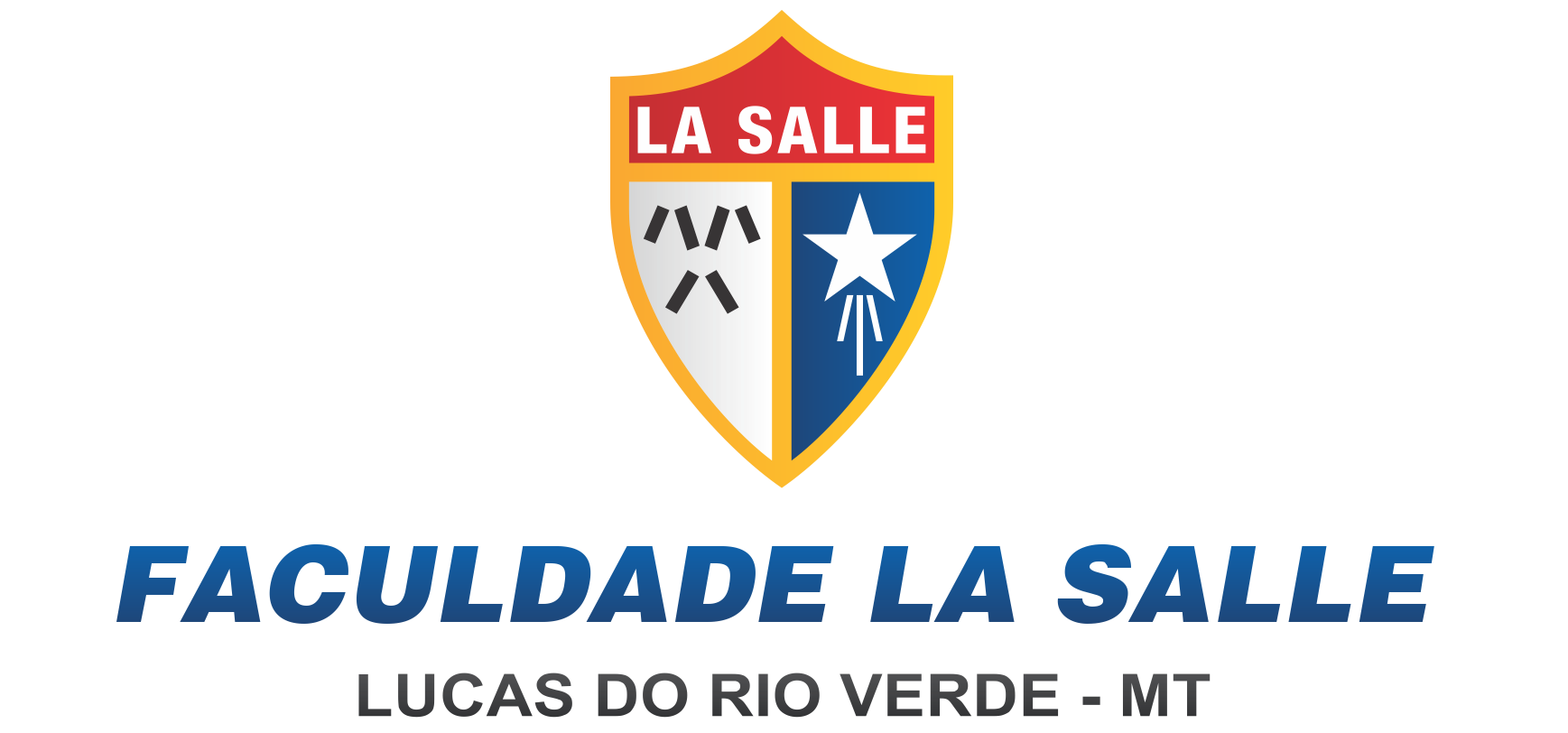
- Motto: Ser Global é Ser La Salle! (Portuguese)
- Motto in English: Being Global is Being La Salle!
- Type: Private
- Established: June 15, 1999
- Director: Nelso Antonio Bordignon
- Location: Lucas do Rio Verde, Mato Grosso, Brazil
- Campus: Urban
- Colors: Blue and white
- Website: www.faculdadelasalle.edu.br

The La Salle College of Lucas do Rio Verde (Portuguese: Faculdade La Salle de Lucas do Rio Verde) is a Brazilian private college located to the north of Mato Grosso in Lucas do Rio Verde, Brazil.
