= Higher Institute of Humanistic and Philosophical Studies =

Jesuit seminary in Paraguay

- Abbreviation: ISEHF
- Predecessor: Center for Preparatory & Humanistic Studies of the Society of Jesus
- Established: 1978; 48 years ago
- Location: Itapúa 148, Asunción, Paraguay
- Director: Gabriel Insaurralde
- Affiliations: Jesuit, Catholic
- Website: ISEHF

Higher Institute of Humanistic and Philosophical Studies (ISEHF) has been training Jesuits in preparation for the priesthood since 1978. Since 1997 it has offered to the public degrees in philosophy and education. In 2015 it began offering the Master of Educational Administration and Management.

== History ==
ISEHF is a teaching and research center. It grew out of the school of philosophy (CEPHSI) launched in 1978. A philosophy degree is granted through the Catholic University "Our Lady of the Assumption," and since 2000 the Ministry of Education and Culture has authorized ISEHF to grant the titles Professor of Philosophy, of Ethics, and of Citizenship Education. ISEHF is a member of AUSJAL (Association of Universities Entrusted to the Society of Jesus in Latin America).

== See also ==
- List of Jesuit sites
