= Saint Ignatius Jesuit College of Excellence =

Saint Ignatius Jesuit College for Advanced Studies
- Szent Ignác Jezsuita Szakkollégium
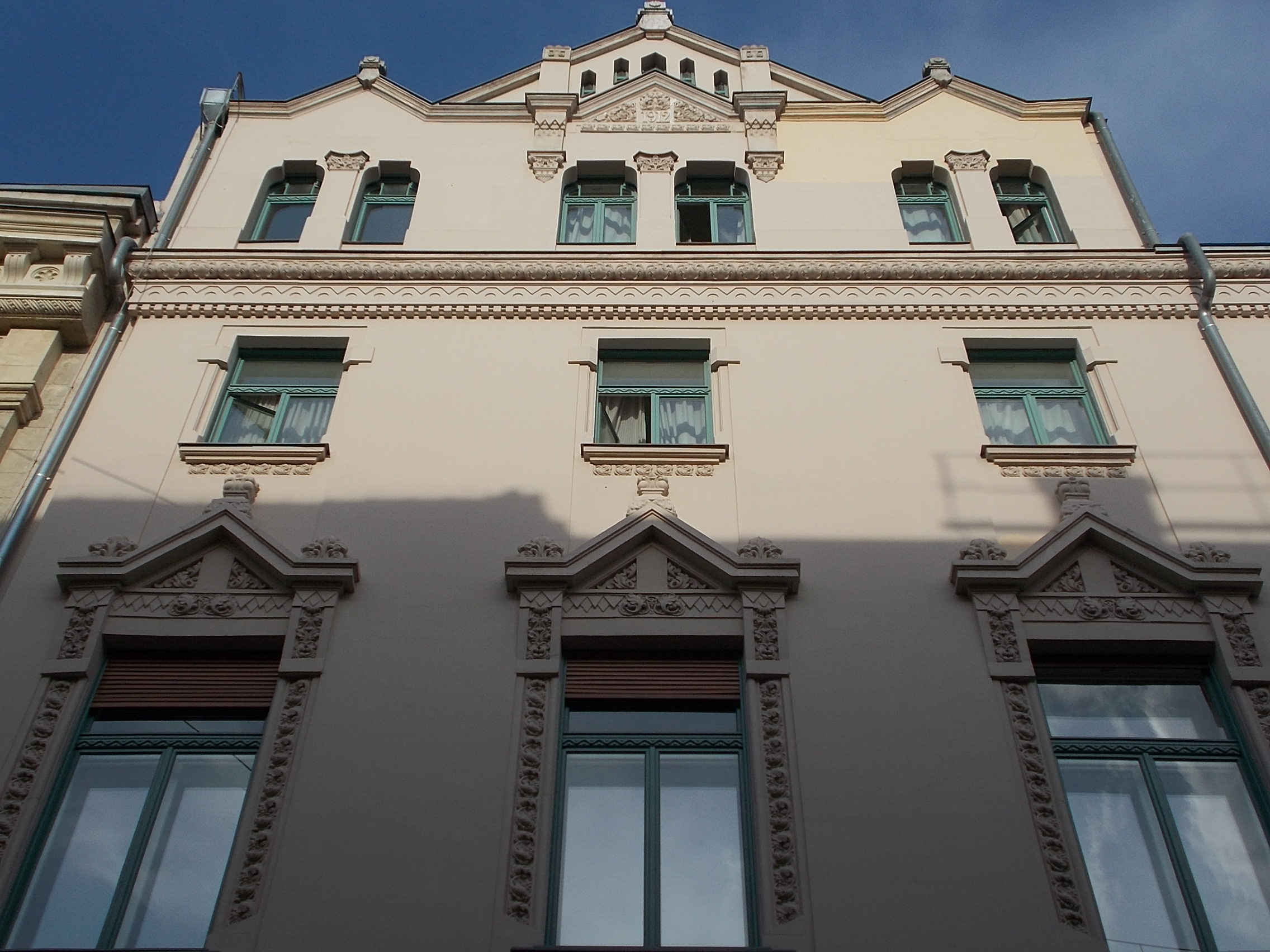

Location
- 18 Horánszky street Budapest, Hungary; 47.491306°N 19.06789°E

Information
- Established: 1990
- Rector: Gábor Nevelős SJ
- Number of students: 65
- Website: https://www.szentignac.hu/en

The Saint Ignatius Jesuit College for Advanced Studies (in Hungarian: Szent Ignác Jezsuita Szakkollégium (SZIK)) in district VIII of Budapest, Hungary, is a college of excellence established in 1990. It is run by the Hungarian Jesuits. Every year, it has approximately 60 members of which 15–20 are exchanged at the end of the academic year due to graduations and admissions. The four key values of SZIK are professionalism, spirituality, community and social responsibility, along with self-government, which is not officially part of these four pillars.

== History of SZIK ==
In September 1990 a few enthusiastic college students formed the first community, which became the founding team of the future college. The institution did not have a building at that time, thus in order to acquire one, a property of the disbanded Kispest Workers' Militia was tendered and won.

In search for a long-term maintainer, the choice fell on the St. Martin's Foundation, which was committed to promoting the education of the youth and later took on the role of maintainer. Shortly after, the Jesuit order has taken on the responsibility of the maintainer in 2000, as the students wanted to be provided spiritual care.

The order appointed Szabolcs Sajgó SJ (who was editor of the spirituality magazine called Szív at the time) as the first pastor of the dormitory, who also held the position of director later for three years. After a two-year break, a Jesuit called László Vértesaljai SJ became the director, followed by Ulrich Kiss SJ, which helped the relationship between the college and the order to deepen. On 20 August 1998, János Ádám SJ, Provincial Superior decided that the Society of Jesus Foundation would assume responsibility for the College. With the appointment of the Jesuit rector Ulrich Kiss SJ in 2005, another decision was made to add the adjective “Jesuit” to the name of the college. In the autumn of 2011, the College moved to Horánszky Street under the direction of Rector Dr. Péter Smuk. Between 2012 and 2017, Dr. Botond Feledy served as rector. From September 2017 until June 2022, the head of the college was Balázs Sárvári, followed by Rector Gábor Nevelős SJ. In 2025, the Saint Ignatius Jesuit College for Advanced Studies had its 35th jubilee in memory of the 1990 foundation. From September 2025, several events were held to celebrate the three decade long history and achievements of the institution.

== Organization and operation ==
The college is maintained by the Jesuit Order in Hungary through the Society of Jesus Foundation. The foundation's board of trustees appoints the rector and the members of the college's supervisory board. The College Supervisory Board approves the college's Organizational and Operational Regulations (SZMSZ) and accepts the Administration's report. The Administration coordinates the work of the Student Council and the institution's employees, and represents the college to the Jesuit Order. The Student Council is the representative body of the college students, organizes the work of the teams, and prepares the General Assembly. The General Assembly is the direct forum for college students to influence the affairs of the college, of which every college student is a member.

== Sources ==
- SZIK english website
- SZIK about us

== See also ==
- List of Jesuit sites
