= Luis Espinal Higher Institute of Philosophy and Humanities =

Coordinates: 17°22′56.05″S 66°9′22.28″W

- Type: Jesuit, Catholic
- Established: 2003; 23 years ago
- Rector: Luis Palomera
- Director: Rodrigo Mita
- Location: Calle Oruro No. 426, Cochabamba, Bolivia

Luis Espinal Higher Institute of Philosophy and Humanities (Instituto Superior de Filosofía y Humanidades "Luis Espinal") is a Jesuit-run university in Cochabamba, Bolivia.

The Institute is named after Luís Espinal Camps, a Jesuit priest, poet, educator, and social justice activist.

== See also ==
- List of Jesuit sites
