= Universidad Católica de Santo Tomás de Villanueva =

Coordinates: 23.08897°N 82.46258°W

Universidad Católica de Santo Tomás de Villanueva (St. Thomas of Villanova Catholic University) was a private Roman Catholic university founded on August 15, 1946, in Havana, Cuba. It was founded by American Augustinians with assistance from European Augustinians and named after Saint Thomas of Villanova. In 1957, it was declared a pontifical university. In 1961, the Augustinians were expelled from Cuba and the university was confiscated by the Cuban government.

Former members of its faculty later helped found Biscayne College, now St. Thomas University, in Miami Gardens, Florida.

In 2007, a group of Catholic university students presented a petition to the Cuban government asking for the Universidad Católica de Santo Tomás de Villanueva to reopen.

== See also ==
- St. Thomas University (Florida)
