= Facultades de Filosofía y Teología de San Miguel =

Jesuit university in San Miguel, Argentina

Coordinates: 34.557347°S 58.730950°W

- Philosophical and Theological Faculty of San Miguel
- Established: 1918; 108 years ago
- Religious affiliation: Roman Catholic; Jesuit seminary
- Other students: Bachelors, licentiate, doctorate philosophy & theology
- Location: San Miguel, Buenos Aires Province, Argentina
- Campus: USAL Universidad del Salvador Centro Loyola

Facultades de Filosofía y Teología de San Miguel (English: Philosophical and Theological Faculty of San Miguel) is a Jesuit university and seminary in San Miguel, Buenos Aires Province, Argentina.

== History ==
San Miguel was initially founded in 1918 in Santa Fe and in 1923 was moved to Buenos Aires. The university has two campuses, USAL Universidad del Salvador and Centro Loyola.

In 1932, the university received authorization from the Holy See to award ecclesiastical degrees in philosophy and theology, from bachelor through licentiate and doctorate. For many years it was the only university in South America authorized to confer pontifical degrees in philosophy and theology, and so drew students from Argentina, Uruguay, Paraguay, Bolivia, Chile, Peru, Brazil, and Mexico.

== Francis connection ==
Jorge Bergoglio, who later became Pope Francis, attended the school from 1967 to 1970, studying theology at the Faculty of Theology "San José" School of San Miguel, where he had received a licentiate in philosophy and now received also a licentiate in theology. While master of novices at Villa Barilari in San Miguel (1972–1973), he served as a professor in the Faculty of Theology and rector of the College, until he became Provincial Superior of the Argentine Jesuits in 1973.

== See also ==
- List of Jesuit sites
