= Catholic University Redemptoris Mater =

Catholic University, Nicaragua, 1992

Coordinates: 12.08277°N 86.23039°W

- Universidad Católica Redemptoris Mater (UNICA)
- Other names: UNICA
- Motto: Sedes Sapientiae
- Motto in English: Seat of Wisdom
- Type: Private
- Established: 1992
- Academic affiliations: AUPRICA; ODUCAL
- Rector: Michelle Rivas de Molina
- Location: Managua, Nicaragua
- Website: www.unica.edu.ni

The Catholic University Redemptoris Mater (Spanish: Universidad Católica Redemptoris Mater (UNICA)) is a private university in Managua, Nicaragua. It was founded in 1992 by Cardinal Miguel Obando y Bravo.

UNICA is a member of AUPRICA, the Association of Private Universities of Central America and Panama and ODUCAL, the Organization of Latin American Catholic Universities.
