= Ecclesiastical university =

Type of university

An ecclesiastical university is a special type of higher education school recognised by the Canon law of the Catholic Church. It is one of two types of universities recognised, the other type being the Catholic university. Every single ecclesiastical university is a pontifical university, while only a few Catholic universities are pontifical.

Some independent institutions, schools or university faculties, even at non-pontifical universities, can be ecclesiastical institutes, ecclesiastical schools or ecclesiastical faculties and may also be given charters by the Holy See to grant ecclesiastical degrees, usually in one or two specific fields.

Ecclesiastical universities are licensed to grant ecclesiastical degrees in:

- Theology, including biblical studies and Church history
- Ecclesiastical Philosophy
- Canon Law

These ecclesiastical degrees are prerequisites to certain offices in the Roman Catholic Church, especially considering that bishop candidates are selected mainly from priests who are doctors of sacred theology (S.T.D.) or canon law (J.C.D.) and that ecclesiastical judges and attorneys must at least be licentiates of canon law (J.C.L.).

== Ecclesiastical universities and faculties ==
Ecclesiastical universities and faculties
Faculty	University	City	Country	Notes
Facultades de Filosofía y Teología de San Miguel		San Miguel	Argentina	
Catholic Institute of Sydney		Sydney	Australia	
Faculdade Jesuíta de Filosofia e Teologia		Belo Horizonte	Brazil	
Catholic Institute of Yaoundé	Catholic University of Central Africa	Yaoundé	Cameroon	
Faculté de Théologie et de Sciences Religieuses	Université Laval	Québec	Canada	
Pontifical Institute of Mediaeval Studies		Toronto	Canada	It uniquely among all ecclesiastical faculties grants the licentiate in Medieval Studies (L.M.S., a post-doctorate earned degree), and the doctorate (M.S.D.) which is awarded on the basis of a career. It is an independent research institute at the University of Toronto.
Regis College	University of Toronto	Toronto	Canada	
	Pontifical Catholic University of Chile	Santiago	Chile	
	Pontifical Catholic University of Valparaíso	Valparaíso	Chile	
Facultés Catholiques de Kinshasa		Kinshasa	Democratic Republic of the Congo	
Faculty of Catholic Theology	University of Zagreb	Zagreb	Croatia	
Seminario Pontificio Santo Tomás de Aquino		Santo Domingo	Dominican Republic	
Centre Sèvres - Facultés Théologique et Philosophique des Jésuites		Paris	France	
Faculté de Théologie et de Philosophie	Université Catholique de Lyon	Lyon	France	
Faculté de Théologie	Université Catholique de l'Ouest	Angers	France	
Faculté de Théologie	Université Catholique de Lille	Lille	France	
Faculté de Théologie Notre-Dame		Paris	France	
Sankt Georgen Graduate School of Philosophy and Theology		Frankfurt	Germany	
Holy Spirit Seminary College of Theology and Philosophy			Hong Kong, China	
Faculty of Theology	Pázmány Péter Catholic University	Budapest	Hungary	
Jnana Deepa, Institute of Philosophy and Theology		Pune	India	
Pontifical Athenaeum Dharmaram Vidya Kshetram		Bengaluru	India	
St. Peter's Pontifical Institute of Philosophy and Theology		Bengaluru	India	
Wedabhakti Pontifical Faculty of Theology		Yogyakarta	Indonesia	
St Patrick's College, Maynooth			Ireland	
École Biblique et Archéologique Française de Jérusalem		Jerusalem	Israel	
Pontificium Institutum Biblicum		Jerusalem	Israel	
Studium Biblicum Franciscanum		Jerusalem	Israel	
Studium Theologicum Salesianum		Jerusalem	Israel	
Pontifical Institute "John Paul II" for Marriage and Family Sciences		Rome	Italy	
Pontifical Institute of Arab and Islamic Studies		Rome	Italy	
Pontifical Institute of Christian Archaeology		Rome	Italy	
Pontifical Institute of Sacred Music		Rome	Italy	
Pontifical Institute of Ambrosian Sacred Music		Milan	Italy	
Pontifical Faculty of Education "Auxilium"		Rome	Italy	
Pontifical Faculty of Theology and Institute of Spirituality "Teresianum"		Rome	Italy	
Pontifical Theological Faculty "Marianum"		Rome	Italy	
Pontifical Theological Faculty of St. Bonaventure "Seraphicum"		Rome	Italy	
Pontifical Institute for Biblical Studies "Biblicum"		Rome	Italy	
Pontifical Institute for Eastern Studies "Orientale"		Rome	Italy	
Pontifical Institute for Patristic Sciences "Augustinianum"		Rome	Italy	
Pontifical Institute of Theology of Consecrated Life "Claretianum"		Rome	Italy	
Pontifical Institute of Moral Theology "Accademia Alfonsiana"		Rome	Italy	
Pontifical Institute for Pastoral Ministry "Redemptor Hominis"		Rome	Italy	
Pontifical Institute of Latinitas		Rome	Italy	
Pontifical Institute of Sacred Liturgy		Rome	Italy	
Pontifical Institute of Utriusque Iuris		Rome	Italy	
Pontifical Theological Faculty of Southern Italy		Naples	Italy	
Pontifical Theological Faculty of Sardinia		Cagliari	Italy	
Pontifical Theological Faculty of Sicily «San Giovanni Evangelista»		Palermo	Italy	
Theological Faculty of Apulia		Bari	Italy	
Theological Faculty of Central Italy		Florence	Italy	
Theological Faculty of Emilia-Romagna		Bologna	Italy	
Theological Faculty of Northern Italy, Milan, Turin, Genoa			Italy	
Faculty of Canon Law «San Pio X»		Venice	Italy	
«Sophia» University Institute		Loppiano	Italy	
Academic Theological Study Bressanone		Brixen	Italy	Affiliated with the Faculty of Theology of the University of Innsbruck in Austria

=== Lebanon ===
- Faculté de Théologie, Université Saint-Esprit de Kaslik, Jounieh

=== Malta ===
- Faculty of Theology, Tal-Virtù

=== Nigeria ===
- Catholic Institute of West Africa, Port Harcourt

=== Philippines ===
- Loyola School of Theology, Ateneo de Manila University, Quezon City

=== Poland ===
- Pontifical Faculty of Theology in Warsaw, Warsaw
- Pontifical Faculty of Theology in Wrocław, Wrocław
- Pontifical University of John Paul II, Kraków

=== Spain ===
- Ateneo Universitario Sant Pacià, Barcelona
- Universidad Eclesiástica San Dámaso, Madrid
- Faculty of Canon Law (at Universidad Católica de Valencia San Vicente Martir), Valencia
- Faculty of Theology (at Universidad de Deusto), Bilbao
- Faculty of Theology (at Universidad Loyola Andalucía), Granada
- Faculty of Theology "San Esteban," Salamanca
- Faculty of Theology "San Isidoro de Sevilla," Sevilla
- Faculty of Theology "San Vicente Ferrer," Valencia
- Theological Faculty of Northern Spain - Burgos Campus
- Theological Faculty of Northern Spain - Vitoria Campus

=== Switzerland ===
- Faculty of Theology (at Université de Fribourg), Fribourg
- Faculty of Theology (at Università di Lucerna), Lucerne
- Faculty of Theology (at Università della Svizzera italiana), Lugano
- Theological School of Chur (German: Theologische Hochschule Chur), Chur

=== Taiwan ===
- Fu Jen Faculty of Theology of St. Robert Bellarmine, New Taipei City

=== United Kingdom ===
- Mater Ecclesiae College of St Mary's University, Twickenham, formerly the Bellarmine Institute of Heythrop College, University of London

=== United States ===
- Boston College School of Theology and Ministry (at Boston College), Brighton, MA
- Ecclesiastical Faculty of Theology (at the University of Saint Mary of the Lake), Mundelein, IL
- Jesuit School of Theology of Santa Clara University (at Santa Clara University), Berkeley, CA
- Pontifical Faculty of the Immaculate Conception (at the Dominican House of Studies), Washington, DC
- St. Mary's Seminary and University, Baltimore, MD
- The Catholic University of America (CUA), Washington, DC

Additionally, numerous other United States institutions have arrangements by which they may grant pontifical degrees, including:

- Archdiocese of New York's St. Joseph's Seminary, Dunwoodie, Yonkers, NY – offers the S.T.B. through the Pontifical University of St. Thomas Aquinas (Angelicum) in Rome, Italy.
- Kenrick–Glennon Seminary, Shrewsbury, MO - offers the S.T.B. through the Pontifical Gregorian University in Rome, Italy.
- Mount Angel Abbey's Seminary, Saint Benedict, OR - offers the S.T.B. through the Pontifical Atheneum of St. Anselm in Rome, Italy.
- Mount St. Mary's University Seminary, Emmitsburg, MD - offers the S.T.B. through the Pontifical Faculty of the Immaculate Conception.
- Sacred Heart Major Seminary, Detroit, MI - offers both the S.T.B. and S.T.L through the Pontifical University of St. Thomas Aquinas (Angelicum) in Rome, Italy
- Saint Patrick's Seminary and University, Menlo Park, CA - offers the S.T.B. through the Pontifical Faculty of the Immaculate Conception.
- Pontifical College Josephinum, Columbus, OH - offers the S.T.B. through the Pontifical University of St. Thomas Aquinas (Angelicum) in Rome, Italy.

== Ecclesiastical faculties ==
=== Africa ===
- Dar Comboni for Arabic Studies of Cairo, Cairo, Egypt
- Faculty of Theology, Catholic University of West Africa
- Catholic University of Central Africa, Yaoundé, Cameroon
  - Department of Canon Law
  - Faculty of Theology
  - Faculty of Philosophy
  - Faculty of Social Sciences and Management
- Catholic University of Congo, Kinshasa, Democratic Republic of the Congo
  - Faculty of Canon Law
  - Faculty of Philosophy
  - Faculty of Theology
- Catholic University of Madagascar
  - Faculty of Philosophy
  - Faculty of Theology
- Veritas University, Abuja, Nigeria
  - Faculty of Ecclesiastical Theology
  - Faculty of Ecclesiastical Philosophy
- Faculty of Theology, Catholic University of Eastern Africa, Nairobi, Kenya
- Faculty of Theology of the Jesuits in Africa and Madagascar (FTJAM), Hekima University College, Nairobi, Kenya

=== America, North ===
==== Canada ====
- Faculty of Theology, Dominican University College, Ottawa, Ontario
- Faculty of Theology and Religious Studies, Université Laval, Quebec City, Quebec
- Saint Paul University, Ottawa, Ontario
  - Faculty of Canon Law
  - Faculty of Theology
- The Ecclesiastical Faculty of Theology at St. Augustine's Seminary, Toronto

==== Latin America and Caribbean-West Indies ====
- Instituto De Estudios Ecclesiasticos Padre Felix Varela, Havana, Cuba
- Universidad Pontificia de México
  - School of Canon Law
  - School of Theology
  - School of Philosophy

==== United States ====
- Ecclesiastical Faculty of Theology, Boston College, Massachusetts
- Catholic University of America
  - School of Canon Law
  - School of Philosophy
  - School of Theology and Religious Studies
- St. Mary's Seminary and University, Baltimore, Maryland
- Pontifical Faculty of Theology, University of Saint Mary of the Lake, Mundelein, IL
- Pontifical Faculty of the Immaculate Conception, Washington, D.C.
- Jesuit School of Theology of Santa Clara University, Berkeley, California

=== America, South ===
- Catholic University of Córdoba, Argentina
  - Faculty of Philosophy and Humanities
  - Faculty of Theology
- Pontifical Catholic University of Argentina
- Bolivian Catholic University San Pablo, Bolivia
- Jesuit Faculty of Philosophy and Theology, Belo Horizonte, Brazil
  - Faculty of Theology
  - Faculty of Philosophy
- Faculty of Theology, Pontifical Catholic University of Rio de Janeiro, Brazil
- Faculdade de Direito Canônico São Paulo Apóstolo (Faculty of Canon Law Saint Paul the Apostle), São Paulo, Brazil
- Faculty of Theology, Pontifical Catholic University of Chile, Santiago de Chile, Chile
- Ecclesiastical Faculty of Theology – Institute of Religious Studies, Pontifical Catholic University of Valparaíso, Valparaíso, Chile
- Pontificia Universidad Javeriana (Xavierian Pontifical University), Bogotá D.C., Colombia
  - School of Canon Law
  - School of Theology
  - School of Philosophy
- School of Theology, Philosophy and Humanities, Pontifical Bolivarian University, Medellín, Colombia
- Faculty of Philosophy and Theology, Pontifical Catholic University of Ecuador, Quito, Ecuador
- Ecclesiastical Faculty of Sacred Theology, Universidad Católica "Nuestra Señora de la Asunción", Asuncion, Paraguay
- Facultad de Teología Pontificia y Civil de Lima, Lima, Peru
- Facultad de Teología Redemptoris Mater de El Callao Mater, Callao, Peru
- Facultad de Teología del Uruguay Mons. Mariano Soler, Montevideo, Uruguay

=== Asia ===
==== East Asia ====
- Sophia University, Tokyo, Japan
  - Faculty of Philosophy
  - Faculty of Theology
- Faculty of Theology, Nanzan University, Nagoya, Japan
- Fu Jen Faculty of Theology of St. Robert Bellarmine, Taipei, Taiwan

==== South Asia ====
- Dharmaram Vidya Kshetram, Bangalore, India
  - Faculty of Philosophy
  - Faculty of Theology
- Jnana Deepa, Institute of Philosophy and Theology, Pune, India
  - Faculty of Philosophy
  - Faculty of Theology
- Saint Peter's Pontifical Institute, Bangalore, India
  - Faculty of Theology
  - Institute of Philosophy
- Paurastya Vidyapitham Pontifical Oriental Institute of Religious Studies, Kottayam, India
- Sacred Heart College Satya Nilayam, Madras (Chennai), India
- Faculty of Theology, Saint Albert's College, Ranchi, India
- Faculty of Theology, Vidyajyoti Institute of Religious Studies, Delhi

==== South East Asia ====
- Fakultas Teologi Wedabhakti (Wedabhakti Pontifical Faculty of Theology), Yogyakarta, Indonesia
- Loyola School of Theology, Ateneo de Manila University, Manila, Philippines
- University of Santo Tomas, Manila, Philippines
  - Faculty of Canon Law
  - Faculty of Philosophy
  - Faculty of Theology
- Catholic Institute of Viet Nam

==== West Asia ====
- Ecole Biblique et Archéologique Française de Jérusalem, Jerusalem
- Pontifical School of Theology, Holy Spirit University of Kaslik, Kaslik, Lebanon

=== Europe ===
==== Austria ====
- Catholic Private University Linz, Linz, Austria
  - Faculty of Theology
  - Faculty of Philosophy and Art History
- Faculty of Catholic Theology, University of Innsbruck, Innsbruck, Austria
- ITI Catholic University, Schloss Trumau, Austria
- Faculty of Catholic Theology, Paris Lodron University of Salzburg, Salzburg, Austria
- Pontifical Philosophical Institute-Faculty of Catholic Theology, University of Graz, Graz, Austria
- Faculty of Catholic Theology, University of Vienna, Vienna, Austria
- Benedict XVI Philosophical-Theological University, Heiligenkreuz, Austria

==== Balkan - Southeast Europe ====
- Faculty of Catholic Theology, University of Sarajevo, Bosnia and Herzegovina
- University of Zagreb, Zagreb, Croatia
  - Faculty of Philosophy and Religious Sciences
  - Catholic Faculty of Theology
- Catholic Faculty of Theology, University of Split, Split, Croatia
- Catholic Faculty of Theology in Đakovo, University of Osijek, Croatia
- Faculty of Theology, University of Ljubljana, Slovenia

==== Central-East Europe ====
- Saints Cyril and Methodius Faculty of Theology, Palacký University Olomouc, Czech Republic
- Catholic Theological Faculty, Charles University, Prague, Czech Republic
- Faculty of Greek-Catholic Theology, University of Prešov, Slovakia
- Faculty of Roman Catholic Theology of Cyril and Methodius, Comenius University, Bratislava, Slovakia
- Faculty of Theology, Catholic University in Ružomberok, Slovakia
- Pázmány Péter Catholic University, Hungary
  - Faculty of Theology
  - Canon Law Institute
- Theology Faculty of Lviv, Ukraine
- Faculty of Catholic Theology, Vytautas Magnus University, Kaunas, Lithuania

==== France ====
- Catholic University of Paris
  - Faculty of Canon Law
  - Faculty of Philosophy
  - Faculty of Theology
  - Faculty of Social Sciences and Economics
- Catholic University of Toulouse
  - Faculty of Canon Law
  - Faculty of Philosophy
  - Faculty of Theology
- Centre Sèvres, Paris
  - Faculty of Philosophy
  - Faculty of Theology
- Catholic University of Lyon
  - Faculty of Philosophy
  - Faculty of Theology
- Faculty of Catholic Theology, University of Strasbourg
- Faculté de Théologie Notre Dame
- Faculty of Theology, Université catholique de Lille
- Faculty of Theology, Catholic University of the West

==== Germany ====
- Faculty of Catholic Theology, University of Augsburg
- Faculty of Catholic Theology, Rhenish Friedrich Wilhelm University of Bonn
- Faculty of Catholic Theology, Catholic University of Eichstätt-Ingolstadt
- Faculty of Catholic Theology, Johannes Gutenberg University Mainz
- LMU Munich
  - Faculty of Catholic Theology
  - Klaus-Mörsdorf-Studium für Kanonistik (Klaus-Mörsdorf-Studies for Canon Law)
- University of Münster
  - Faculty of Catholic Theology
  - Institut für Kanonisches Recht
- Faculty of Catholic Theology, University of Regensburg
- Faculty of Catholic Theology, Ruhr University Bochum
- Faculty of Catholic Theology, Julius Maximilian University of Würzburg
- Faculty of Roman-Catholic Theology, Eberhard Karl University of Tübingen
- Kölner Hochschule für Katholische Theologie
- Hochschule für Katholische Kirchenmusik und Musikpädagogik Regensburg (University of Catholic Church Music and Music Education Regensburg)
- Hochschule für Kirchenmusik der Diözese Rottenburg-Stuttgart (University of Church Music of the Diocese of Rottenburg-Stuttgart)
- Hochschule für Philosophie München (Munich School of Philosophy)
- Institut für Katholische Theologie (Institute for Catholic Theology), Philosophische Fakultät (Faculty of Arts and Humanities), RWTH Aachen University
- Philosophisch-Theologische Hochschule Münster
- Philosophisch-Theologische Hochschule Sankt Georgen
- Philosophisch-Theologische Hochschule Vallendar
- Faculty of Theology, Albert Ludwig University of Freiburg
- Theologische Fakultät Fulda
- Theologische Fakultät Paderborn
- Theologische Fakultät Trier

==== Italy ====
- Pontifical Lateran University, Rome
  - Faculty of Canon Law
  - Faculty of Civil Law
  - Faculty of Philosophy
  - Faculty of Theology
  - Pastoral Institute Redemptor Hominis
  - Institutum Utriusque Iuris
  - “Claretianum” Institute of Theology of Consecrated Life
  - “Augustinianum” Patristic Institute
  - Higher Institute of Moral Theology “Alphonsian Academy”
  - Peace Sciences
- Pontifical Athenaeum Regina Apostolorum, Rome
  - Faculty of Bioethics
  - Faculty of Philosophy
  - Faculty of Theology
- Pontifical University of the Holy Cross
  - School of Church Communications
  - School of Canon Law
  - School of Philosophy
  - Faculty of Theology
- Pontifical Oriental Institute, Rome
  - Faculty of Eastern Canon Law
  - Faculty of Eastern Christian Studies
- Pontifical University of Saint Anthony, Rome
  - Faculty of Canon Law
  - Faculty of Philosophy
  - Faculty of Biblical Sciences and Archaeology
  - Faculty of Theology
- Pontifical Gregorian University, Rome
  - Faculty of Canon Law
  - Faculty of Missiology
  - Faculty of Philosophy
  - Faculty of Social Sciences
  - Faculty of History and Cultural Heritage of the Church
  - Faculty of Theology
  - Institute of Psychology
  - Institute of Spirituality
- Pontifical University of Saint Thomas Aquinas, Rome
  - Faculty of Canon Law
  - Faculty of Philosophy
  - Faculty of Social Sciences
  - Faculty of Theology
- Pontifical Urban University, Rome
  - Faculty of Canon Law
  - Faculty of Missiology
  - Faculty of Philosophy
  - Faculty of Theology
- Pius X Faculty of Canon Law, Venice
- Pontifical Athenaeum of Saint Anselm, Rome
  - Faculty of Philosophy
  - Faculty of Theology
  - Pontificio Istituto Liturgico
- Salesian Pontifical University, Rome
  - Faculty of Christian and Classical Literature
  - Faculty of Sciences of Social Communication
  - Faculty of Sciences of Education
  - Faculty of Theology
- Pontifical Biblical Institute, Rome
  - Faculty of Sacred Scripture
  - Faculty of Ancient Near Eastern Studies
- Facoltà Teologica del Triveneto, Padua
- Facoltà Teologica dell'Emilia Romagna, Bologna
- Facoltà Teologica dell'Italia Centrale, Florence
- Facoltà Teologica dell'Italia Settentrionale, Milan
- Facoltà Teologica di Sicilia, Palermo
- Facoltà Teologica Pugliese, Bari
- Philosophisch-Theologische Hochschule Brixen
- Pontifical Faculty of Educational Sciences Auxilium
- Pontifical Faculty of Theology of Sardinia
- Marianum Pontifical Faculty of Theology, Rome
- Pontifical University of St. Bonaventure - Seraphicum, Rome
- Pontifical Theological Faculty and Pontifical Institute of Spirituality Teresianum
- Pontificio Istituto Ambrosiano di Musica Sacra, Milan
- Pontificio Istituto di Archeologia Cristiana, Rome
- Pontificio Istituto di Musica Sacra, Rome
- Pontificio Istituto di Studi Arabi e d'Islamistica, Rome
- John Paul II Pontifical Theological Institute for Marriage and Family Sciences
- Pontificia Facoltà Teologica dell'Italia Meridionale
  - Sezione S.Luigi Posillipo
  - Sezione S.Tommaso d'Aquino Capodimonte

==== Northwest Europe ====
- Faculty of Theology, Université catholique de Louvain (UCLouvain), Belgium
- Katholieke Universiteit Leuven (KU Leuven), Belgium
  - Faculty of Theology and Religious Studies
  - Faculty of Canon Law
  - Institute of Philosophy
- Tilburg School of Catholic Theology, Tilburg University, Netherland
- Mater Ecclesiae College, London, United Kingdom
- St Patrick's Pontifical University, Maynooth, Ireland

==== Poland ====
- Cardinal Stefan Wyszyński University, Warsaw (formerly Academy of Catholic Theology)
  - Faculty of Catholic Theology
  - Faculty of Christian Philosophy
  - Faculty of Family Studies
  - Faculty of Theology
- Faculty of Theology, Adam Mickiewicz University in Poznań
- Faculty of Theology, University of Szczecin
- Pontifical Faculty of Theology of Wroclaw
- Faculty of Philosophy, Jesuit University of Philosophy and Education Ignatianum
- Pontifical University of John Paul II
  - Faculty of History and Cultural Heritage
  - Faculty of Social Sciences
  - Faculty of Canon Law
  - Faculty of Philosophy
  - Faculty of Theology
- John Paul II Catholic University of Lublin
  - Faculty of Philosophy
  - Faculty of Law, Canon Law and Administration
  - Faculty of Theology
  - Faculty of Theology, Section in Tarnów
- Faculty of Theology, Nicolaus Copernicus University in Toruń
- Faculty of Theology, University of Opole
- Faculty of Theology, University of Silesia in Katowice
- Faculty of Theology, University of Szczecin
- Faculty of Theology, University of Warmia and Mazury in Olsztyn

==== Southwest Europe Iberia Mediterranean ====
- Catholic University of Portugal
  - Faculty of Theology
  - Higher Institute of Canon Law
- San Damaso Ecclesiastical University, Madrid, Spain
  - Faculty of Canon Law
  - Faculty of Philosophy
  - Faculty of Christian and Classical Literature St. Justin
  - Faculty of Theology
- Valencia Catholic University Saint Vincent Martyr, Valencia, Spain
  - Faculty of Canon Law
  - Faculty of Theology
- University of Navarra, Spain
  - Faculty of Canon Law
  - Faculty of Philosophy
  - Faculty of Theology
- Comillas Pontifical University, Madrid, Spain
  - Faculty of Canon Law
  - Faculty of Philosophy attached to the Faculty of Humanities and Social Sciences
  - Faculty of Theology
- Pontifical University of Salamanca, Spain
  - Faculty of Canon Law
  - Faculty of Philosophy
- Ateneu Universitari Sant Pacià, Barcelona, Spain
  - Faculty of History, Archeology and Christian Art Antonio Gaudì
  - Faculty of Theology of Catalonia
  - Ecclesiastical Faculty of Philosophy of Catalonia
  - Institut Superior de Litúrgia ad instar Facultatis
- Faculty of Theology, Loyola University Andalusia, Spain
- Facultad de Teología de San Esteban, Spain
- Facultad de Teología San Isidoro de Sevilla, Spain
- Facultad Teológica del Norte de España, Spain
  - Sede de Burgos
  - Sede de Vitoria
- Faculty of Theology, University of Deusto, Spain
- Faculty of Theology, University of Malta

==== Switzerland ====
- Facoltà di Teologia di Lugano
- Faculty of Theology, University of Fribourg
- Faculty of Theology, University of Lucerne
- Theologische Hochschule Chur

=== Oceania ===
- Catholic Institute of Sydney, Sydney, Australia
