= Bachelor of Divinity =

Academic degree in divinity, theology or religious studies

In Western universities, a Bachelor of Divinity or Baccalaureate in Divinity (BD, DB, or BDiv; Latin: Baccalaureus Divinitatis) is an academic degree awarded in divinity or related disciplines, such as theology or religious studies. It may be a postgraduate degree, as at the University of Cambridge and Trinity College Dublin, or an undergraduate degree, as in the Scottish universities and at St Patrick's Pontifical University, Maynooth. It was previously offered in the US, where it has been largely replaced by the Master of Divinity.

== United Kingdom ==
=== Undergraduate ===
Institutions that offer an undergraduate BD degree in the United Kingdom as of June 2026 are the universities of Aberdeen, Edinburgh, Glasgow and St Andrews.

At the University of London, Heythrop College offered an undergraduate BD course through the University of London International Programmes (lately, University of London Worldwide), which was not restricted to only members of the university. Following the closure of Heythrop College in January 2019, the University of London itself provided academic direction for the Divinity programme, drawing tutors from former academics that were at Heythrop College, academics from the theology department of King's College London, and outsourced academics on an ad hoc basis. From 2021, the London BD was a standard undergraduate degree in religious studies, unlike the more theologically Christian-orientated BDs at other universities, with options for specialising in Christian theology or religious studies in general depending on module selection. The London BD was withdrawn in Autumn 2025, with those registered in Sept 2025 being the final cohort due to graduate in 2032 at the latest.

The Presbyterian Union Theological College previously awarded the Bachelor of Divinity as an undergraduate qualification as part of Queen's University, Belfast.

=== Postgraduate ===
At the University of Cambridge, and previously at the universities of Oxford and the Durham, the BD is a postgraduate qualification. Registration for Cambridge's BD is only open to graduates of that university of five years standing or to graduates of other universities of five years standing who have been admitted to the Cambridge MA. The BD at Cambridge is the highest ranking bachelor's degree and outranks the PhD. It requires a significant contribution to knowledge in the area of Christian theology, and is awarded based on published work, dissertation, or a combination of both. At Oxford, a candidate for the degree had to be have a Master of Arts of that university; the degree was closed to new registrations in 2005. At Durham, the BD was available to graduates of any university of three years' standing and was awarded on the basis of published work of a similar extent to a PhD. According to the university archives, it was awarded ad eundem (to BDs from Oxford, Cambridge or Dublin) from 1838 to 1895 and by examination from 1850 to 1979, although it was not formally withdrawn until later.

== Ireland ==
In Ireland, St Patrick's Pontifical University, Maynooth, offers the Baccalaureate in Divinity as an undergraduate degree. This is a Roman Catholic ecclesiastical degree equivalent to the Bachelor of Sacred Theology.

Trinity College Dublin offers a Bachelor in Divinity (BD) as a part-time postgraduate degree at level 9 on the Irish National Framework of Qualification (master's degrees). It is awarded based on the completion of eight examination papers and a 40,000 word thesis within five years.

== India ==
In India, the seminaries affiliated to the Senate of Serampore College (University) offer a Bachelor of Divinity as a postgraduate degree. Those with a Bachelor of Theology degree are allowed to have a lateral entry into Bachelor of Divinity courses. It is mandatory to have a BD degree or its equivalent to enter into Master of Theology program at seminaries affiliated to the Senate of Serampore College (University).

== Other countries ==
in New Zealand, the undergraduate degree in theology is the Bachelor of Theology. Until recently both were offered at the University of Otago. The BD was the older, postgraduate degree and was usually attained by people training for ministry in the Presbyterian Church. The BD is no longer offered by the University of Otago.

At Moore Theological College in Sydney, Australia, the BD is classified as a post-graduate bachelor's degree in the sense that the normal entry requirement is completion of another bachelor's degree. The BD consists of four years of coursework in theology with an emphasis on biblical studies including original languages. The degree may be awarded with honours depending on grades and successful completion of a research component. The BD is the basic qualification for ordination in the Anglican Diocese of Sydney. Similar courses of study (often only three years in duration) at comparable institutions in Australia have been reclassified as a Master's in Divinity.

In American seminaries, a three-year postgraduate Bachelor of Divinity was the standard first professional degree for those training for ministry until the 1970s. The degree was renamed the Master of Divinity following a recommendation from the American Association of Theological Schools in 1970 and to reflect standard nomenclature for degrees that required a previous undergraduate degree.

== See also ==
- Master of Arts (Theology and Religion)
- Master of Divinity
- Master of Theology
- Doctor of Theology
- Doctor of Divinity
