= S'Archittu =

- Frazione
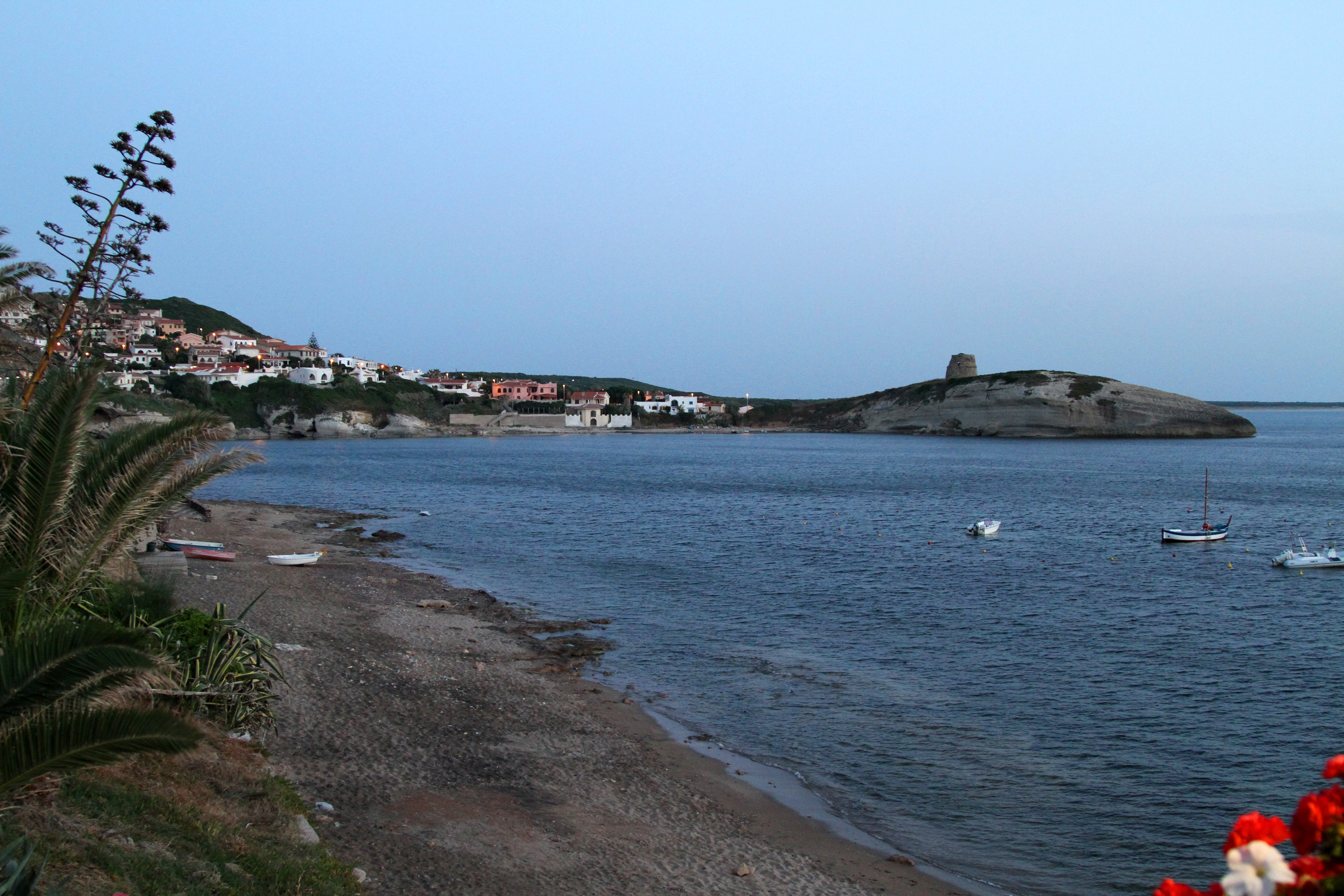
- A Panorama of S'Archittu

- Location of S'Archittu in Italy
- Coordinates: 40°05′21.80″N 08°29′42.60″E
- Country: Italy
- Region: Sardinia
- Province: Oristano (OR)
- Comune: Cuglieri
- Elevation: 10 m (33 ft)

Population
  - Total: 105
- Demonym: S'Archittesi
- Time zone: UTC+1 (CET)
  - Summer (DST): UTC+2 (CEST)
- Postal code: 09073
- Dialing code: (+39) 0785

S'Archittu (Translation: "the little arch," in the Sardinian language) is a small coastal tourist resort near Oristano (Sardinia, Italy), part of the municipality of Cuglieri.

== Toponym ==
The locality takes its name from the rock arch (S'Archittu) which encloses the beach, easily reachable by walk via a footway; during summer nights the arch is illuminated. The top of the arch is used for sea diving and it was the location of one event in the 2001 High Dive World Championship. The arch, about 17 metres high, is a result of marine erosion of an ancient cave formed in the limestone.

== Nearby ==
Approximately 1 km to the south of S'Archittu is Torre del Pozzo ("The Well's Tower).
