= Michael Kwanashie =

Nigerian economist

MSSSN Michael Kanashie

Vice-chancellor, Veritas University
- In office 2012–2018
- Succeeded by: Ichoku Hyacinth

Personal details
- Education: Ahmadu Bello University, Northwestern University, Evanston, USA, McGill University, Montreal, Canada
- Occupation: lecturer, researcher
- Profession: Economics

Michael Kanashie is a Nigerian academic who serves as Professor of Economics at Ahmadu Bello University. He served as the Vice Chancellor of Veritas University from 2012 to 2018.

== Education ==
Kwanashie obtained his B.Sc. degree in Economics from Ahmadu Bello University, Zaria in the year 1974 after which he sought for and obtained a MA in Economics at Northwestern University, Evanston, USA in the year 1977. In the same year, he procured the Certificate of African Studies (Postgraduate) also in the same school, and then attained PhD in Economics, McGill University, Montreal, Canada (1981).

== Teaching and research ==
Kwanashie's university career started with an appointment in the Department of Economics as Graduate Assistant, in A.B.U. Zaria in the year 1975 after which he then progressed to the rank of Professor of Economics in the year 1992 which was in the same department and he has continued to date.He was a member of the Research Team of the Nigerian Institute for Social and Economic Research (NISER)which were on the project “NISER Econometric Model of the Nigerian Economy” in the year 1985. He was also a Member of the Economy Watch project, NISER (1986–1990).

During the years 1989 to 1990, he was on secondment to the Federal Ministry of Industry as Training Coordinator of the Policy Analysis Department (PAD), NISER, Ibadan. He became the National Project Coordinator of the United Nations Development Programme (UNDP) and the United Nations Industrial Development Organisation (UNIDO), to also mention the Industrial Technical Assistance Project (ITAP) of the Federal Ministry of Industry [(UNDP/UNIDO Consultant), 1990-1992.

During the years 1996 to 1998, he was the National Programme Management Adviser of the United Nations Development Programme (UNDP)which assisted Small and Medium Enterprises (SME) Development Programme of the Federal Ministry of Industry. He is a Member of research teams of the Institute for Development Research Ahmadu Bello University, Zaria. He became a consultant to ABUCONS Ahmadu Bello University on “Study on the Evaluation of the Revenue Powers and Responsibilities of the Three Tiers of Government in Nigeria” which was conducted for the Revenue Mobilization, Allocation and Fiscal Commission Abuja in the year 1997. in 2000, he became the Lead Consultant to ABUCONS Ahmadu Bello University on Study on "Fiscal Responsibility and Revenue Allocation in Nigeria” which was conducted for the Revenue Mobilization, Allocation and Fiscal Commission in Abuja. In 2001, he was the Chairman, Technical Committee on the National Trade Policy. Federal Ministry of Commerce Abuja 2001.

After those were more memberships in various teams until he became a member of the Technical Review Team on the 2008 Federal Budget Proposal and Resource Person at the PARP Workshop which was for members of the National Assembly. He was a member of the Technical Review Team on the 2009 Federal Budget Proposal and Resource Person at the PARP Workshop for members of the National Assembly.

He is currently in Chair of the Technical Committee of the Expanded Focal Group on Trade Matters, Federal Ministry of Commerce and Industry Abuja.

He is a member of the Macroeconomic Work Group of the Vision 20-2020 National Planning Commission 2009. He is a member of the committee on the preparation of Nigeria Vision 20:2020 1st Implementation Plan (2010–2013).

== Administrative experience ==
Kwanashie was the Head of Department, Department of Economics ABU Zaria in 1987-1990. He was the Sub-Dean (Academics) for the Faculty of Arts and Social Sciences ABU Zaria 1983 to 1984.

He was the Training Coordinator, Policy Analysis Department of the Federal Ministry of Industry, Ibadan during the years 1990 to 1992. He then became the Foundation Director, Institute for Development Research, Ahmadu Bello University, Zaria in 1998 to 2003. During the years 2002 to 2003, he was the Director of the Independent Policy Group (IPG) Policy Think Tank of the President of the Federal Republic of Nigeria. He is the Special Adviser (Economic and Social Affairs) to the President of the Federal Republic of Nigeria in the Office of the Vice-President Federal Republic of Nigeria.

== Honours ==
He has two honours to his name, the first was the Afgrad Fellow African American Institute 1975 and 1976 and the second; Fellow of the Nigerian Economic Society (FNES) 2007.
