= Catholic Institute of West Africa =

Religious institute in Nigeria

- Motto: Latin: Semper agens, semper quietus
- Motto in English: Always busy, Always at rest
- Type: Ecclesiastical institute
- Established: 1981
- Affiliations: UNICAL
- Religious affiliation: Roman Catholic
- Rector: Sylvanus I. Udoidem
- Location: Rumuibekwe, Port Harcourt, Rivers State, Nigeria; 4°50′39″N 7°2′38″E
- Campus: Urban
- Website: welcome.ciwaedu.ng

The Catholic Institute of West Africa (CIWA) is a tertiary educational institution in Port Harcourt, Rivers State, Nigeria. It is a higher ecclesiastical institute of the Catholic Church and remains the leading theological facility in West Africa.

== History ==
Established in 1981, the institute started with 8 students, 8 academic and administrative staff with Monsignor Stephen Ezeanya (later the Archbishop of Onitsha) as the first rector. In 1982, the institute relocated to its present site at 2nd Artillery, Rumuibekwe. The institution's proprietor is the Regional Episcopal Conference of West Africa (RECOWA).

According to the institution's website, the Catholic Institute of West Africa has "assisted thousands of students in discovering and nurturing their call to Christian service, gaining a deeper understanding of Christianity and religion, and its role in a changing world." In September 2014, CIWA regained possession of its campus at Obehie in Abia State. The campus had been temporarily used by Veritas University prior to its permanent relocation that year.

== Administrative structure ==
At the administrative level, the institute consists of the following members:

- Rector: Very Rev. Prof. Jude Abidemi Asanbe
- Registrar: Rev. Fr. Dr. Wilson U. Akhigbe
- Bursar: Mr. Ambrose Agugua
- Librarians: Grace O. Nnodim

== Academics ==
=== Departments ===
Several academic departments offer a range of courses at different levels from certificate to Licenciate and PhD. These departments include:

- Biblical Studies
- Systematic Theology
- Center for Studies of African Culture and Communications (CESACC)
- Sacred Liturgy
- Canon Law
- Pastoral/Spirituality
- Moral Theology

=== Libraries ===
The institute has well-equipped libraries at both Port Harcourt and Obehie campuses. The CIWA Main Library in Port Harcourt is managed by a committee, two professional librarians and three assistants. There's internet access to aid research as well as other studies. Contents of the library are updated regularly to keep up with theological trends and developments.
