= Torre del Pozzo =

- Frazione
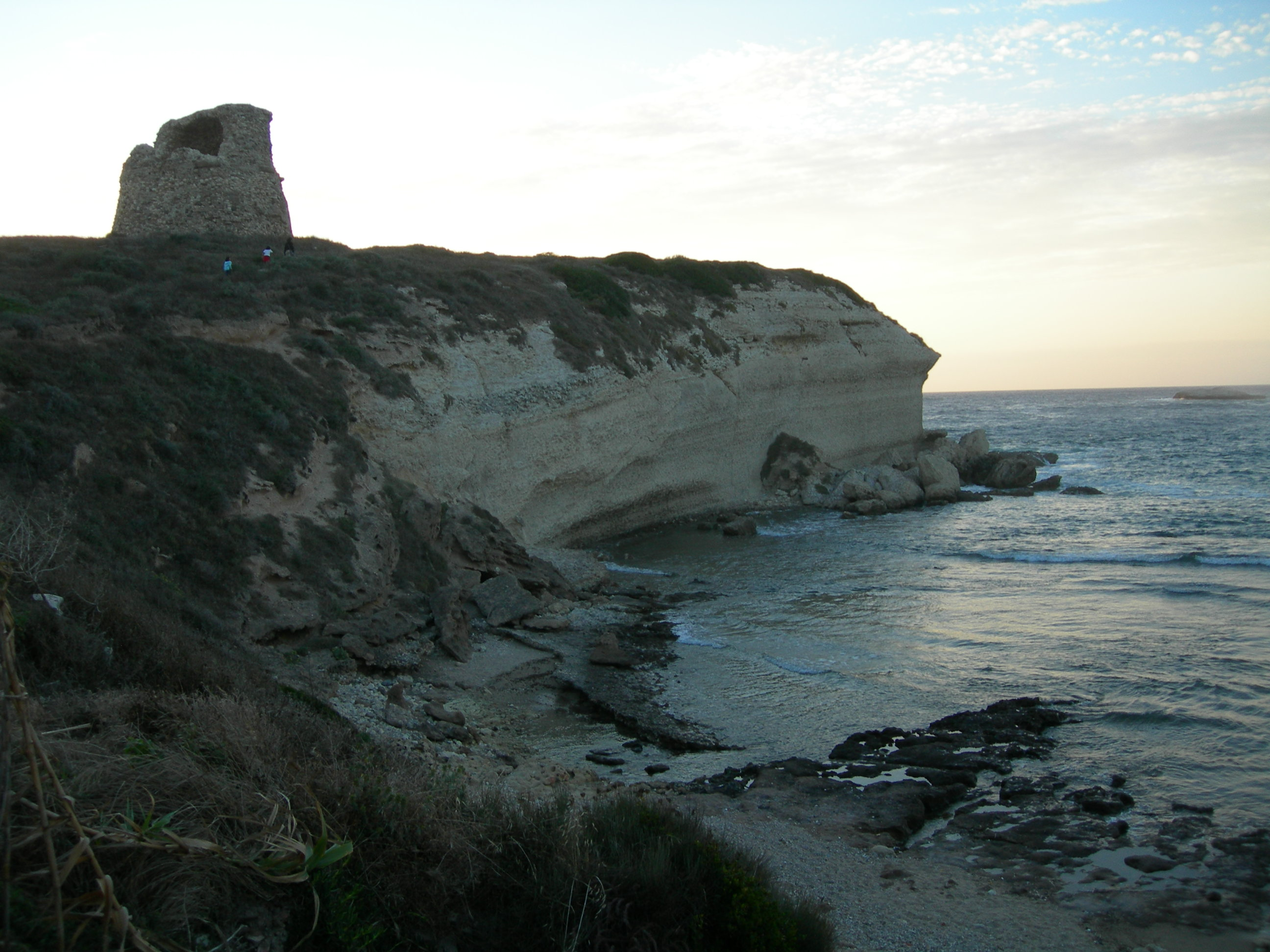
- View of the watch tower from the beach

- Location of Torre del Pozzo in Italy
- Coordinates: 40°05′06.72″N 08°29′31.00″E
- Country: Italy
- Region: Sardinia
- Province: Oristano (OR)
- Comune: Cuglieri
- Elevation: 12 m (39 ft)
- Time zone: UTC+1 (CET)
  - Summer (DST): UTC+2 (CEST)

Torre del Pozzo is a small coastal village in Sardinia within the municipal territory of Cuglieri.

It includes the 7 km long Arenas beach and is flanked by a large marine pine forest.

The tower on the headland once served as a watch tower to safe-guard the island from invaders from the sea.

There is also a natural vertical tunnel not far from the tower, S'Archittu, eroded through the limestone and sandstone by the sea. It gushes sea water when the Mistral blows from the north-west.
