= Pontifical Faculty of Theology of Sardinia =

Theological institution in Cagliari, Italy

The Pontifical Faculty of Theology of Sardinia is a theological academic institution founded by pope Pius XI in Cuglieri (Sardinia – Italy) with the Apostolic Constitution Nostrarum Partem of 5 August 1927. It was the first Italian Faculty of Theology extra urbem (outside Rome).

== History ==
On 14 May 1612, Claudio Acquaviva, Superior General of the Society of Jesus, raised the college of Sassari to the status of a University of Ecclesiastic Law in order to confer the academic grades in Philosophy and Theology. Five years later, in 1617, by decree of King Philip III of Spain, it became a University by royal law with the same two faculties.

On 12 February 1607, Pope Paul V promoted the college of Cagliari to University. The promotion was later confirmed by Philip III in 1620, but the courses could start only in 1626. By that time, Cagliari already had all the Faculties expected by the University regulations of that epoch. Under Philip IV of Spain, Sassari completed its Faculties in 1632 and obtained a few years later the pontifical recognition for the Faculty of Canon Law. The Society of Jesus had an active participation in both Sardinian Universities until its dissolution in 1773.

In 1873, the Faculties of Theology within the Universities of the Kingdom of Italy were suppressed. With the Papal Brief Innumera splendidaque by 1 December 1876, Pope Pius IX founded the theological colleges within the seminaries of Cagliari and Sassari, authorizing them to release the academic grades of Baccalaureate, Licence and Doctorate.

With the Apostolic Constitution Nostrarum partem of 5 August 1927, Pope Pius XI founded in Cuglieri – along with the Pontifical Major Seminary accorded to the Society of Jesus – the two Faculties of Theology and Philosophy which were supposed to extend the activity already started in the Universities of Cagliari and Sassari. A few years later, due to a lack of funds, the Faculty of Philosophy was suppressed while only the Faculty of Theology was kept.

After the renewal promoted by Second Vatican Council, which required the Ecclesiastic Faculties to revise their regulations, the Faculty of Theology of Sardinia undertook the reworking of its charters. Once a temporary approval was obtained by the Congregation for Catholic Education, on 2 February 1974, the charters were conformed to the mandate of the Apostolic Constitution Sapientia christiana, promulgated by John Paul II on 15 April 1979, to be definitively approved on 25 March 1987.

In the academic year 1971-1972, the Faculty of Theology was moved to Cagliari, where it still has its registered office. In the academic year 1972-1973, the Congregation for Catholic Education entrusted the Sardinian Episcopal Conference with the running of the Faculty. On that occasion, a six-year agreement, renewable and still effective, was signed with the Society of Jesus, through which the Society of Jesus was put in charge of the academic direction of the Faculty.

On 12 March 1999, the Faculty of Theology was enrolled in the Register for Legal Personalities within the Law Court of Cagliari. The Pontifical Faculty of Theology of Sardinia made an agreement with the University of Cagliari according to which the students of both institutions can freely attend courses and take exams at the two Universities.

== Faculty ==
The Faculty of Theology of Sardinia academically depends upon the Congregation for Catholic Education of the Holy See.

It is structured into four Departments: Philosophy and Human Sciences, Biblical and Patristic Sciences, Systematics and Liturgy, Practical Theology.

The Faculty confers the degrees of Baccalaureate (a 3-year-BA degree), Licence (a 2-year-MA degree), and Doctorate (a 3-year-PhD degree). The Licence degree, which has the specialization in "Systematic Theology – Christian Thought and Inculturation", focuses on the relationship between the doctrine (systematic and biblical courses) and its reception in time (historical courses) and in space (practical/pastoral courses).

The Faculty is frequented both by clerics and laics (by now in a ratio of 50%), thanks also to an agreement of cooperation with the University of Cagliari.

The library has more than 150,000 volumes and 250 current journals, and it is specialized in Theology, Biblical Sciences, Canon Law, Philosophy, Patristic, Christian Archaeology, History of Christianity and Church, Liturgy, Spirituality and Bioethics.

The Faculty publishes the annual journal Theologica & Historica and a number of academic book series such as Studi e Ricerche di Cultura Religiosa, Limine (Dept. of Philosophy and Human Sciences) and Handbooks. Collana di strumenti e materiali a supporto dei corsi universitari (Dept. of Biblical and Patristic Sciences).

== Bibliography ==
- R. Turtas, La nascita dell'università in Sardegna, Sassari 1988.
- T. Cabizzosu, "Alcuni aspetti dell'insegnamento teologico a Cuglieri dal 1927 alla vigilia del Vaticano II", in T. Cabizzosu - L. Armando (editori), Iuventuti docendae ac educandae. Per gli ottant'anni della Facoltà Teologica della Sardegna, Cagliari 2007, 19-55.
- M. Spano, "La Facoltà di Filosofia presso la Pontificia Facoltà Teologica del Sacro Cuore (1927-1932)", in T. Cabizzosu - L. Armando (editori), Iuventuti docendae ac educandae cit., 401-419.
