= Valencia Catholic University Saint Vincent Martyr =

University in Valencia, Spain

Valencia Catholic University
- Universidad Católica de Valencia
- Motto: Ante todo personas
- Established: 2003
- Affiliations: Catholic
- Chancellor: Antonio Cañizares Llovera
- Vice-Chancellor: Esteban Escudero Torres
- Rector: Asunción Gandía Balaguer
- Academic staff: 463
- Students: 13.286
- Location: Valencia, Province of Valencia, Spain; 39°28′13″N 0°22′48″W
- Mascot: Sento
- Website: ucv.es

Valencia Catholic University Saint Vincent Martyr (in Spanish language Universidad Católica de Valencia San Vicente Mártir) is a private, catholic university, located in Valencia, Spain. It has campuses in Valencia, Godella, Burjassot, Torrent, Alzira and Xàtiva.

The university offers 26 undergraduate degrees and 58 master's, with 24 research institutes and 28 local volunteer programs and two abroad.

== History ==
It is named after Saint Vincent of Saragossa and it was established on the feast of the Immaculate Conception, December 8, 2003. It consists of six faculties, education and sports sciences, psychology and health sciences, sociology and human sciences, experimental sciences, business studies and medicine.

It is a continuation of the university work performed for over thirty years by the Edetania Foundation. Monsignor José María García Lahiguera, archbishop of Valencia, with the cooperation of some religious institutions, created the School of Teacher Education Edetania on November 3, 1969 and it acquired the name Edetania Foundation in January 1974. A few years later, in 1979, the then Archbishop of Valencia Monsignor Miguel Roca Canabellas and the rector of University of Valencia signed the agreement Edetania secondment to the University of Valencia.

== Campus ==
=== Valencia Campus ===
The Valencia Campus is situated in the historical center of Valencia, and was built in 1760. This building, which hosts the Valencian Academy of Surgery, is located next to Valencian Museum of Enlightenment and Modernity (MUVIM). It also hosts the rectorate office and the central services of the university.

=== Santa Úrsula ===
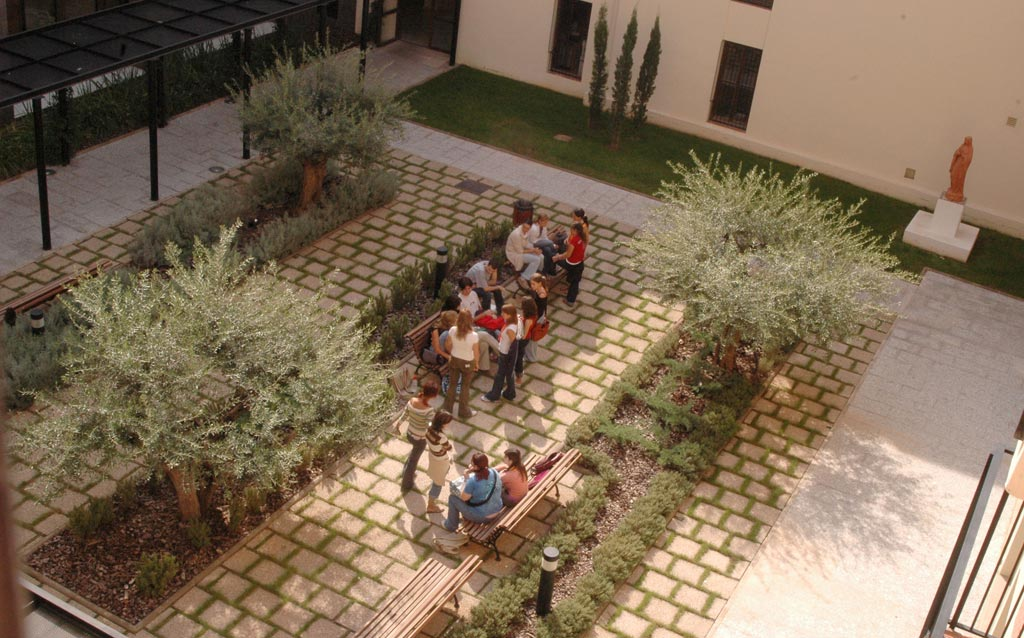
Courtyard of Santa Úrsula

It is located in the former convent of St. Ursula, founded by the Archbishop of Valencia San Juan dde Rebeira in 1605, which was declared a cultural interest of Torres de Quart. The monastery has been renovated and expanded. It has a floor area of 5000 sq m and is equipped with modern technology to facilitate the proper use of academic and university activities. In this place are library, laboratories, photography room, MAC room, auditorium, teacher's offices and cafeteria, as well a garden patio.

=== San Juan Bautista ===
Located in a classic building next to Turia Gardens and close to the bus station of Valencia. This campus has facilities for teaching and complementary activities. A language laboratory, computer lab, complete library and comfortable gardens are inside the building.

=== San Juan and San Vicente ===
Located in an annex building of the parish of San Juan and San Vicente, it has six floors, with a ground floor and a basement, this is 2,560 sq m and has the capacity to accommodate up to 1,200 students.

=== Virgin of the Helpless (Virgen de los Desamparados) ===
Located in a building with more than 50 years of history and near the hospital, library and MUVIM.

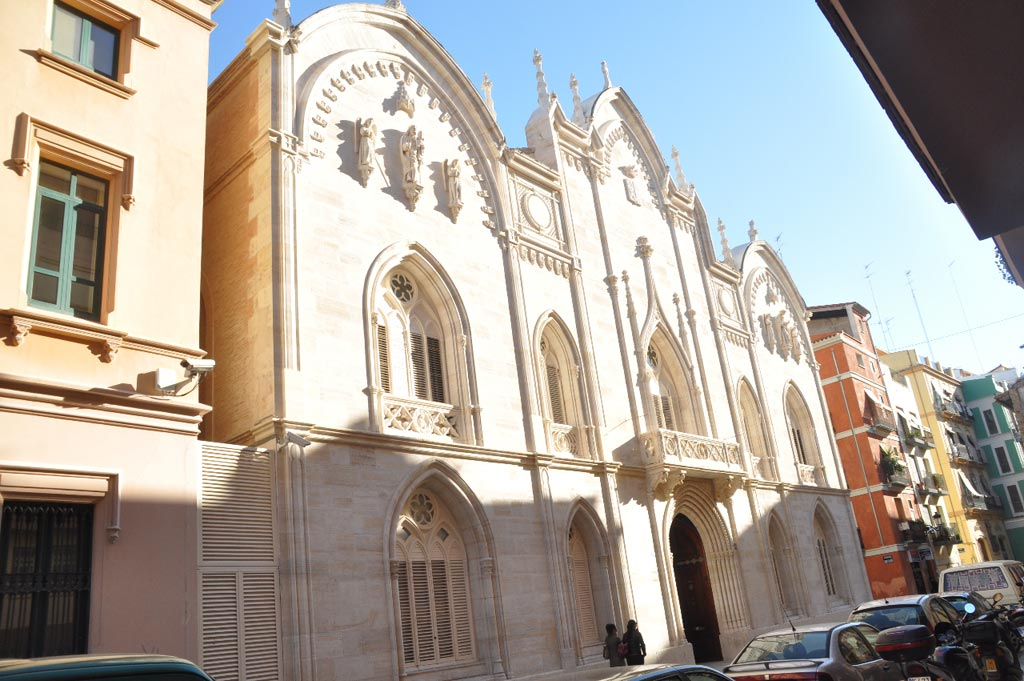
Marqués de Campo

=== Maqués de Campo ===
Near Sana Ursula and (Torres de Quart), is next to the Cultural center La Beneficiencia de de Valencia and the Valencian Institute of Modern Art (IVAM). It has an inner courtyard garden, computer rooms and MAC classroom. Here are taught:

- Degree in Business Administration and Management (ADE)
- Degree in Economics (distance)
- Degree in Economic and Financial Management (GECOFIN)
- Degree in Multimedia and Digital Arts (MAD)

== Scholarships ==
The university allocates €5.4 million to scholarships. The money is destined to different aid programs, ranging from full scholarship coverage to a percentage of the scholarship coverage. The university helps students who are part of a large families.
