= Cuglieri =

Cuglieri Cùllieri
- Comune
- Comune di Cuglieri
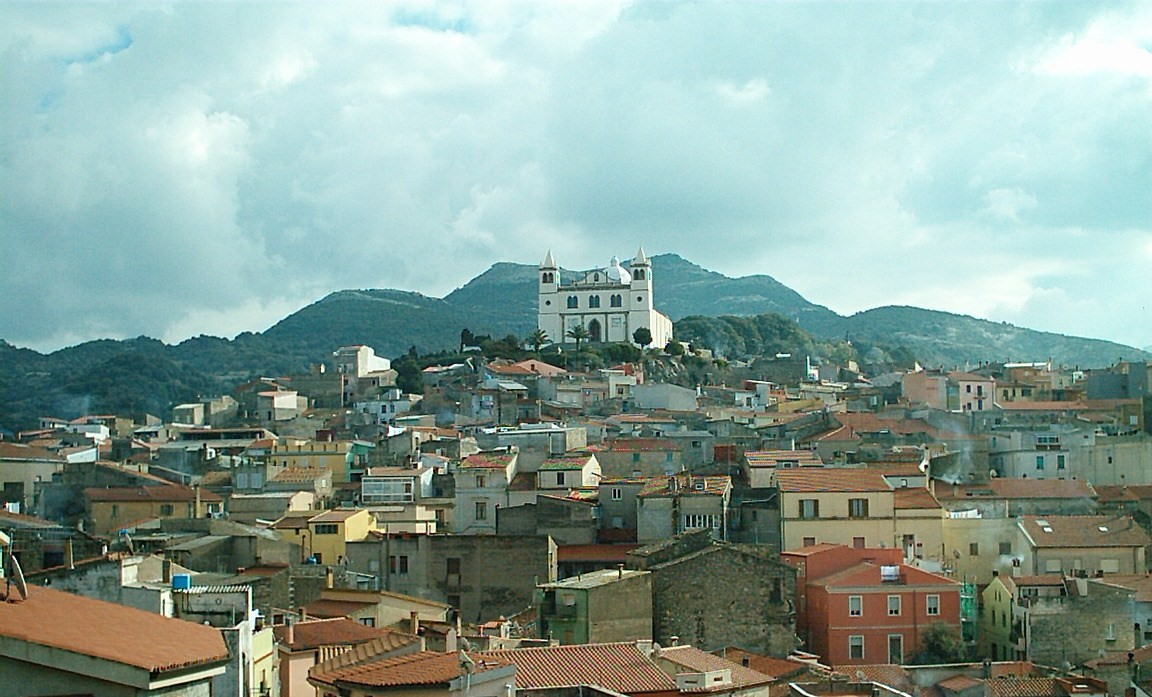

- Coat of arms

- Location within Sardinia
- Coordinates: 40°11′N 8°34′E
- Country: Italy
- Region: Sardinia
- Province: Oristano (OR)
- Frazioni: Santa Caterina di Pittinuri, S'Archittu, Torre del Pozzo

Government
  - Mayor: Andrea Loche

Area
  - Total: 120.5 km^{2} (46.5 sq mi)
- Elevation: 479 m (1,572 ft)

Population (Dec. 2004)
  - Total: 3,015
  - Density: 25.02/km^{2} (64.80/sq mi)
- Demonym(s): Cuglieritani; Cullieridanos
- Time zone: UTC+1 (CET)
  - Summer (DST): UTC+2 (CEST)
- Postal code: 09073
- Dialing code: 0785

Cuglieri (Sardinian: Cùllieri) is a comune (municipality) in the Province of Oristano in the Italian region Sardinia, located about 120 kilometres (75 mi) northwest of Cagliari and about 42 kilometres (26 mi) north of Oristano.

== See also ==
- S'Archittu
