= Veritas University =

Private university located in Abuja, Nigeria

- Other name: The Catholic University of Nigeria
- Motto: Seeking the Truth
- Type: Private
- Established: 2007; 19 years ago
- Founder: Catholic Church in Nigeria
- Vice-Chancellor: Prof. Ichoku Hyacinth
- Location: Bwari Area Council, FCT-Abuja, Abuja, Nigeria; 9.29070°N 7.41642°E
- Campus: Rural 49 acres (20 ha)
- Colours: Green; White; Blue
- Website: veritas.edu.ng
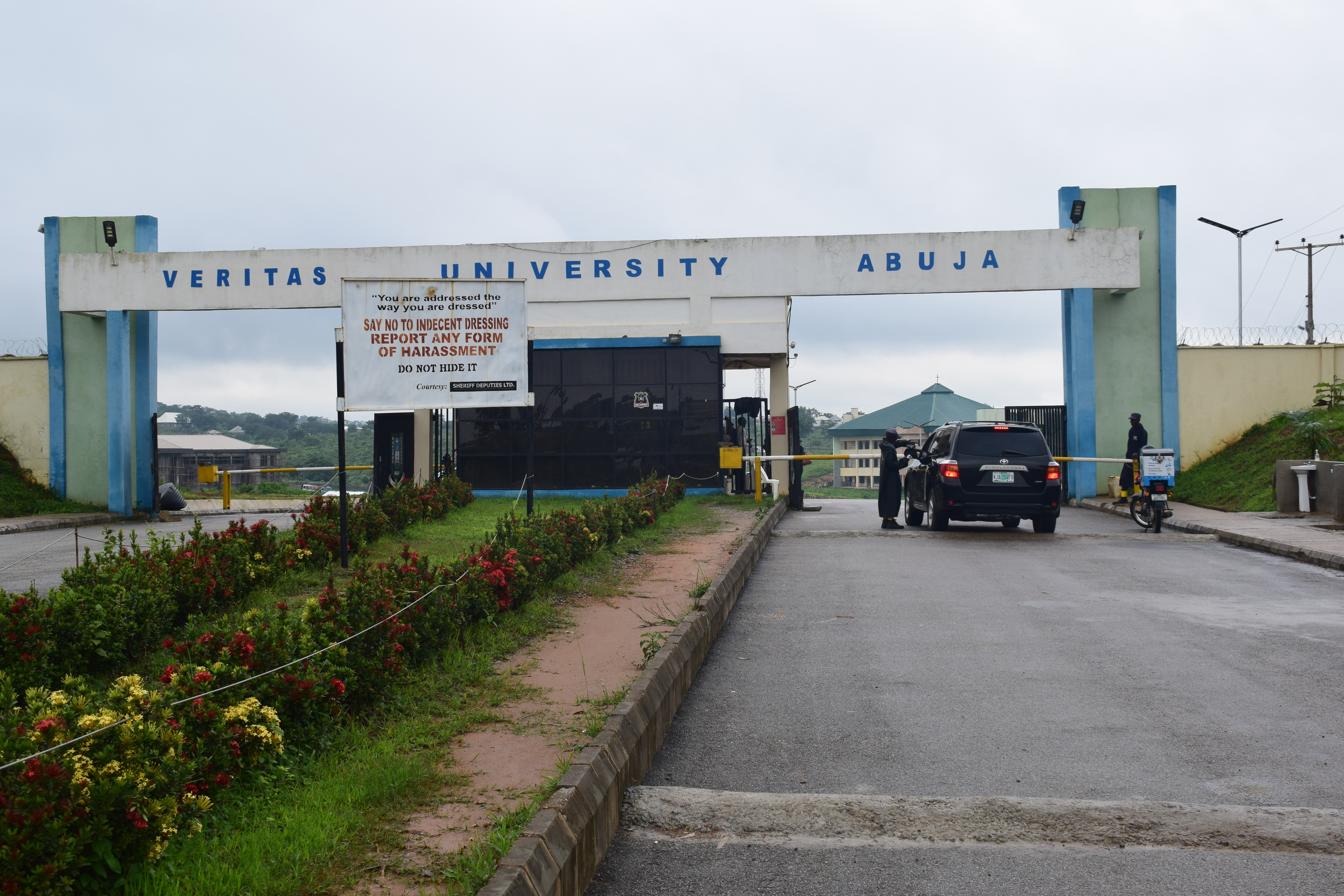

Veritas University is a private university located in Abuja. It was founded in March 2002 by the Catholic Church in Nigeria. The Institution received its provisional operation licence in 2007 from the National Universities Commission and commenced admission of students in October 2008, at its take-off campus in Obehie, Abia State, Nigeria.

They succeeded in winning tech and debate. Winning the 3rd African Telecommunication Union (ATU) Africa Innovation Challenge ($20,000 prize) for its Software Engineering Lab's initiatives.

== History ==
Veritas University Abuja (VUNA), also known as the Catholic University of Nigeria, was founded by the Catholic Bishops Conference of Nigeria through a resolution given at its March 2002 meeting in Abuja. The initiative was born by the collective desire of the attending Bishops for a University that would provide high-quality tertiary education according to the tradition of the Catholic Church.

The Institution received its provisional operation licence in 2007 from the National Universities Commission and commenced admission of students in October 2008 at its take-off campus in Obehie, Abia State, Nigeria. In 2014, it moved to its permanent site with its campus now located in the Bwari Area Council of the Federal Capital Territory, Abuja, Nigeria.

The University emphasizes moral values, self-reliance and the development of the students' entrepreneurial capabilities for the social and economic benefit of the graduates and the Nigerian society.

== Academics ==
The University currently offers undergraduate and postgraduate programs across five faculties:

=== Natural and Applied Sciences ===
- B.Sc. Applied Chemistry
- B.Sc. Physics with Electronics
- B.Sc. Biochemistry
- B.Sc. Microbiology
- B.Sc. Computer science
- B.Sc. Software Engineering

=== Management Sciences ===
- B.Sc. Accounting
- B.Sc. Banking and Finance
- B.Sc. Business Administration
- B.Sc. Entrepreneurship
- B.Sc. Public Administration
- B.Sc. Marketing

=== Humanities ===
- B.A. English and Literary Studies
- B.A. History and International Relations
- B.A. Philosophy
- B.A. Religion and Intercultural Studies
- B.A. Theology

=== Social Sciences ===
- B.Sc. Economics
- B.Sc. Mass Communication
- B.Sc. Political Science and Diplomacy
- B.Sc. Peace and conflict studies

=== Education ===
- B.Ed. Science Education
- B.Ed. Educational Management
- B.Ed. Arts and Social Science
- B.Ed. Guidance and Counseling
- B.Ed. English Education
- B.Sc. Ed. Economics Education
- B.Sc. Ed. Physics Education
- B.Sc. Ed. Chemistry Education

=== Engineering ===
- B.Eng. Computer engineering
- B.Eng. Electronic engineering

=== Law ===
- LL.B. Law

=== Postgraduate Studies ===
- Post-graduate Diploma (PGD)
- Masters of Art (M.A.)
- Master of Science (M.Sc.)

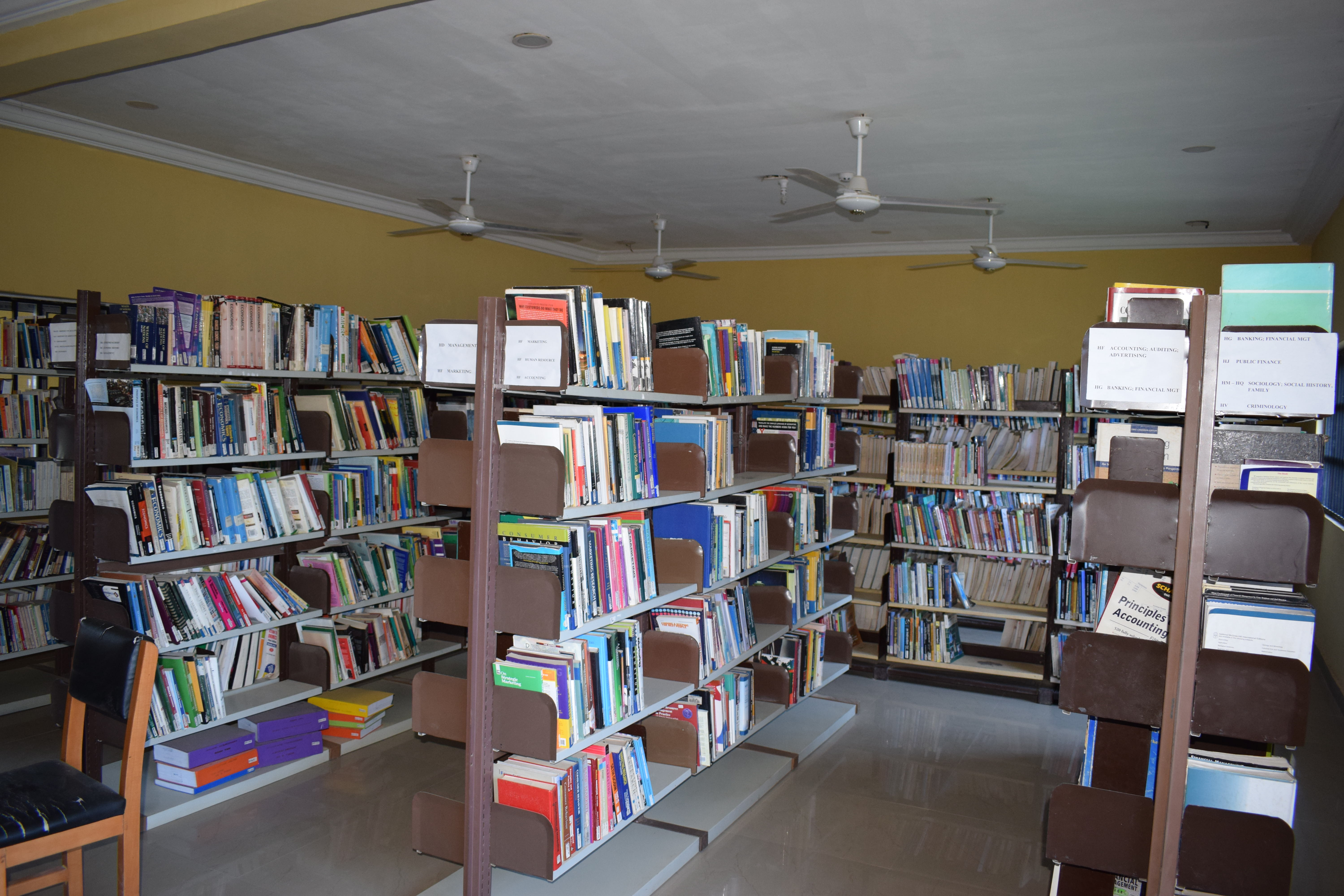
School Library

== Accreditation ==
A provisional license to operate the university was granted by the National Universities Commission in May 2007. As of 2019, there were over 30 undergraduate and 15 postgraduate programmes offered by the university, which have passed the National Universities Commission (NUC) accreditation and resource verification.

In March 2019, Veritas University awarded certificates to 141 graduating students for its 2017/18 academic session at its 7th convocation ceremony.

== Veritas Journal of Humanities ==
The Veritas Journal of Humanities (VEJOH) is the official maiden multidisciplinary academic journal of Veritas University from the Humanities Faculty published bi-annually. It is based on the following principles; Afroconstructivity, Humanity, Society and Development. Articles come from scholars within and outside Africa.

== Gallery ==
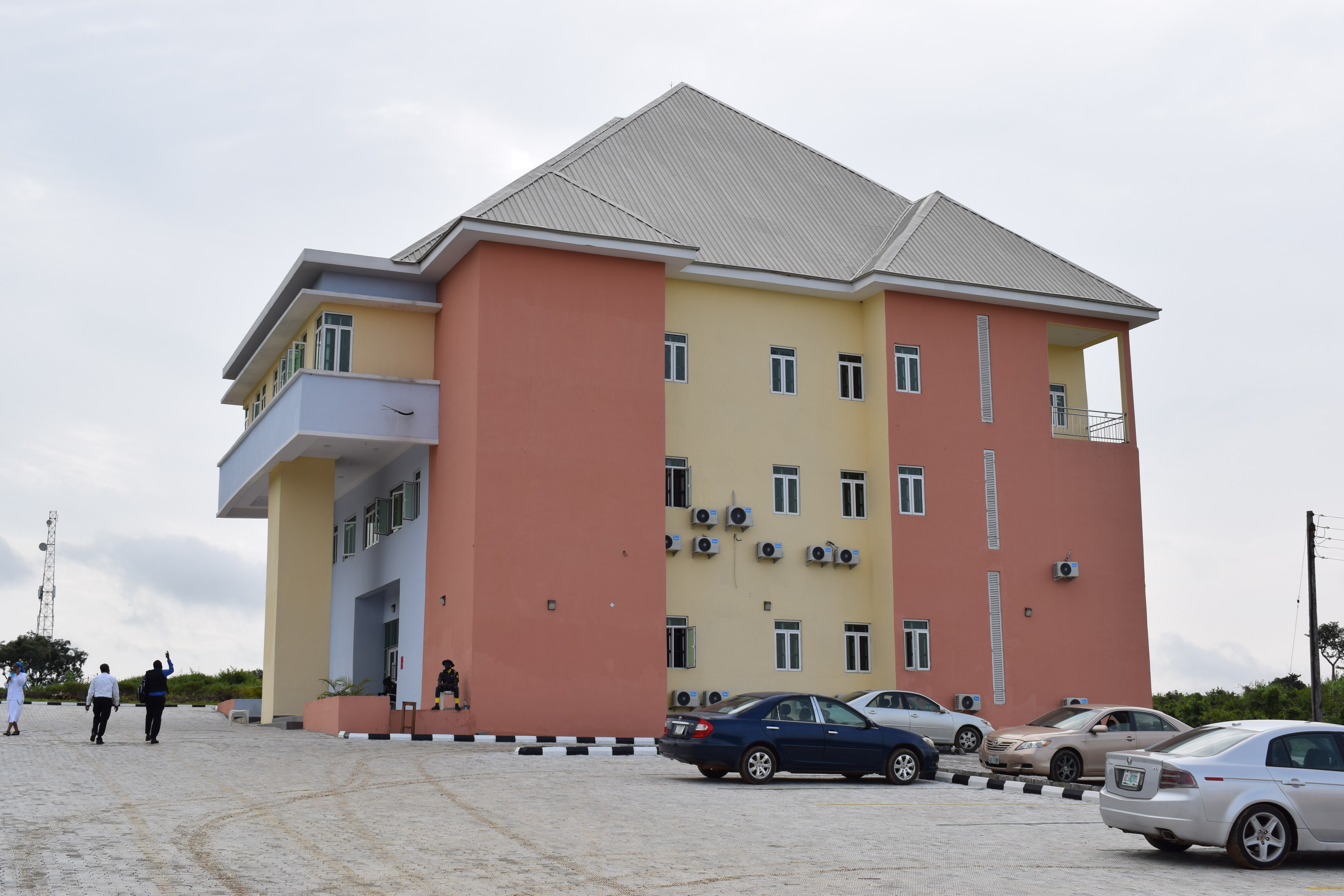
Administrative block

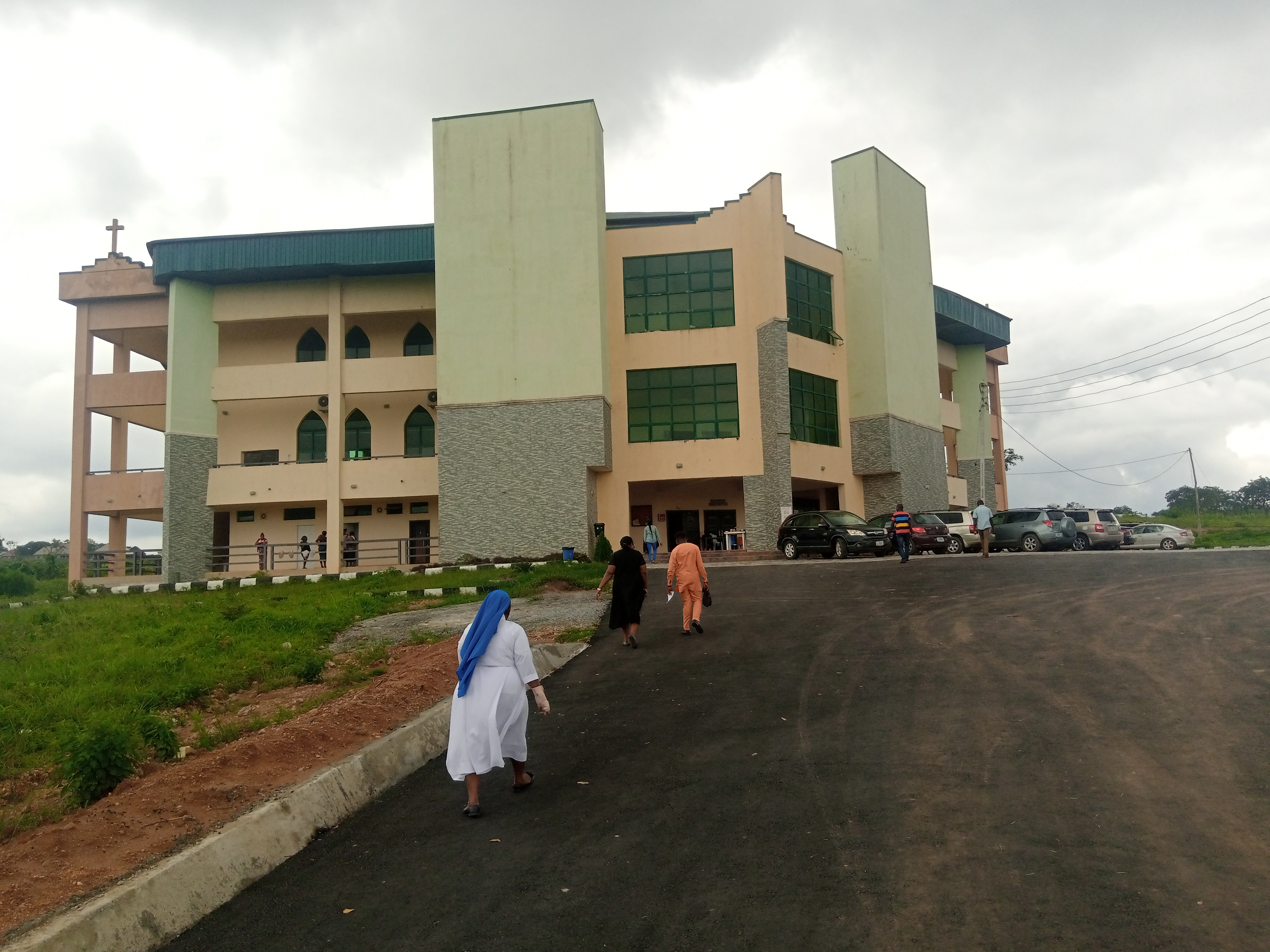
University chapel building

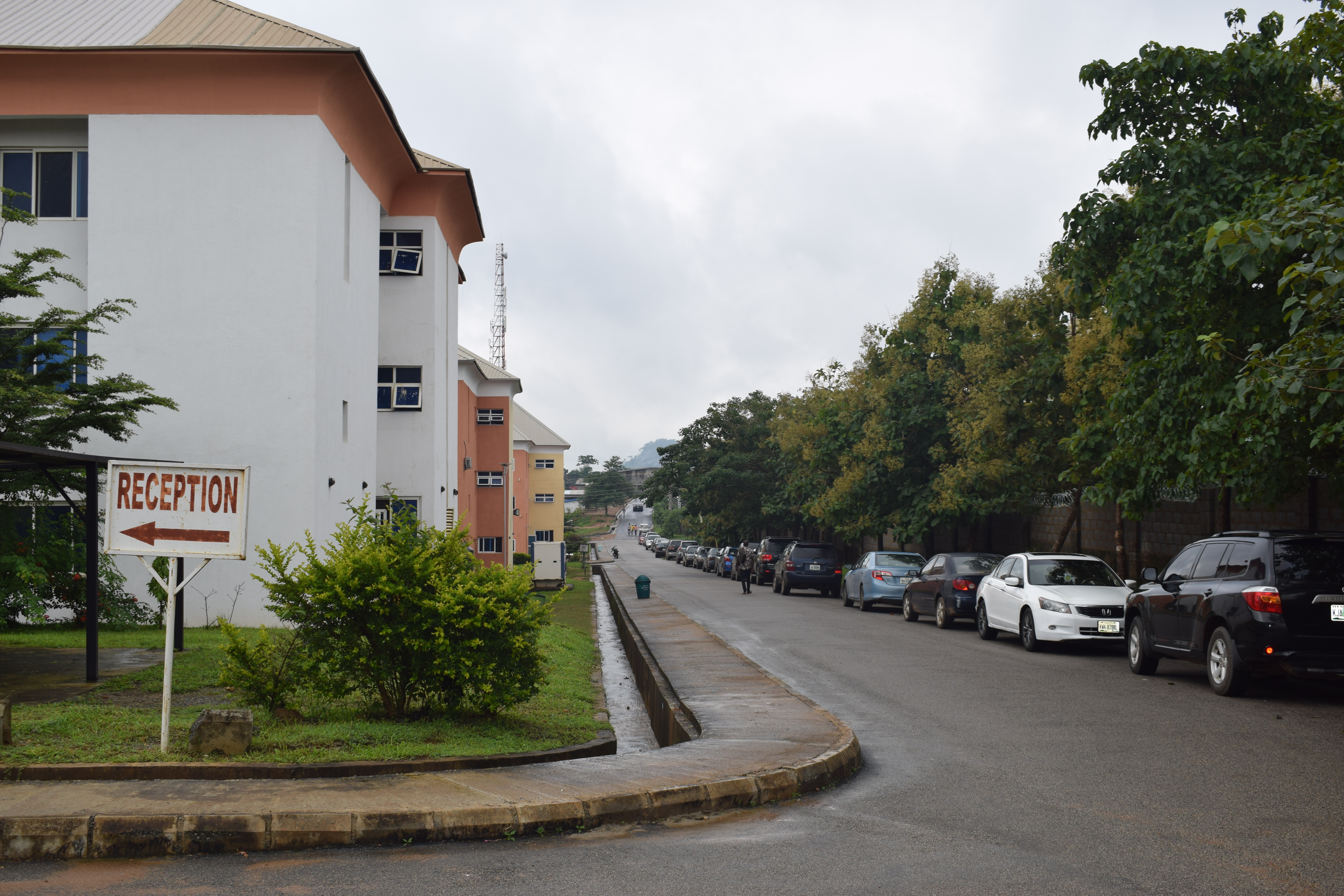
Block of classrooms

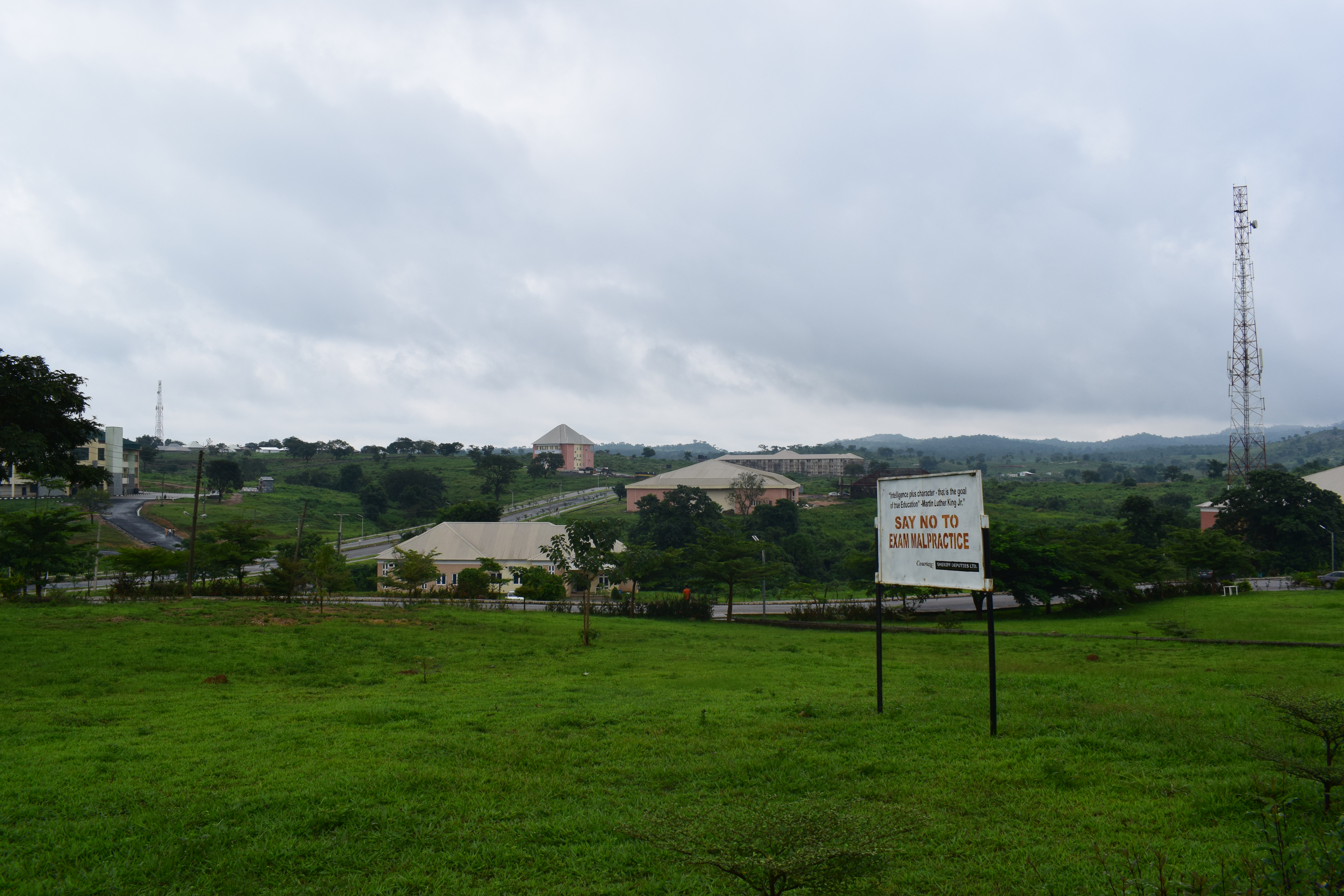
Campus with chapel and admin buildings in view

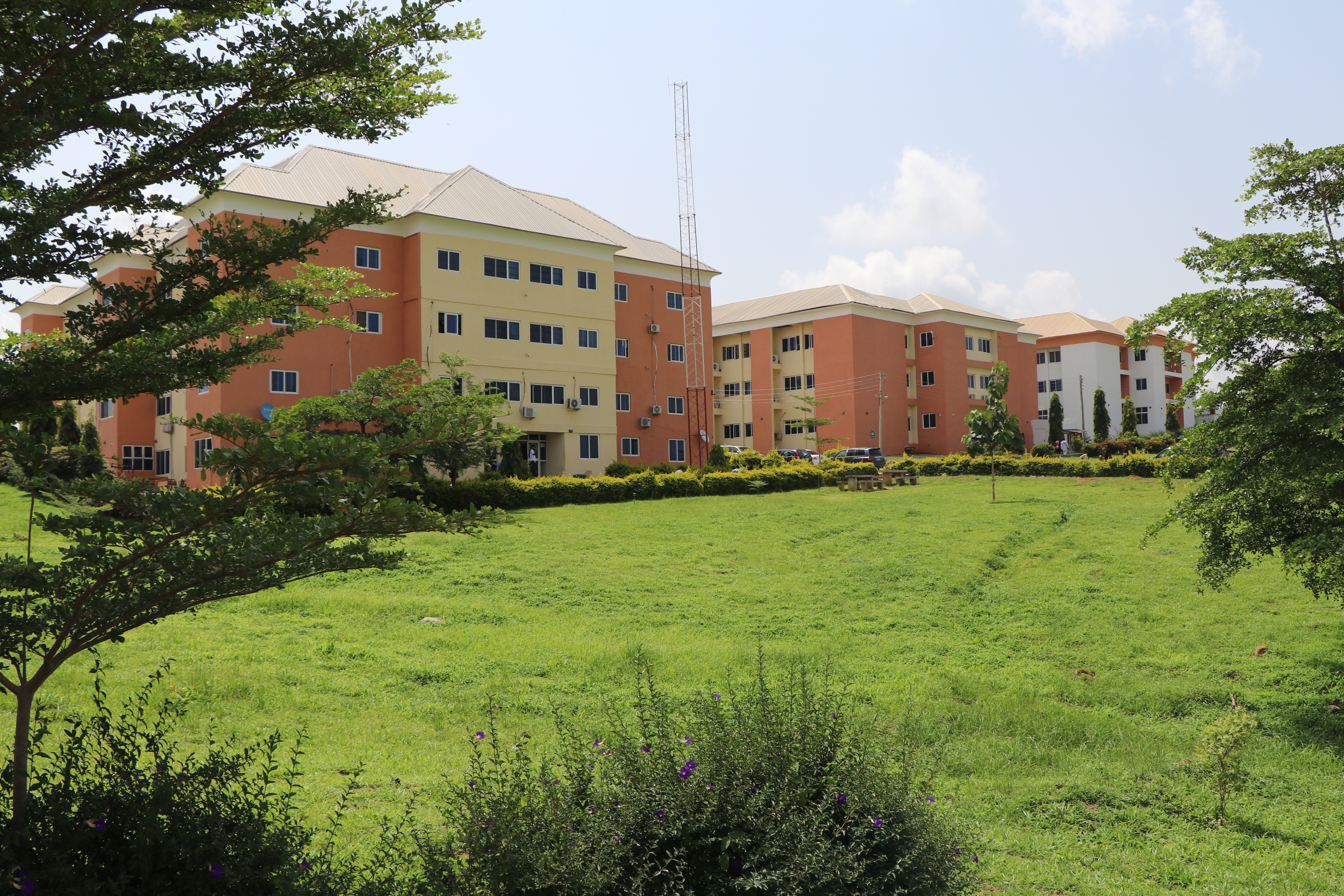
Blocks A, B & C

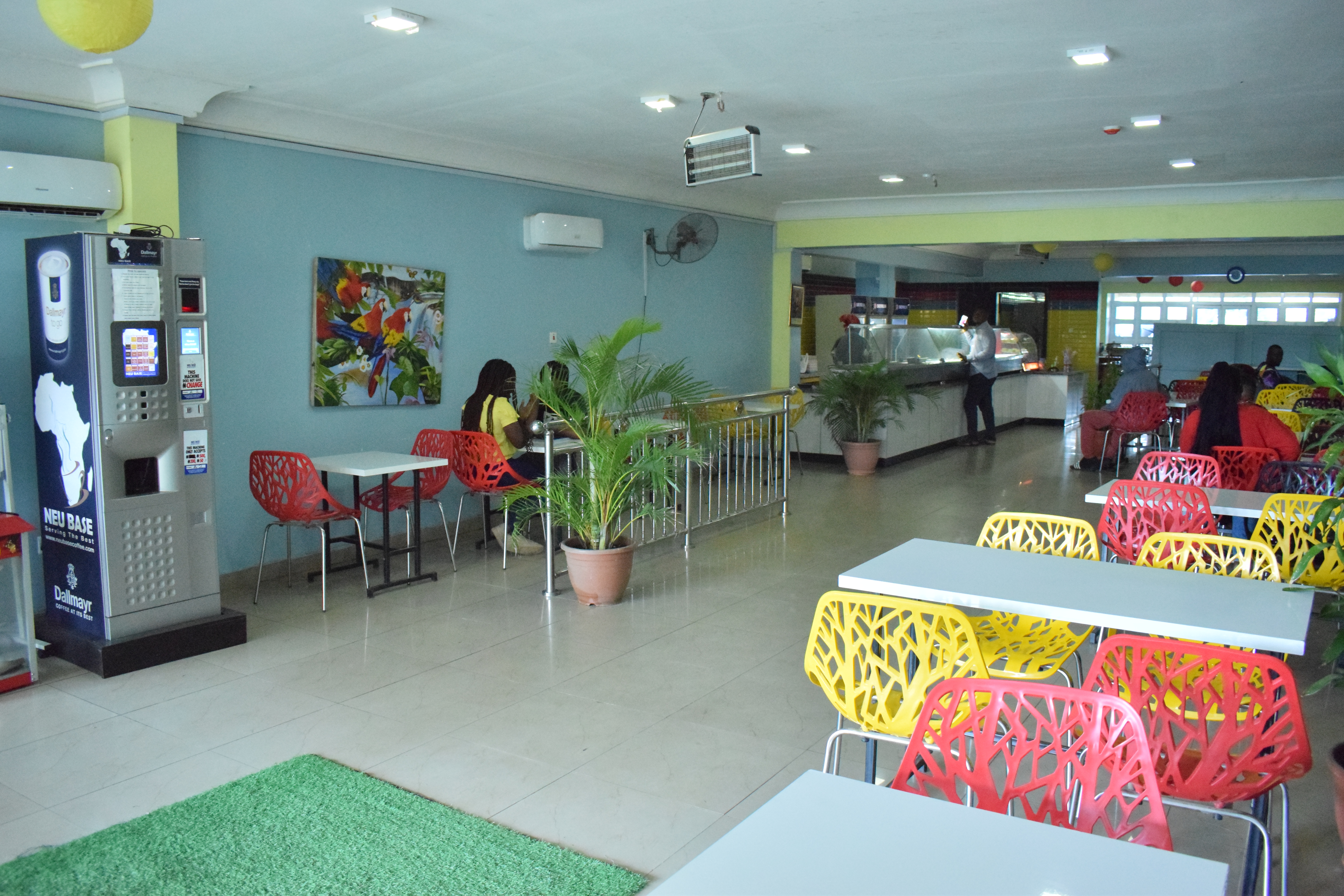
School Canteen (Ase)

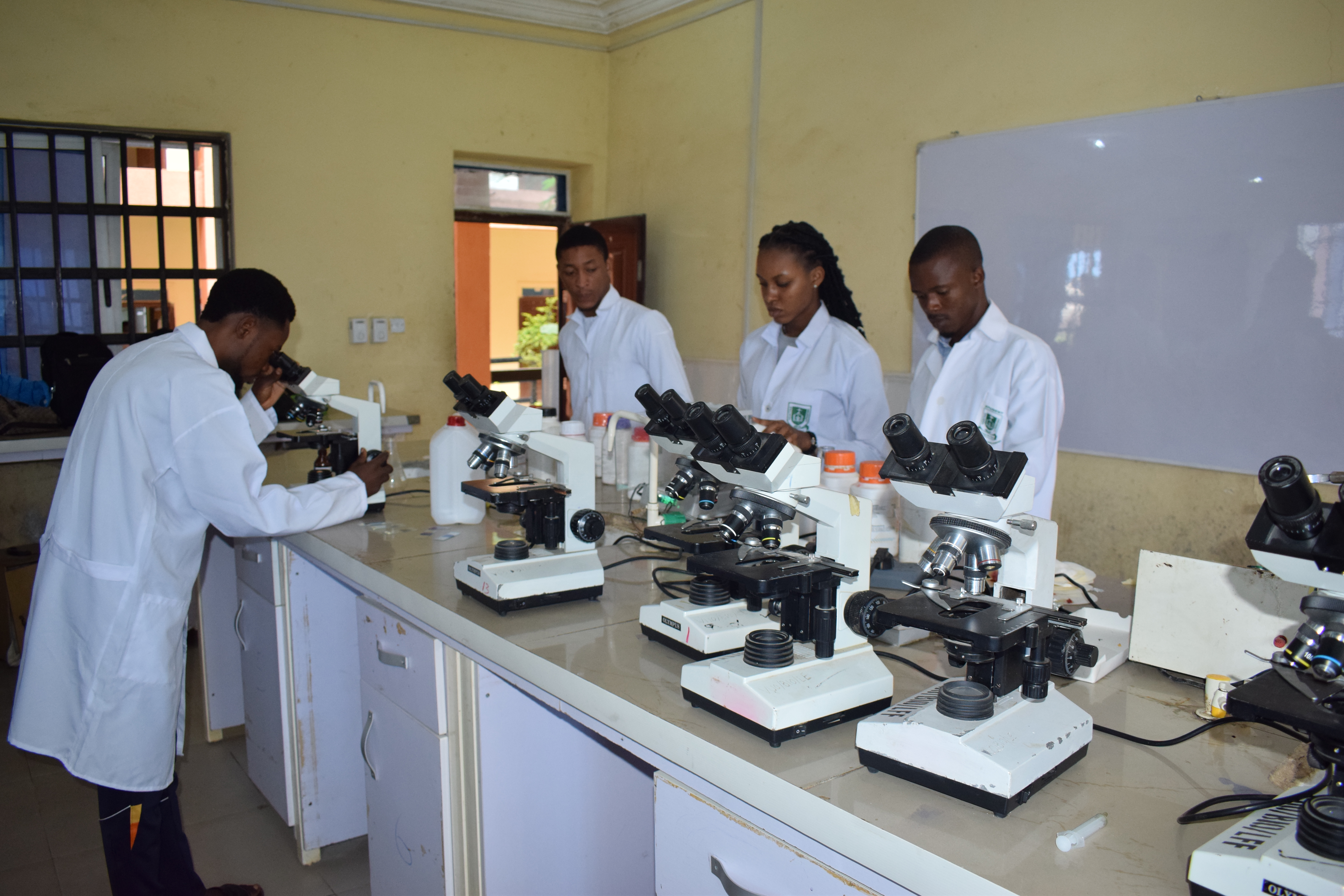
Biology Laboratory

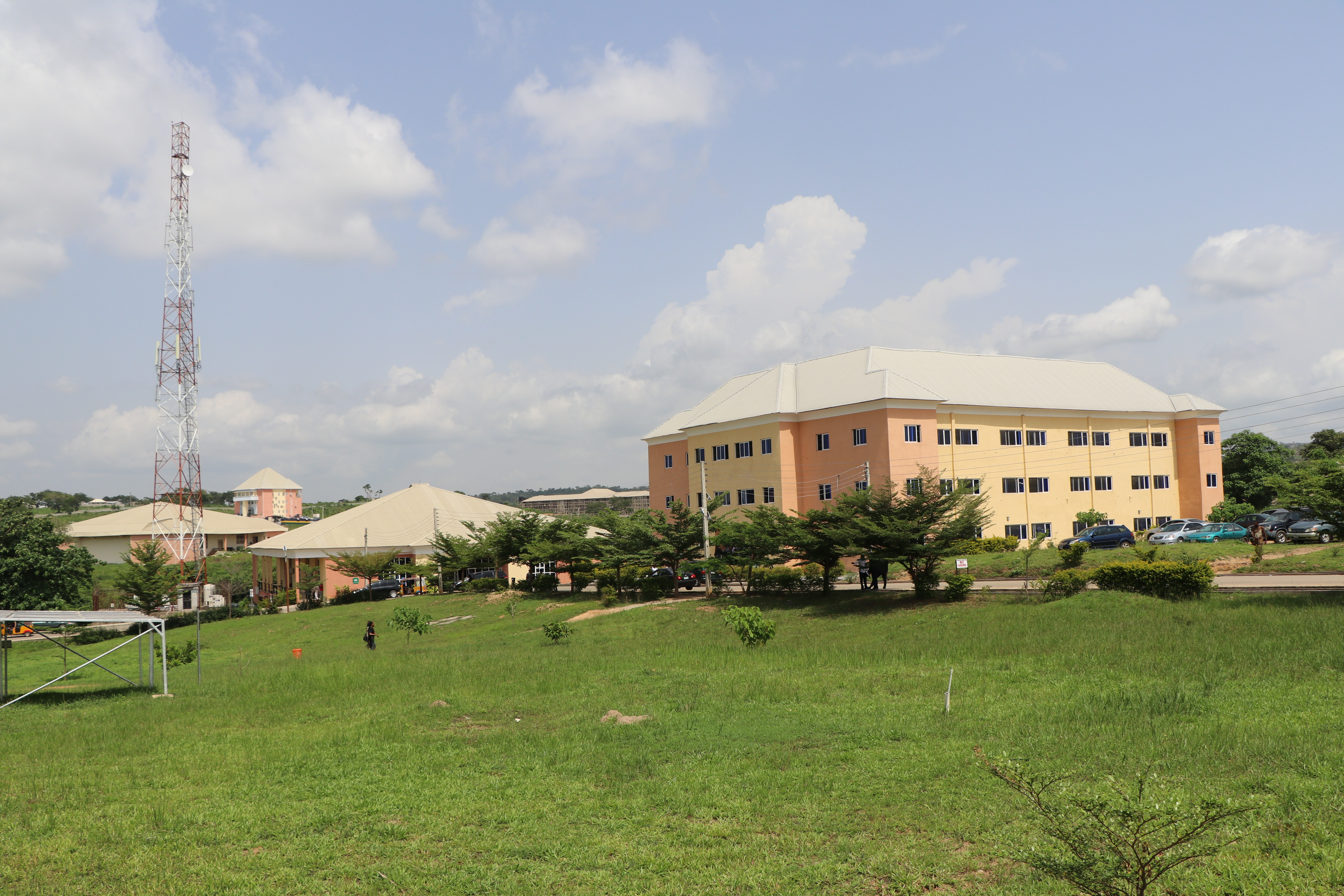
Side view of block D, multi purpose hall and Auditorium

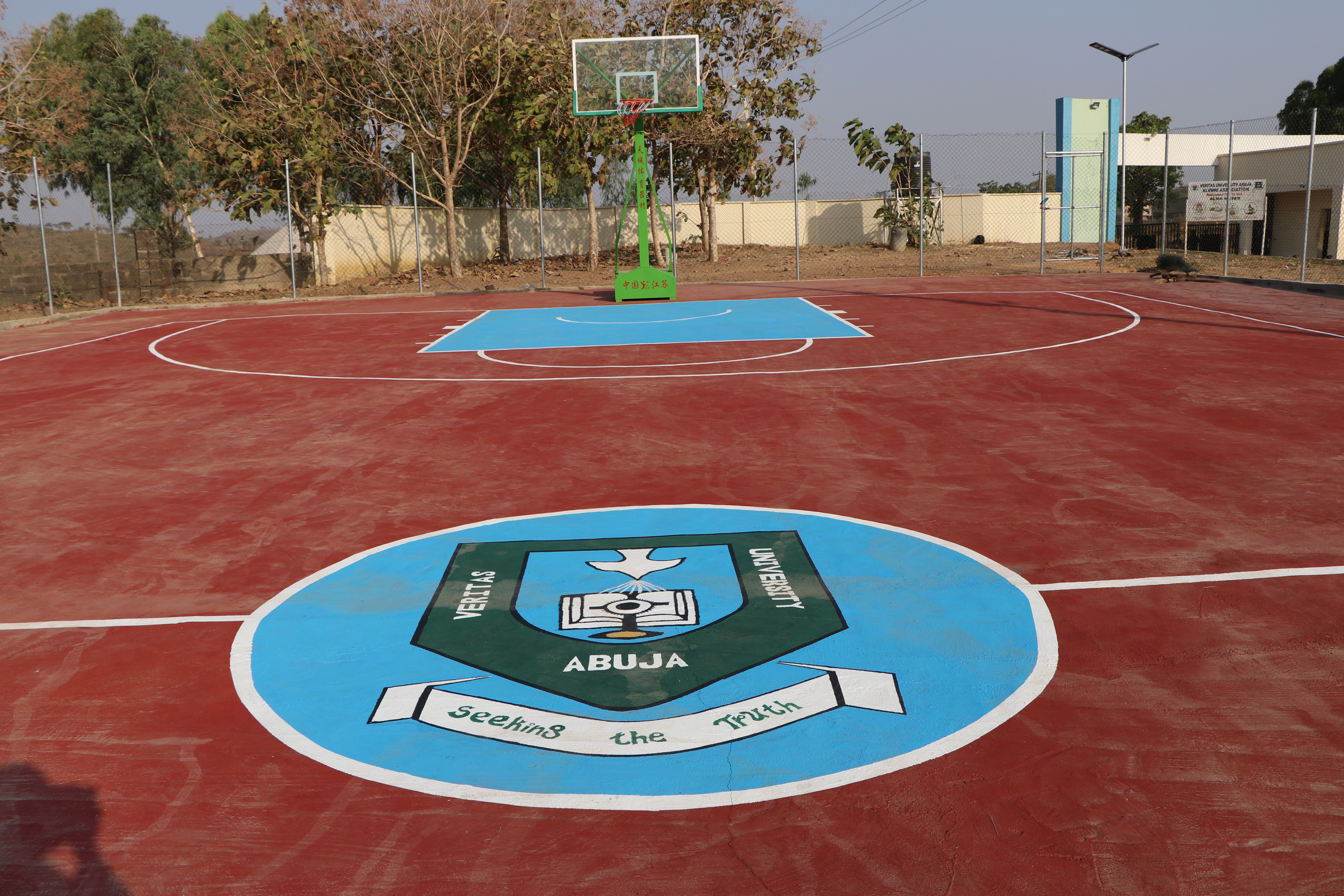
Basketball court

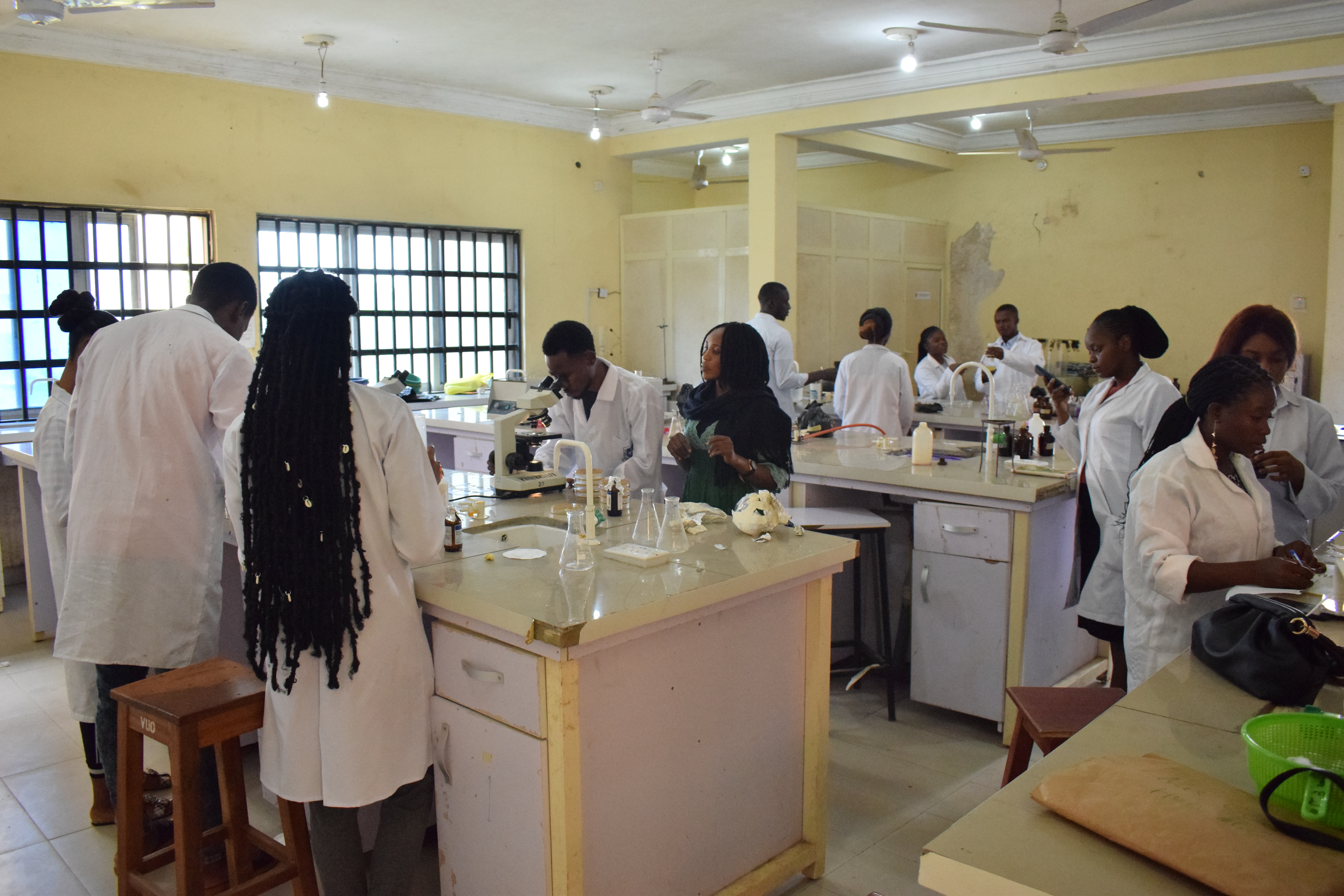
Science Laboratory

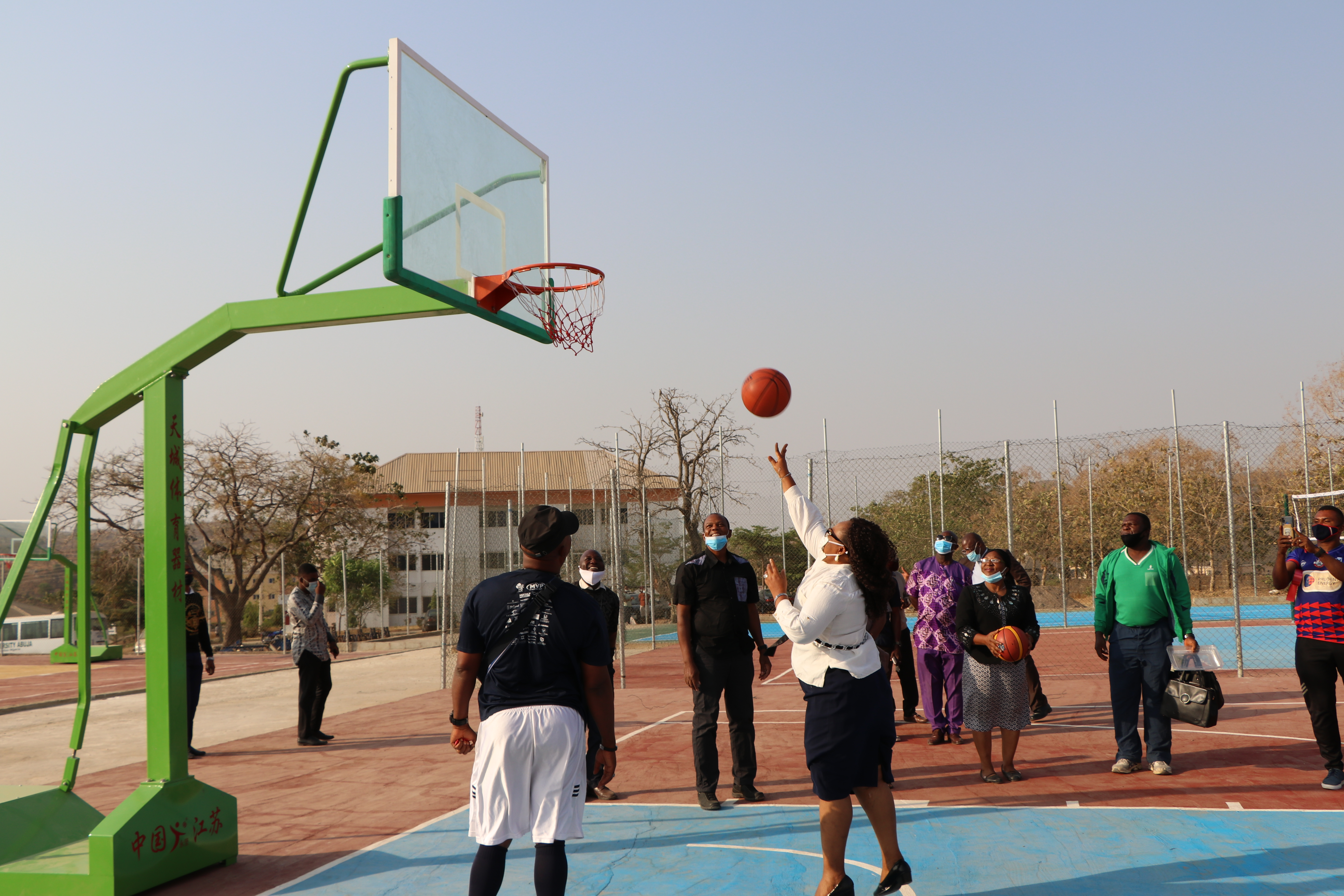
Sport activity

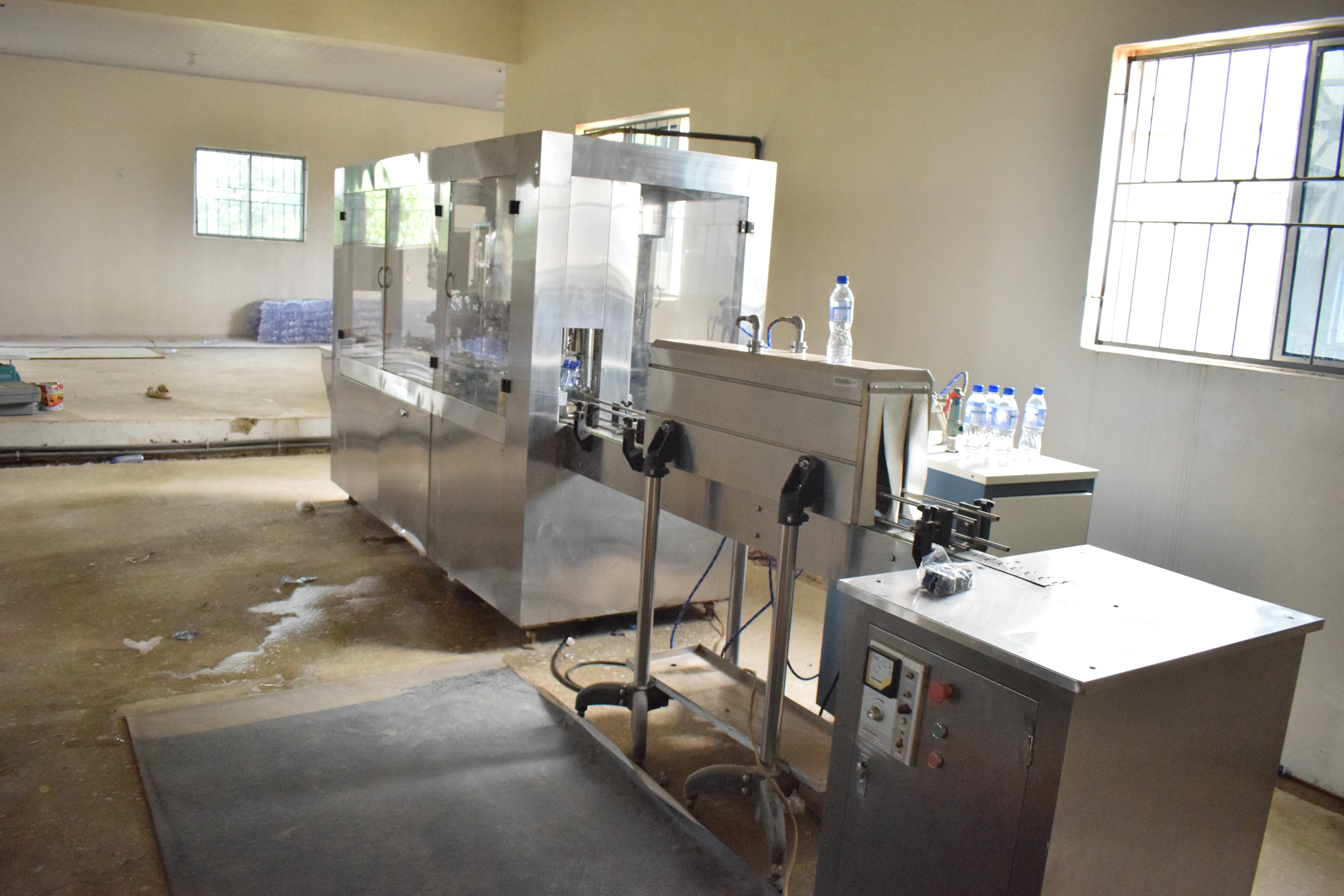
Water processing factory

== See also ==
- Academic libraries in Nigeria
