= Licentiate =

Post-graduate academic degree

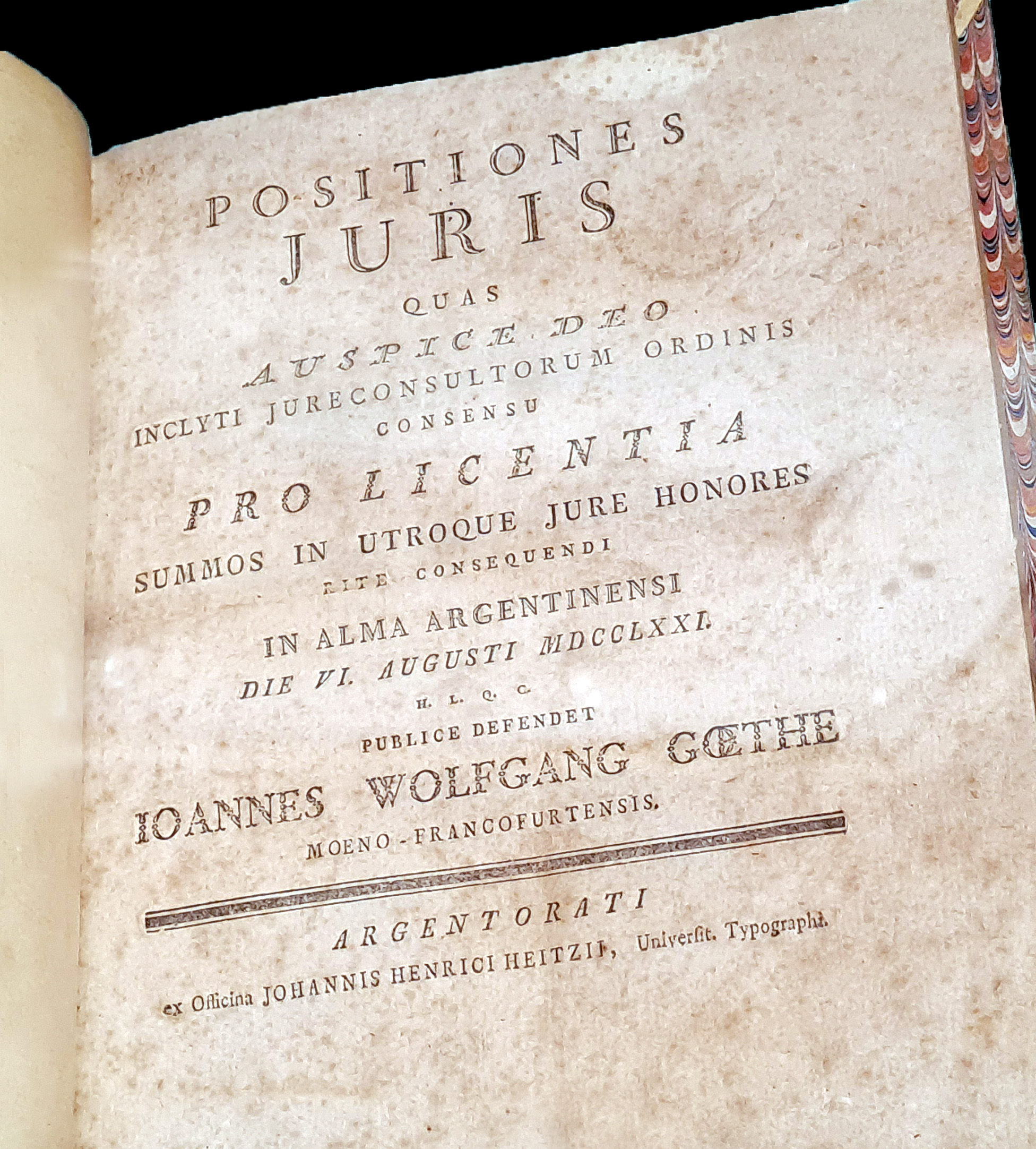
Licentiate dissertation (note text Pro Licentia on cover) of Johann Wolfgang von Goethe (University of Strasbourg, 1771)

A licentiate (abbreviated Lic.) is an academic degree awarded in many countries, by a variety of types of educational (usually tertiary) institutions, after a variety of courses of study. It can represent completion of study at different educational levels, in Europe it is commonly for postgraduate studies program.

The canonical licentiate is also a postgraduate degree preparatory to a ecclesiastical doctoral degree when issued by pontifical universities and certain other universities in Europe. The ecclesiastical licentiate in the civil system is considered similar to the coursework and exams of a Doctor of Philosophy program.

The term is also used for a person who holds this degree.

== Etymology ==
The term derives from Latin licentia, "freedom" (from Latin licere, "to be allowed"), which is applied in the phrases licentia docendi (also licentia doctorandi), meaning "permission to teach", and licentia ad practicandum (also licentia practicandi), meaning "permission to practice", signifying someone who holds a certificate of competence to practise a profession.

== History ==
The Gregorian Reform of the Catholic Church led to an increased focus on the liberal arts in episcopal schools during the 11th and 12th centuries, with Pope Gregory VII (pope 1073-1085) ordering all bishops to make provision for the teaching of liberal arts in their dioceses. Educational officials in a diocese or school (chancellors and scholasters) exercised a high degree of control over who could teach within their locus magisterii — the geographical area in which they had authority to regulate teaching and schools. Throughout the 12th century, their control tightened to such an extent that they essentially had regulatory monopolies over all teachers in their diocese or area; thus, potential teachers were barred from acting as instructors without the explicit authorization of their scholasters. Thus arose the licentia as a licence or permission or authority to conduct one's professional work: as an educator.

Conflicts then sometimes arose between scholasters and local independent educators, who might for example have taught at, or operated an educational facility, without church permission. Additionally, chancellors often improperly demanded expensive gifts before granting a person a license to teach: a form of church corruption or simony. In response to these issues and otherwise escalating abuses of power, Pope Alexander III (pope 1159-1181) demanded that a free licentia docendi should be granted to anyone deemed qualified to teach. This allowed the Church in Rome, over time, to centralize and doctrinalise its educational control: reducing the power of individual scholasters locally to regulate teachers, but maintaining some doctrinal orthodoxy or harmony throughout the Christian world as to what content should be taught.

Originally, for the student in the medieval university the licentia docendi was of a somewhat different nature than the academic degrees of bachelor, master or doctor. The latter degrees essentially indicated the rank or seniority of the holder in her faculty or subject matter/professional/practice area (eg, law, arts, theology, or medicine). In a different way, the licentia was literally a licence to teach. It was awarded not by a university but by the church, embodied in the chancellor of the diocese in which the university was located. The licentia would only be awarded, however, upon recommendation by the university, initially shortly before the candidate would be awarded the degree of master or doctor (the requirements for which, beyond having been awarded the licentia, were only of a ceremonial nature).

Over time, however, this distinction in nature between the licentia on the one hand and the bachelor, master and doctor degrees on the other began to fade. In the continental European universities the licentia became an academic degree intermediate between the bachelor's degree on the one hand and the master's or doctor's degree on the other, in particular in the so-called 'higher' faculties. Moreover, the costs for obtaining the doctorate degree, in particular, could be significant. As a result, most students not intending an academic career would forgo the doctorate, and the licentiate became a common highest-obtained degree for those who had pursued some additional study (beyond that required for their initial, usually Bachelor's, degree).

Notable exceptions to this ongoing development in the use and status of the licentate were the universities of Oxford and Cambridge, and the universities modelled after them. As their locations were not the seats of bishops, the granting of the licentia docendi was by proxy, and its significance faded away. In many such places other 'intermediate' (ie non-terminal) postgraduate, or pre-doctoral postgraduate degrees took the place of what began to be called the licentiate in Europe: most often these were masters programs with a degree that could then, with some years of further research or doctoral work, be 'converted' to a PhD or DPhil.

== Canonical Licentiate (Theology) ==
The pontifical or canonical licentiate is a post-graduate, research degree, considered above the master's degree and below the research doctoral degree, conferred by authority of the Holy See by a pontifical university or ecclesiastical faculty upon completion of studies in one of the sacred sciences.

In the civil system, the licentiate would be considered similar to the coursework and exams of a Doctor of Philosophy program.

The pontifical licentiate is a canonical pre-requisite for entrance into a pontifical doctoral program: "Nobody can be admitted to the doctorate unless first having obtained the licentiate."

The 1983 Code of Canon Law mandates that certain roles, such as bishops (canon 378 §1) or judges in ecclesiastical tribunals (canon 1421 §3), require at least a Licentiate in sacred scripture, theology, or canon law from an institute approved by the Holy See.

Notably, a licentiate also grants the holder the "licence" (which is usually necessary but is of course not sufficient by itself) to teach at any ecclesiastical institution globally.

This type of licentiate may be conferred in any of the sacred sciences, including theology, philosophy or canon law, such as the Licentiate of Canon Law (JCL), the Licentiate of Sacred Theology (STL), the Licentiate in Sacred Scripture, or the Licentiate of Philosophy (PhL). Pontifical universities and Catholic Universities with Ecclesiastical Faculties all confer such degrees. Thus, the list of tertiary institutions awarding these licentiates includes:

- Pontifical Lateran University
- Pontifical Gregorian University,
- Pontifical University of the Holy Cross
- Pontifical Athenaeum of Sant'Anselmo (Anselmanium)
- Pontifical Salesian University
- Pontifical University of Antonianum
- Pontifical University of Saint Thomas Aquinas, Angelicum in Rome
- Pontifical Athenaeum Dharmaram Vidya Kshetram
- Pontifical University of Salamanca in Spain
- Pontifical University of Mexico in Mexico
- Pontifical and Royal University of Santo Tomas in Manila (Philippines),
- The Catholic University of America in Washington, DC
- University of Saint Mary of the Lake in Mundelein, IL, and
- Regis College in Toronto, Canada

The Pontifical Institute of Mediaeval Studies in Toronto awards a licentiate in Mediaeval studies, but, unusually, only offers it as a postdoctoral degree. (Cf. the Canada section below.)

== General and other licentiates: regional variants ==
=== Argentina ===
In Argentina, the Licentiate degree (Spanish: Licenciatura), by which one becomes a licenciado, is a four to six-year degree with a required final thesis defence. The Licentiate is a professional degree distinct from the Bachelor of Arts, Bachelor of Commerce (Perito Mercantil), Bachelor of Technology, or Bachelor of Science. Upon competition of the Licentiate degree, the student may be eligible to apply for a postgraduate degree such as a master or doctorate.

=== Australia ===
The Catholic Institute of Sydney is a Pontifical Faculty and as such offers the Licentiate of Sacred Theology which ranks above a master's degree and can only be earned after seven years of study (five years for the S.T.B.; two years for the S.T.L.). The licentiate is part of the three cycles of theological education in the Roman Catholic Church that was instituted in 1931: baccalaureate (STB); licentiate (STL) and doctorate (STD). It is the licentiate that licences faculty to teach in seminaries. See John Paul II's apostolic constitution, Sapientia Christiana.

=== Belgium ===
At Belgian universities, a person titled Licentiate (or Licentiaat in Dutch or Licencié in French, abbreviated lic.) holds the equivalent education of a master's degree. A female Licentiate was called Licentiate in Dutch and Licenciée in French. The years spent to obtain the degree of Licentiate were called Licentiaat or Licentie in Dutch and Licence in French. It was the second level of university study, after that of Candidate (or Kandidaat in Dutch or Candidat in French, abbreviated cand.). A female Candidate was called Kandidate in Dutch and Candidate in French. The years spent to obtain the degree of Candidate were called Kandidaats or Kandidatuur in Dutch and Candidature in French. Each of those two levels required at least two years (four semesters) of successful study. Licentiates were required to write a thesis (called licentiaatsverhandeling in Dutch and mémoire de licence in French). This candidate-licentiate system is now being replaced by an American-style bachelor-master system. Civil engineer (or Burgerlijk ingenieur in Dutch or Ingénieur civil in French, abbreviated ir.), Doctor of Medicine (or Doctor in de geneeskunde in Dutch or Docteur en médecine in French, abbreviated dr. med., until 1992), Physician (or Arts in Dutch or Médecin in French, after 1992), Doctor of Law (or Doctor in de rechten in Dutch or Docteur en droit in French, abbreviated dr. iur., until 1972) and Magister (philosophy and theology, abbreviated mag.) were equivalent to Licentiate. Baccalaureus (philosophy and theology, abbreviated bac.) was equivalent to Candidate. The former titles dr. med. and dr. iur. are to be considered as professional doctorates, whereas the title dr., which is the result of third level study and research, is a higher doctorate. The Belgian licentiate was also equivalent to the doctorandus in the Netherlands. At the KU Leuven there used to be a degree Licentiaat-doctorandus in de TEW (Toegepaste Economische Wetenschappen) en in Beleidsinformatica. Apart from the general abbreviation lic., more specific abbreviations, such as LHFW (Licentiaat in de Handels- en Financiële Wetenschappen) and LTH (Licentiaat in de Tandheelkunde) exist. Study for a Belgian degree is very rigorous. Students in Belgian universities usually spend more than thirty hours a week on their studies, as opposed to the average of fifteen hours at American universities. As a result of this, students in Belgium are able to complete their licentiate or master's degrees in four to five years, as opposed to the usual six at American institutions.

=== Bolivia ===
In Bolivia, a Licenciatura is a professional degree distinct from the Bachelor of Arts or Bachelor in Science, which are more common in the Anglosphere, as it requires that the student take more credits for the completion of a professional curricula. The Licenciatura allows the holder to practice their profession in all of Bolivia. The durational requirements to obtain a Licenciatura vary depending on the profession studied; however, most universities require the completion of the curricula within four to five years. Aside from the durational requirements, Bolivian universities also require that all candidates, at the completion of the curricula, complement their studies by writing a thesis or by sitting for an oral examination in which State and University representatives take part by testing the student's professional knowledge and skills.

=== Brazil ===
In Brazil, Licenciatura is a professional degree distinct from the Bachelor of Arts or Bachelor of Science, as it requires students to take more credits for the completion of a professional curriculum. The Licenciatura degree allows its holder to teach disciplines both in primary and secondary education. Although durational requirements to obtain Licenciatura often depend on the topic studied, most universities require the completion of the curriculum within four to five years. Besides the durational requirements for academic activities, Brazilian universities may also require that degree candidates complement their studies by writing a dissertation and apply for an oral examination. This evaluation is performed by Professors and or Researchers aiming to assess the student's professional knowledge and skills.

For instance, as defined by the Brazilian National Council of Education (Ministry of Education), a Licenciatura modality in Biological Sciences should include, in addition to specific topics of Biology, contents in the areas of Chemistry, Physics and Health, to attend elementary and secondary education. Pedagogical training, in addition to its specificities, should contemplate an overview of the education and the formative processes of the students. It should also emphasize the instrumentation for the teaching of Sciences at the fundamental level and for the teaching of biology at the intermediate level. In some Brazilian universities, Bachelor's degree and Licenciatura can be obtained concomitantly, by simultaneously fulfilling requirements for both the degrees (e.g. the Bachelor's and Licenciatura degrees in Biological Sciences, offered by the Pontifical Catholic University of Minas Gerais, Brazil).

=== Canada ===
Saint Paul University offers the degree of Licentiate in Philosophy by examination, which may be undertaken within ten years of receiving an MA from the Department of Philosophy at the University of Ottawa. This licentiate, a pontifical degree, qualifies graduates to teach philosophy at a seminary or college. Saint Paul University also offers a Licentiate in Canon Law that enables the recipient to practice as a canon lawyer within the Roman Catholic Church, as well as a Licentiate in Sacred Theology which is part of the baccalaureate, licentiate, and doctorate theological degree course within the Roman Catholic Church.

Regis College, University of Toronto offers the degree of Licentiate in Sacred Theology. It is part of the cycle of baccalaureate, licentiate, doctorate in theological formation in the Roman Catholic Church. It can be earned while studying for a civil master's or doctoral degree. It probably sits in rank between the two levels. See John Paul II's apostolic constitution, Sapientia Christiana.

The Pontifical Institute of Mediaeval Studies at the University of Toronto offers a License in Mediaeval Studies (LMS) as a degree exclusively for postdoctoral students who have already completed a PhD. (The application for the LMS refers to it as a "licentiate" and not as a "license".) The degree is unusual in that licentiates from Pontifical institutions are usually a precursor to a doctorate, and not a post-doctoral achievement.

=== Costa Rica ===
In Costa Rica, a licentiate belongs to the second level of education (grade), lower than a master's degree but higher than a bachelor's degree, according to the Office for the Planning of Higher Education, part of the National Council of Rectors. Licentiate is extended to those who have fulfilled the requirements of a university program that has a minimum of 150 and a maximum of 180 course credits (public university programs usually last from four to six years of study) and a minimum duration of 10 lesson cycles of 15 weeks or its equivalent (three or four extra course semesters after the completion of the bachelor's degree).

Students are also required to fulfill the requirements for graduation for each institution, which usually requires writing a thesis in some universities, attending a graduation seminar, or developing a project in order to graduate, and some degrees involve the same credits as a master's degree but not the same level of rigor. This is also the degree conferred to a practicing physician. The degree is not considered terminal, and it is not sufficient to be a rector of a private university.

=== Denmark and Norway ===
The licentiate was formerly awarded in Denmark and Norway, and was roughly equal to the American PhD degree. In Denmark, it has formally been replaced by the PhD degree. The proper doctorates in Denmark are considered higher degrees than the PhD (i.e. higher doctorates).

=== Dominican Republic ===
In the Dominican Republic, a Licenciatura is awarded to students after studies of four to six years. Some universities require students to write a thesis in order to graduate while others have to write a shorter, and less labor-intensive, monograph. The Licenciatura is one of the major University degree previous to doctoral studies.

=== Finland and Sweden ===
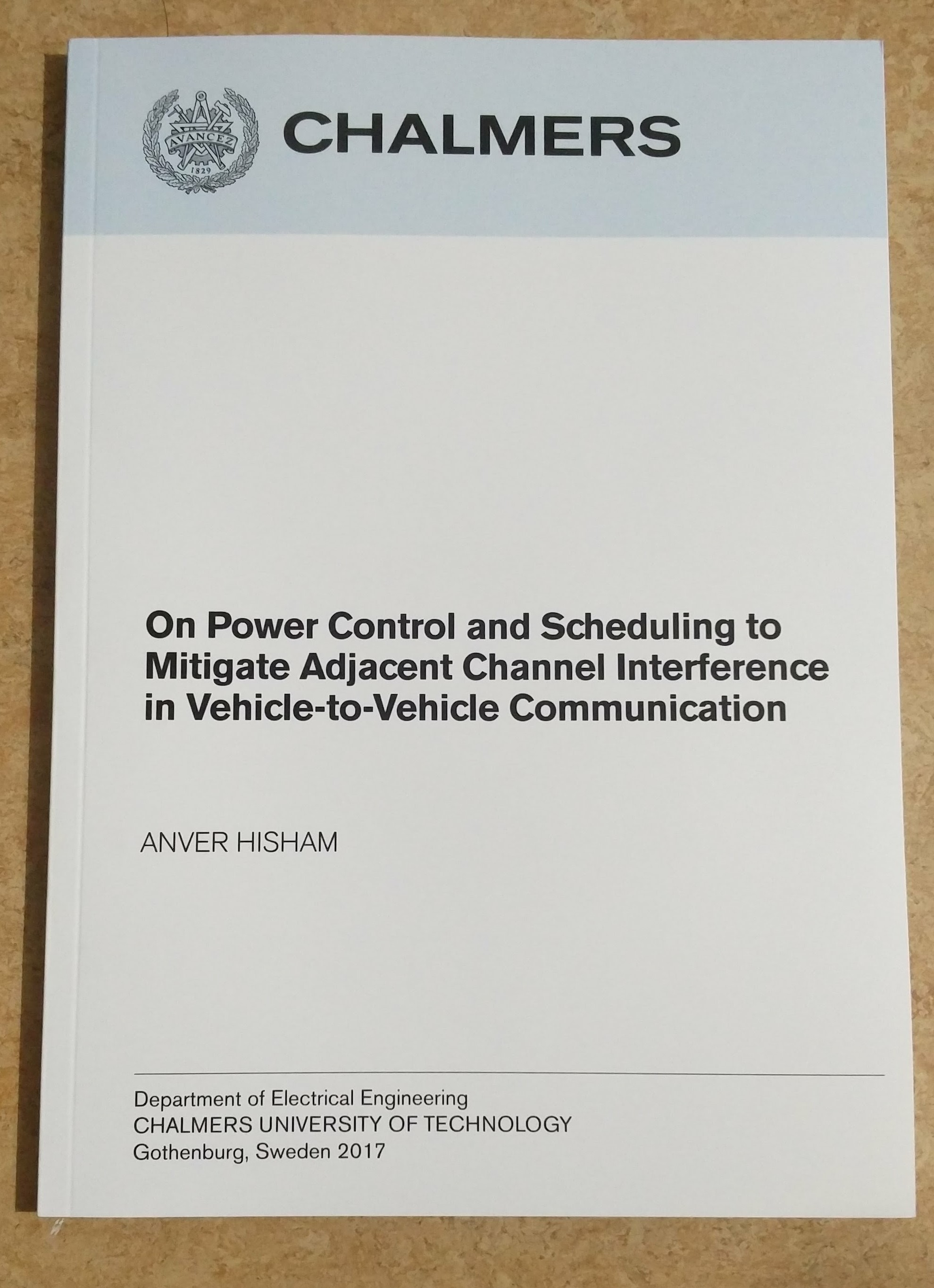
Cover page of a licentiate dissertation from Sweden

In Swedish and Finnish universities, a licentiate's degree, recognised as a pre-doctoral degree, is equal to completion of the coursework and a dissertation which is formally equivalent to half of a doctoral dissertation. In Finland, the extent of licentiate degree is 120 ECTS equivalent and it requires two to three years of full-time research. Its prerequisite is a completed 4-year academic degree at advanced level, such as a Master's degree or a Magister's degree. Licentiate degree holders are officially eligible for independent scientific research in Universities, and entitled to the right to supervise master's and licentiate degree theses.

Until the early 1970s, the degree in Sweden was equivalent to the U.S. PhD requiring four to seven years of study after the Bachelor's (or Master's) degree, and a publicly defended thesis. It was gradually substituted with the "Doctor's exam" in 1969 and was re-instituted as an intermediate level in research training in the 1980s, now requiring only two years of study after Masters graduation. The licentiate's degree is called a filosofie licentiat in Swedish and filosofian lisensiaatti in Finnish (Licentiate of Philosophy), teologie licentiat and teologian lisensiaatti (Licentiate of Theology) etc., depending on the faculty. Furthermore, the requisite degree for a physician's licence is licentiat/lisensiaatti; there is no master's degree. (The degree lääketieteen tohtori, medicine doktor, "Doctor of Medicine" is a traditional professor's degree, or a research doctorate, with licentiate as a prerequisite.)

The Licentiate of Engineering is an intermediate postgraduate degree used only in a few countries, among them Sweden and Finland, and can be seen as an academic step halfway between a Master's and a PhD. In Swedish, it is called Teknologie Licentiat, usually abbreviated as Tekn. Lic., and in Finnish, tekniikan lisensiaatti, abbreviated as TkL. The Licentiate of Engineering corresponds to 120 ECTS credits (80 workweeks (old credits)), or nominally two years of full-time work, whereas a PhD amounts to 240 ECTS credits (160 workweeks (old credits)), or a nominal period of four years of full-time work (one old credit equals one week of full-time studies). However, as a result of the differences in requirements and individual performance, the time to complete a Licentiate of Engineering degree varies. For the thesis, 2–3 peer-refereed articles (or an equivalent monograph) is usually required, and there is no requirement for original research per se. In contrast, a doctoral thesis requires 4–6 articles and must demonstrate original research. The program for a licentiate degree is equivalent to a total of two years of full-time study.

=== France ===
In French universities, a licenciate (licencié(e)) is the holder of a licence (French: [lisãs]), which is a three-year degree, roughly equivalent to a graduate degree. There are two kinds of licence: general and professional.

=== Germany ===
In Germany, a person titled Lizentiat holds the equivalent education of a Master's degree or Diplom. Until the 1990s, the degree was offered as a law degree at the Saarland University as a single university degree (Lic.iur.) with a duration varying between five and eight years. For political reasons, this degree was discontinued, mainly because the Staatsexamen (Law degree) became the predominant representation of the mainstream education of a lawyer. The Lizentiat is largely equivalent to the 1. Staatsexamen but, unlike the latter, is assessed by the university, not the state administration. It also allowed specialisation in areas of the law which were either not covered by other legal qualifications, e.g. ecclesiastical law etc., or not covered to the same extent. In theology Free University of Berlin used to offer a Lizentiat qualification instead of a PhD.

=== Haiti ===
In Haiti universities, a licenciate (licencié(e)) is the holder of a licence, which is a four-year degree, equivalent to a bachelor's degree. There are two kinds of licence: general and professional.

The general licence is a diploma issued by a university and authenticated by the national department of education. This authentication confirms the school follows and complies to the national curriculum requirements for a four-year baccalaureat (bachelor's) degree.

The professional licence is a Certificate licence issued by a university and authenticated national Department of education after the licenciate diploma holder submits a final paper research that have been analyzed and graded by a board of professors or faculty jury member from the school.

=== Mexico ===
As in many Latin American countries, the licenciatura is a general term denoting the first higher-education degree awarded at universities, varying from three to five years of study, depending on the field. It is thus an undergraduate degree, and requires a licence to practice in the learned profession.

In Mexico, a distinction is made between simply passing all the required courses, just being a graduate (graduado or pasante), and actually obtaining the degree diploma (título profesional). Obtaining the diploma means the student completely concluded their studies, and has the right of using the title of Licenciado. Statistics show that historically only about 60% of those graduating actually obtain the diploma. At the same time the diploma is awarded, a professional credential (cédula profesional) may be obtained from the National Directorate of Professions (Dirección General de Profesiones, DGP), which serves as a licence to practice and as a national ID card. Some professions do not require the professional credential, but for others, like medicine, accounting, civil engineering, or social work, it is mandatory by law. The law also establishes penalties for crimes committed regarding the professional practice, including those in which an individual offers professional services without having the proper diploma or licence.

For a number of years, presenting a thesis was the only method to obtain the diploma (título). Nowadays, some universities, like the National Autonomous University of Mexico, may still require the thesis, while others, like the federal institutes of technology, may forgo the thesis in exchange for demonstrating professional experience, research work, or excellent academic grades.

By their nature, some disciplines, such as nursing, medicine and law, require an intense theoretical background, as well as practical training, and so a first university degree in those areas may take longer to complete (up to 6 years). Even after obtaining the diploma, graduates require passing a national exam to finally be awarded the professional licence.

In Mexico, every graduate who obtained a licenciatura diploma is technically and legally a licenciado (abbreviated Lic. before the name). However, it is mostly common to use Lic. for graduates of the social sciences, while more specific titles and prefixes are used for other professionals such as engineer (Ingeniero, Ing.), architect (Arquitecto, Arq.), or biologist (Biólogo, Biol.).

In Mexico, the licenciatura qualifies the recipient to pursue a master's degree (maestría). In exceptional cases, the recipient may apply directly to a doctoral degree (doctorado), in which case the study plan integrates coursework from the master's program, and may take up to five years to complete.

According to the Bologna process in Europe, virtually any licenciado has the equivalent qualifications of a 3-year bachelor's degree. The Mexican licenciatura, however, should never be confused with a more advanced postgraduate degree, such as the Swedish "Licenciate of Technology" (Teknologie Licentiat).

=== Nicaragua ===
In Nicaragua, a Licenciatura is awarded to students after undergraduate studies ranging between four and six years. Students are required to write a thesis if studying in the liberal arts, law or science in order to graduate. Students in engineering typically complete módulos, which are additional post-degree requirements before graduating. Additionally, there are Nicaraguan universities that require an internship (internado or pasantía) prior to graduation. The Licenciatura is the degree that segues candidates into both masters and/or PhD programs.

=== Panama ===
This degree is awarded upon completion of four years of study in a specific field of study – e.g., Licenciatura de Docencia en inglés (Licentiate in Teaching of English), and qualifies the recipient to pursue a master's degree, or teach at a high school or middle school level with additional training. In order to be able to teach at university level, the recipient of a licentiate must complete the Posgrado de Docencia Superior (Postgraduate of Tertiary Education), which may be obtained before or after a master's degree.

=== Peru ===
In Peru, "Bachiller" is awarded automatically for having completed all the courses required for obtaining the first academic degree. In Peru, a "Bachiller" degree is the first academic degree and allows one to enroll in a master's degree course. The master's degree is the second degree and it allows you to get a Doctor's degree (equivalent to a PhD).

The "Licenciatura" in Peru is not considered an academic degree, but rather a "Professional Title" within a specific profession which allows you to work in positions outside academia and perform as an independent professional in the Republic of Peru. Most professions require the "Licenciatura" or "Professional Title" to be able to register with professional association or society (Colegio Profesional). To obtain a "Licenciatura" it is required to either pass an additional test or defend a thesis. Although most Bachelor courses in Peru require to complete "Thesis work" or "Thesis seminars" modules(usually developing a research project during the last two semesters of the course) to obtain the degree, it is not mandatory to defend it. To obtain a "Licenciatura" or "Título Profesional" the student is required to write a thesis (usually that developed during their bachelor course), and pass their viva voce. Alternatively, it is possible to complete a written exam and then an oral examination in front of a group of professors (who are registered in the professional college/body of that specific profession). With this last option, it is usually required to have at least one year of professional experience in the relevant field of studies. Therefore, for some professions which used to be called "carreras largas" or long careers (e.g. dentistry, law, psychology and medicine), the student requires more than five years of studies or ten semesters to become a member of a professional body.

Nowadays, some universities do not use the word Licenciado or Licenciada as a prefix before the professional title, e.g. Licenciado/a en Farmacia y Bioquímica (Licentiate in Pharmacy and Biochemistry) in their certificates. Instead they use Químico Farmacéutico, the same happens in with the other professions (i.e. Enfermero, Ingeniero, Psicólogo.) In such cases, both written titles are equivalent. The Professional Titles in Peru are equivalent to the professional degrees in the US, therefore if a person obtained a Master in Counselling degree in the US will need to complete the university studies in Peru in order to obtain the Licenciate or Title of Psychologist and then the Licensure at the Colegio de Psicólogos del Perú. In Peru the Professional Title of Psicólogo is similar to the Psy.D which is given in the US.

=== Poland ===
A licencjat is a degree that was introduced in Poland by the tertiary education reforms. The purpose of these reforms was to bring the Polish university system into line with the Bologna system. It is typically a three- or four-year degree, equivalent to a bachelor's degree. Students completing a licencjat often go on to complete a magister's degree. In theology faculties which use Vatican-regulated degrees, licencjat is a degree between that of master and doctor.

=== Portugal ===
Due to the developments introduced by the Bologna Process in the mid-2000s, in Portugal the licentiate's degree (Licenciatura) may refer to both old and new Licenciaturas, which were awarded before and after the Bologna's reforms, respectively. The length of the old Licenciatura programs would range from four to six years and are now equivalent to the new Master's degrees. In the past, a master's degree would add 2 more years to the 4 to 6 years of the old undergraduate Licenciatura programs, thus taking 6 to 8 years of post-secondary education to obtain a master's degree. The new Licenciatura degrees that are now being awarded in Portugal and in almost all Europe with varying local designations, are usually three-year programs.

Since 2006, in the Portuguese higher education system, Licenciatura is the first degree awarded by institutions of higher education. It is also the first degree used in the European Higher Education Area, and is also designated a Bachelor's degree in other European countries. The Master's degree entails a two-year program of study, in which students can normally enroll after completing a licentiate's degree, and provides higher qualification for employment (e.g., for Architecture or Medicine a Master's is required, as well as for some Engineering branches, entailing a total of 5 to 6 years of post-secondary studies) or to prepare a student for their PhD research or work permit from the regulatory and licensing body for profession in Portugal.

=== Romania ===
In Romania, before the Bologna process, a licence (Rom. licenţă) was an academic degree awarded after four to six years of study, finalised by a thesis. It was a degree higher than the graduate diploma obtained after three years of study, which was mostly used in pedagogical institutes that trained secondary education teachers, and was considered inferior to the doctorate. A Romanian licence was the equivalent of a French maîtrise or a German Diplom. There are some Romanian licences (obtained before the Bologna process was of application) which have been recognized as meester (mr.) and doctorandus (drs.) in the Netherlands, i.e. at the LLM and MA level. Now, after the Bologna process, the Romanian licence is similar to a Bachelor's degree.

=== Spain ===
In Spain, the Licenciatura degree was one of the major higher-education degrees previous to doctoral studies, and is equivalent to a bachelor's degree and master's degree in the anglophone system. This degree is currently being phased out at Spanish universities, replaced by the 'Grado' and 'Master' system due to the implementation of the Bologna Declaration on the European higher education area.

The Licenciatura academic degree is academically equivalent to the Ingeniero or Arquitecto degrees. A Licenciatura typically required from four to six years of university courses, and had a typical credit workload of 300 to 400 credits. It usually had two or three introductory years (first cycle, after which the candidate could obtain a Diplomatura or Bachelor's degree in that field of studies) and two additional years (second cycle) for specialization (but this could vary from one to three). In addition, there existed a third cycle, comprising PhD degrees (doctorado, which included one or two years of research-oriented courses and the completion of a thesis towards the same doctor diploma). When studying for a Licenciatura, completion of the first cycle did not automatically lead to the award of a diploma. However, students could elect to study specialized three-year degrees from the outset (diplomaturas, and arquitecturas técnicas—technical engineering), which, after successful completion, would give access to the second cycle of a number of Licenciaturas. A Licenciatura degree also provided direct access to professional practice or membership in professional associations such as Bar Associations for lawyers (Colegio de Abogados, until Bar membership requirements were changed to include a minimum amount of legal work experience and passing an exam), medicine, economics, and other regulated professions.

The third cycle was sometimes called postgrado. Note, however, that the label "undergraduate" may be misleading to an anglophone audience, since while a Spanish Diplomatura may be likened to an undergraduate Bachelor's degree, a Spanish Licenciatura is comparable in scope to a postgraduate Master's degree, as the anglophone distinction between "undergraduate" and "postgraduate" degrees does not properly apply to the traditional higher-education system of Spain. Many Spanish licenciados, when translating their CVs into English, use the formula BA+MA (or BSc+MSc) to indicate that a Licenciatura is equivalent to a master's degree. Depending on the degree and study plan, some Spanish universities require a small thesis or research project to be submitted in the last year before the student can finally claim their degree.

The Spanish government issued a royal decree in 2014 establishing the official equivalences between the Spanish pre-Bologna titles and the European Qualifications Framework (EQF) levels. This royal decree also describes the procedure for applying for a personal certificate stating the equivalence of a given pre-Bologna title to the new Bologna levels. Most Licenciaturas (if not all) have been placed in level 7 (Master) of the EQF.

After the Bologna process, all official university degrees will fall into one of these three categories: Grado (Bachelor), Master or Doctor. Most Grados will consist of three or four years (240 ECTS credits), unless it is otherwise ruled by an EU Directive (like Pharmacy, five years, or Medicine, six years). All university students completing these four years will get a Grado and may then go on with Master's studies (one to two years, 60-120 ECTS credits). Doctorate studies will in most cases require a research-oriented master's degree and may or may not include specific courses.

Grados will take one year more than the old Diplomatura or Ingeniería Técnica degrees, and graduates from the old system may have to study additional courses to transform their degree into a Grado. Nevertheless, in most aspects, Grados will be the equivalent of the old intermediate degrees: Grado engineers will have the responsibilities of former Ingenieros técnicos. Lawyers will need a master's degree, not a Grado. And in public service, Grado holders will by default be in the A2 level (the second highest), while A1 (the highest) will be for Grado holders with additional requirements (such as a master's or a doctorate, or a special Grado such as Medicine that is in many aspects equivalent to a master's).

Prior to the Bologna process, the master's degree was not considered an official academic degree in Spain, as the transition from undergraduate to postgraduate studies could only be done directly from a Licenciatura to doctoral studies.

=== Switzerland ===
At Swiss universities, until the adoption of the Bologna Convention, the Lizentiat/licence was the equivalent of a master's degree (there being no prior degrees) and qualified the holder for doctoral studies. The degree names are followed by the field of study (e.g. lic. phil., lic. ès lettres, lic. oec., etc.). In line with the Bologna Process, the degree has now been replaced by master's degrees (with bachelor's degrees being newly introduced).

According to the Swiss University Conference, the joint organization of the cantons and the Confederation for university politics, and the Rectors' Conference of the Swiss Universities, the old Lizentiat/licence is considered equivalent to the current master's degree.

ETH Zurich stated that they consider the Swiss licenciate as equivalent to a master's degree, though they state it is not the same.

=== United Kingdom ===
The licentiate does not make up part of the UK Framework for Higher Education Qualifications. However, the Licentiate in Sacred Theology is offered by Mater Ecclesia College, the Pontifical faculty within St Mary's University, Twickenham.

=== Uruguay ===
In Uruguay, the Licentiate degree (Spanish: Licenciatura) is an undergraduate degree awarded by state-recognized universities and university-level institutes. It represents a full tertiary education programme, typically lasting four years, and generally includes a final dissertation or graduation project. The degree constitutes the standard level of undergraduate academic qualification in the Uruguayan higher education system and grants access to postgraduate studies, such as master’s and doctoral programmes.

=== Venezuela ===
A Licenciatura is awarded to students after five years of study. They are required to write a thesis and/or do an internship and/or develop a research project in order to graduate.

== Theology, canon law, history, and cultural patrimony ==
The pontifical licentiate is the second cycle of ecclesiastical academic degrees conferred by pontifical universities and ecclesiastical faculties under the authority of the Holy See. Positioned between the Baccalaureate and Doctorate, the Licentiate serves both academic and canonical functions within the Roman Catholic Church, preparing graduates for teaching and specialized roles in biblical studies, theology, canon law, and philosophy. The typical duration of coursework for a licentiate degree is three to four years, culminating in the completion of a thesis.

The Licentiate of Sacred Theology (STL) is available from many Pontifical universities and Pontifical faculties of theology, possessing the authority to grant pontifical degrees. This compares with, for example in North American institutions, the four-year program for a B.A. at many universities, a two-year program for an MA, and the writing and successful defense of the doctoral dissertation for the PhD, Th.D., or STD (an additional two to three years).

The degree of Licentiate of Canon Law (JCL) is similarly awarded at Pontifical universities and faculties. Other qualifications for canon law include an inter-denominational LLM program at least one university (Cardiff), though this degree would not have canonical effects in the Roman Catholic Church.

The Faculty of History and the Cultural Patrimony of the Church at the Gregorian University also awards the Licentiate in the History of the Church, and the Licentiate in the Cultural Patrimony of the Church.

== European consolidation: the Bologna Process ==
In 2003, the European Union organized the Bologna Convention for the European Higher Education Area under the Lisbon Recognition Convention, more commonly known as the Bologna Process, in order to create uniform standards across the European Union in university education. The resulting conclusions called for all European universities to change their degree programs to a bachelor's degree and a master's degree.

== See also ==
- All but dissertation
- Associate degree
- Bachelor's degree
- Doctor of Philosophy
- Graduate degree
- Master's degree
- Undergraduate degree
