= Licentiate of Canon Law =

Title in the Roman Catholic Church

Licentiate of Canon Law (Latin: Juris Canonici Licentiatus; JCL) is the title of an advanced graduate degree with canonical effects in the Roman Catholic Church offered by pontifical universities and ecclesiastical faculties of canon law. Licentiate is the title of a person who holds an academic degree called a licence. The licentiate of canon law is the ordinary way for forming future canonists, according to Veritatis gaudium.

== Academic program ==
Licentiate programs in canon law involve a study of the whole corpus of canon law in the Roman Catholic Church, understood in terms of its theological, philosophical, and historical background, and the method and practice of scholarly scientific research. Consequently, experts in canon law have a comprehensive understanding of the nature of law specifically in the life of the church.

=== First cycle ===
The usual prerequisites for a licence in canon law are that a candidate must have the Bachelor of Sacred Theology degree (STB), Master of Divinity degree (M.Div.), Master of Arts (MA) degree in Roman Catholic theology, or Juris Doctor (JD) degree and a bachelor's degree in canon law (JCB) or its relative equivalent. Candidates with a heavy concentration of theological and philosophical coursework during undergraduate studies may be exempted from further academic prerequisites.

=== Second cycle ===
In order for a candidate to obtain the licentiate of canon law, he or she must complete a six-semester (two years year-round, three years with summer break), program of canonical studies, pass a comprehensive oral examination before a jury of faculty members, and write a thesis on a particular theme that demonstrates the student's ability to function professionally in the field.

== Uses of the degree in the Catholic Church ==
The licence in canon law is required for a person to teach canon law in a pontifical university or Catholic seminary. The licence is also the prerequisite to the doctorate in the same field (JCD). Furthermore, the degree is a prerequisite for several officers of Catholic ecclesiastical courts: judges (including the judicial vicar), the Promoter of Justice, and the Defender of the Bond all must at least possess this degree.

== Pontifical faculties ==
Notable faculties which offer the licence in canon law include: the Pontifical Lateran University (Lateranum, also known as "The Pope's University"), the Pontifical University of St. Thomas Aquinas (Angelicum); the Pontifical Gregorian University (Gregorianum), the Pontifical University of the Holy Cross (Santa Croce), the Pontifical Urban University (Urbanianum), the University of Navarra in Pamplona, the Catholic University of America, Saint Paul University in Canada, the Pontifical and Royal University of Santo Tomas in Manila, Philippines, the Katholieke Universiteit Leuven in Belgium, the Institut Catholique de Paris, LMU Munich, the Westfälische Wilhelms-Universität Münster in Germany, and the Faculty of Canon Law "S. Pio X" in Venice of Studium Generale Marcianum.

== See also ==
- Doctor of both laws
