= Licentiate in Sacred Scripture =

Ecclesiastical second-cycle degree in Biblical Studies

Licentiate in Sacred Scripture (SSL; Latin: Licentia in Sacra Scriptura) is a canonical second-cycle academic degree in Biblical Studies conferred by pontifical faculties, most notably the Pontifical Biblical Institute. Within the system of Catholic ecclesiastical studies the licentiate is the intermediate degree between the baccalaureate and the doctorate, and it has canonical effects in the Catholic Church, particularly for teaching in seminaries and ecclesiastical faculties.

== History ==
The origins of the SSL are closely tied to the founding (1909) and early development of the Pontifical Biblical Institute (Pontificium Institutum Biblicum). Initially, the Institute prepared students to sit examinations administered by the Pontifical Biblical Commission. In 1916, Pope Benedict XV, by the apostolic letter Cum Biblia sacra, authorized the Institute to grant the academic degree of licence in the name of the Biblical Commission. In 1928, Pius XI’s motu proprio Quod maxime granted the Institute academic independence from the Commission and the right to confer the doctorate.

More broadly, the framework for ecclesiastical degrees was first comprehensively codified in the apostolic constitution Sapientia christiana (1979) and updated by Veritatis gaudium (2017/2018), which together regulate ecclesiastical universities and faculties and identify the three cycles of baccalaureate, licentiate, and doctorate.

== Academic profile ==
The SSL is a specialized degree in the field of Sacred Scripture. As a licentiate (second cycle), it normally requires prior completion of first-cycle ecclesiastical studies (e.g., the S.T.B.) or an equivalent preparation and consists of approximately two to three years (four to six semesters) of advanced, research-oriented study, including seminars and a thesis or major written work appropriate to the faculty’s statutes.

At the Pontifical Biblical Institute (Rome and Jerusalem campuses), the licentiate curriculum combines intensive exegesis of the biblical text with complementary specialization tracks (e.g., biblical context; hermeneutics and history of interpretation), along with language competency and, where applicable, on-site archaeological and geographical study in the Holy Land. Other pontifical institutions with biblical faculties likewise structure the licentiate as a two-year, thesis-bearing program preparing graduates for teaching, doctoral research, and scholarly service in the Church.

== Canonical status and rights ==
Canonical licentiates, including the SSL, are conferred by faculties canonically erected or approved by the Holy See and have canonical effects. Veritatis gaudium affirms that the licentiate constitutes the second cycle and is ordinarily required for admission to the doctorate; it also serves as a canonical qualification for teaching in seminaries and ecclesiastical faculties according to the norms of the Congregation for Catholic Education and the Statutes of each faculty.

== Licentiate in Biblical Theology ==
A closely related degree is the Licentiate in Biblical Theology (often abbreviated as S.T.L. with specialization in Biblical Studies along with Theology), offered by several pontifical and ecclesiastical faculties. Programs typically provide an organic and specialized synthesis of Sacred Scripture and biblical theology, initiate students into research tools, and culminate in a thesis. Examples include offerings at the Pontifical Gregorian University, the Catholic University of America and Dharmaram Vidya Kshetram.

== Institutions ==
- Pontifical Biblical Institute (Rome; Jerusalem campus) — Biblical Faculty confers SSL and Doctorate in Sacred Scripture.
- Other pontifical universities and affiliated/aggregated institutions with theological faculties may offer second-cycle licentiate programs with biblical specialization leading to the S.T.L. in Biblical Theology.

== See also ==
- Licentiate of Sacred Theology (S.T.L.)
- Doctor of Sacred Scripture (S.S.D.)
- Pontifical University

== Notes ==
Degree titles and exact program structures vary by faculty; some institutions style the program “Licentiate in Sacred Scripture (SSL)” within a Biblical Faculty, while others award an S.T.L. with specialization in Biblical Theology within a Theological Faculty.
