= Pontifical universities in Rome =

Catholic universities

A pontifical university or athenaeum is a Catholic university established by and directly under the authority of the Holy See. It is licensed to grant academic degrees in sacred faculties, the most important of which are theology, canon law, and philosophy. Pontifical universities follow a European system of degrees in the sacred faculties, granting the baccalaureate, the licentiate, and the doctorate.

As defined by the 1983 Code of Canon Law:

Can. 814 The prescripts established for universities apply equally to other institutes of higher learning.

Can. 815 Ecclesiastical universities or faculties, which are to investigate the sacred disciplines or those connected to the sacred and to instruct students scientifically in the same disciplines, are proper to the Church by virtue of its function to announce the revealed truth.

Can. 816 §1. Ecclesiastical universities and faculties can be established only through erection by the Apostolic See or with its approval; their higher direction also pertains to it.

§2. Individual ecclesiastical universities and faculties must have their own statutes and plan of studies approved by the Apostolic See.

Can. 817 No university or faculty which has not been erected or approved by the Apostolic See is able to confer academic degrees which have canonical effects in the Church.

Independent institutions or individual faculties at non-pontifical universities may also be given charters by the Holy See (under canon 814) to grant pontifical degrees, usually in one or two specific fields. These are referred to as a "pontifical faculty," "pontifical institute," or "pontifical athenaeo" to distinguish them from an entire "pontifical university," which incorporates at least four faculties, including theology, canon law, and philosophy.

The vicariate (diocese) of Rome has established an office for campus ministry and the pastoral care of students, the Office of Pastorale Universitaria. This office serves students at the pontifical universities as well as those enrolled at state universities.

== Academic degrees ==
Pontifical universities divide studies into 3 cycles: the first cycle of varying duration, after which is obtained a Bachelor (Baccalaureato), the second cycle, which leads to the conferment of a License degree (Licenza), and finally the third cycle, which grant a Graduate degree (Dottorato). The duration of courses varies from university to university.

In Italy "degrees in Sacred Theology and other specific ecclesiastical disciplines (Sacred Scriptures, Canon Law, Spirituality, Sacred Liturgy, Missiology, and Religious Sciences), conferred by a Faculty approved by the Holy See are recognized by the State" pursuant to art. 10/II of the 25 March 1985 n.21 Law (OJ No 28, April 10, 1985). However, no measures were taken to establish a priori the equivalence with the titles conferred by Italian universities. It is therefore not possible to predetermine a mandatory equivalence for qualifications issued by pontifical universities with those issued by state universities. Indeed, in Italy, constant changes make it very complex to unify a university curriculum with the problem of equality that must be resolved, at their request, from time to time by the relevant Ministry of Education, University and Research.

== Courses ==
Generally, Pontifical universities are composed of the three traditional ecclesiastical faculties of Theology, Philosophy, and Canon Law. Additionally, they might include the ecclesiastical faculties of Sacred Scriptures, Sacred Liturgy, Spirituality, Missiology, and Religious Sciences. However, after approval from the Holy See, faculties for other ecclesiastical and non-ecclesiastical degrees have also been formed in Pontifical institutions. The Apostolic Constitution Veritatis Gaudium (in its Appendix II) lists the following: Christian Archeology, Bioethics, Social communications, Civil Law (and Utriusque iuris), Christian and Classical Letters, Holistic Ecology Studies, Judaic Studies and Jewish-Christian Relations, Sacred Music, Ancient Near Eastern Studies, Psychology, Educational Sciences, Social Sciences (which include the Social Doctrine of the Church), Church History (which includes the Cultural Heritage of the Church), Arab and Islamic Studies, Oriental Studies, Studies on Marriage and Family, and Studies in Peace Sciences. Although not included in the list, the studies of Patristic Sciences should be mentioned as well, since the Augustinian Patristic Institute was specifically founded for the study of both Western Patristics (Theology of the Church Fathers) and Western Patrology (Lives and Writings of Church Fathers), while its Eastern counterparts are studied at the Pontifical Oriental Institute.

== Pontifical institutions in Rome ==
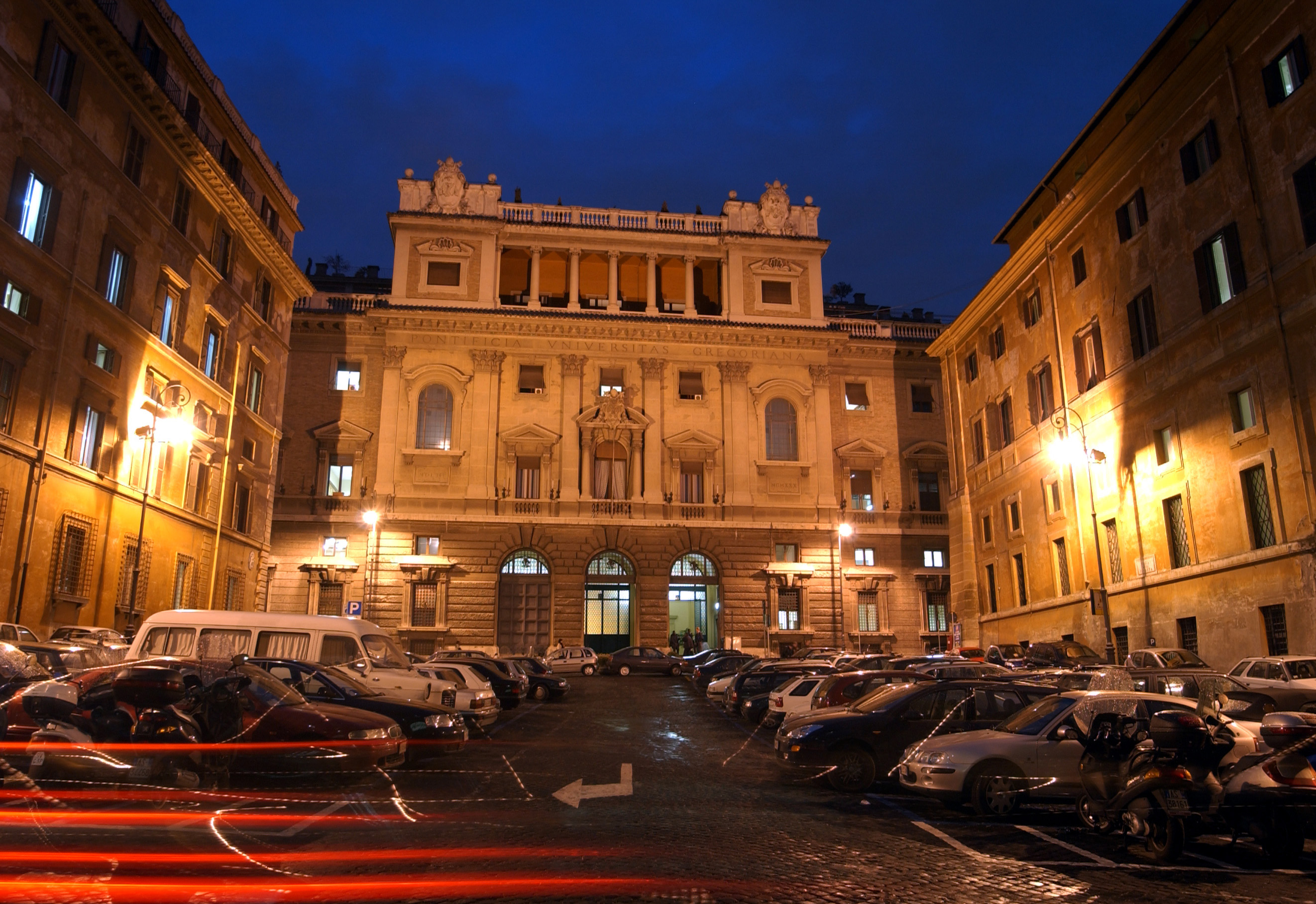
The Pontifical Gregorian University.

Rome has twenty-two pontifical institutions. They are organized as pontifical universities (with respect to can. 815), and pontifical athenaea, institutes of higher education, and faculties (these with respect to can. 814). (The Religious Order or other ecclesiastical body responsible for the administration of the university is listed in parentheses.)

=== Pontifical universities (can. 815) ===
- Pontifical Gregorian University "Gregoriana" (Jesuits)
- Pontifical Lateran University "Lateranum" (Diocese of Rome)
- Pontifical Salesian University "Salesianum" (Salesian Fathers)
- Pontifical University of the Holy Cross "Santa Croce" (Opus Dei)
- Pontifical University of St. Anthony "Antonianum" (Franciscans)
- Pontifical University of St. Thomas Aquinas "Angelicum" (Dominicans)
- Pontifical Urban University "Urbaniana" (Dicastery for Evangelization)

=== Pontifical athenaea (can. 814) ===
- Pontifical Athenaeum "Regina Apostolorum" (Legionaries of Christ)
- Pontifical Athenaeum of St. Anselm "Anselmianum" (Benedictines)

=== Pontifical faculties (can. 814) ===
- Pontifical Faculty of Education "Auxilium" (Salesian Sisters)
- Pontifical Faculty of Theology and Institute of Spirituality "Teresianum" (Discalced Carmelites)
- Pontifical Theological Faculty "Marianum" (Servites)
- Pontifical Theological Faculty of St. Bonaventure "Seraphicum" (Conventual Franciscans)

=== Pontifical institutes (can. 814) ===
- Pontifical Institute "John Paul II" for Marriage and Family Sciences
- Pontifical Institute of Arab and Islamic Studies "PISAI" (White Fathers)
- Pontifical Institute for Christian Archaeology "PIAC"
- Pontifical Institute of Sacred Music "PIMS"
- Pontifical Institute of Ambrosian Sacred Music "PIAMS" at Milan [outside of Rome, but associated to PIMS]

=== Pontifical institutions incorporated or associated to others (can. 814) ===
- Pontifical Institute for Biblical Studies "Biblicum" (Jesuits) [associated to Gregoriana]
- Pontifical Institute for Eastern Studies "Orientale" (Jesuits) [associated to Gregoriana]
- Pontifical Institute for Patristic Sciences "Augustinianum" (Augustines) [incorporated into Lateranum]
- Pontifical Institute of Theology of Consecrated Life "Claretianum" (Claretians) [incorporated into Lateranum]
- Pontifical Institute of Moral Theology "Accademia Alfonsiana" (Redemptorists) [incorporated into Lateranum]

=== Others ===
Four historical Pontifical Institutions in Rome have been incorporated into larger Pontifical Universities becoming discipline-specific faculties:

- Pontifical Institute for Pastoral Ministry "Redemptor Hominis" [Serves as Faculty of Pastoral Theology at Lateranum]
- Pontifical Institute of Latinitas [Serves as Faculty of Christian and Classical Literature at Salesianum]
- Pontifical Institute of Sacred Liturgy [Serves as Faculty of Sacred Liturgy at Anselmianum]
- Pontifical Institute of Utriusque Iuris [Comprising the Faculties of Canon Law and Civil Law at Lateranum]

Some Roman Pontifical Institutions are associated with other institutions in Jerusalem:

- Pontificium Institutum Biblicum [incorporated into Biblicum]
- Studium Biblicum Franciscanum [incorporated into Antonianum]
- Studium Theologicum Salesianum [incorporated into Salesianum]

For completeness of information, a pontifical institute of higher learning, the Pontifical Ecclesiastical Academy in Rome, takes care of the preparation of the priest for the service diplomacy of the Holy See of various nunciatures or in Secretary of State of the Holy See.
