= Ecclesiastical privilege (disambiguation) =

Ecclesiastical privilege may refer to:

- One of the Ecclesiastical Privileges of the Canon law of the Catholic Church
- Priest–penitent privilege
- Ecclesiastical privilege (Jehovah's Witnesses), a privilege enjoyed by the appointed elders of Jehovah's Witnesses in lieu of a special class of clergy
