= Licentiate of Sacred Theology =

Catholic ecclesiastical degree

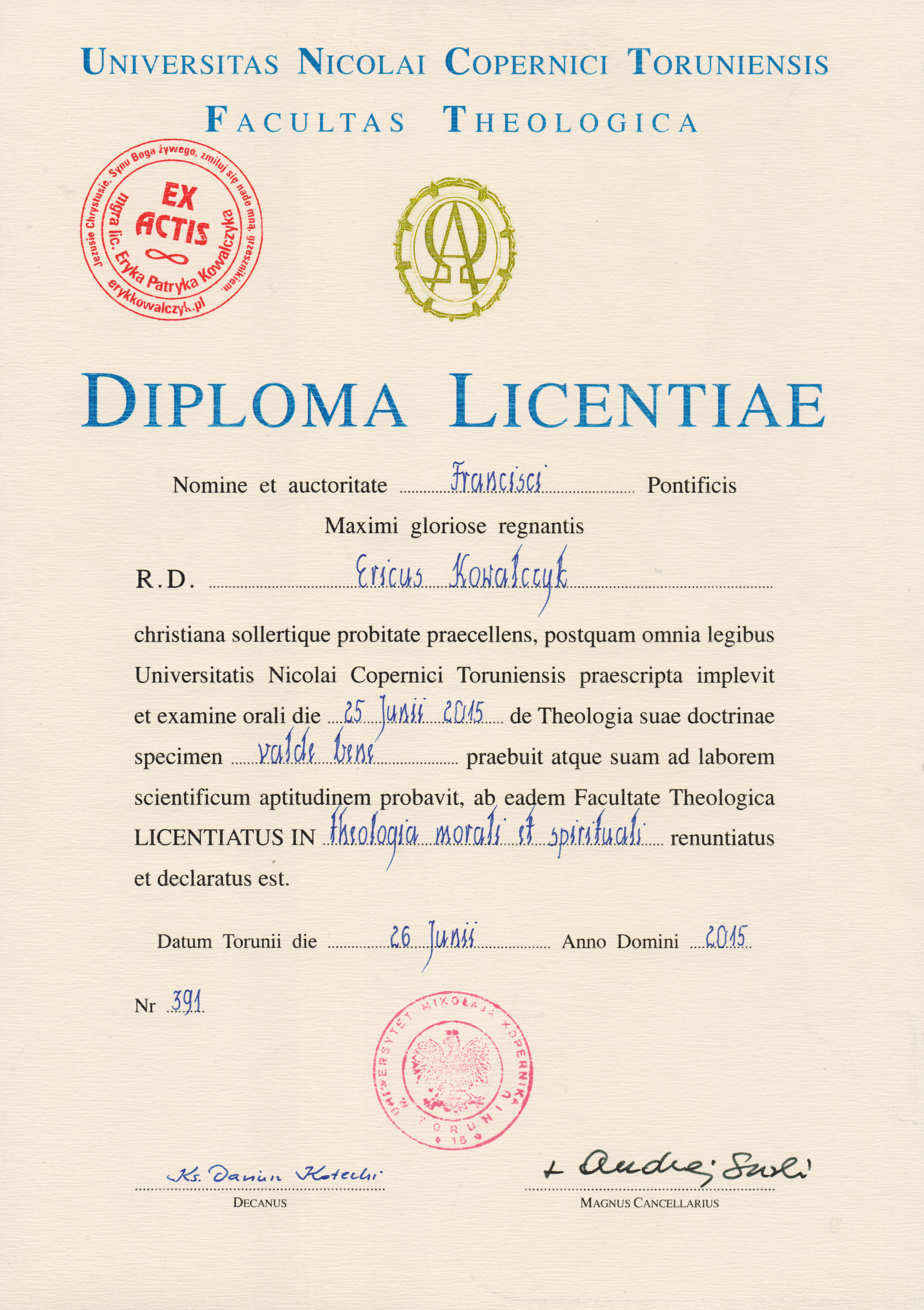
Canonical degree in theology of a Polish university

Licentiate in Sacred Theology (Latin: Licentia in Sacra Theologia; abbreviated LTh or STL) is the second of three canonical degrees in theology (the first being the Baccalaureate in Sacred Theology and the third being the Doctorate in Sacred Theology) which are conferred by a number of pontifical faculties around the world. In the civil system, the licentiate would be considered similar to the coursework and exams of a Doctor of Philosophy program. The licentiate degree comes with attendant canonical effects in the Catholic Church, specifically granting the holder the right to teach in Catholic seminaries and schools of theology.

== Description ==
The program for a licentiate degree is equivalent to a total of two years or four semesters of full-time study after receiving a university degree and the Bachelor of Sacred Theology degree [STB] (SapC 72b). The STB, or first cycle, requires five years or ten semesters (SapC 72a). "In this cycle the special disciplines are taught corresponding to the nature of the diverse specializations being undertaken. Also seminars and practical exercises are conducted for the acquisition of the ability to do scientific research." (SapC 72b) The licentiate program develops research skills and treats theological questions in greater depth.

Students may pursue the license as either a transitional or a terminal degree. As a transitional degree, the STL program introduces students to a more scientific study of theology in pursuing Doctoral studies. "Nobody can be admitted to the doctorate unless first having obtained the licentiate" (SapC 49.2). As a terminal degree, the license prepares students to be teachers and resource persons.

A graduate of the STL program is prepared to teach theology in a college, seminary, or university, to function as a chaplain to various professional groups, and to act as a theological resource for a diocese and diocesan agencies. "The doctorate is the academic degree which enables one to teach in a Faculty and which is therefore required for this purpose, the licentiate is the academic degree which enables one to teach in a major seminary or equivalent school and which is therefore required for this purpose" (SapC 50.1). In several European countries, the master level degree is referred to as a license – from its original meaning as a "license to incept", i.e., that is, permission from the local bishop to actually take the degree of master or doctor, an event which took place through the ceremony of inception.

The usual prerequisites for entering the Licentiate of Sacred Theology are that a candidate must have the Baccalaureate in Sacred Theology (STB) or equivalent, typically the Master of Divinity (M.Div.). In order for a candidate to receive a license in sacred theology, he or she must engage in a two-year program of theological studies and propose an original thesis which contributes to the understanding of sacred theology.

The license in sacred theology is required for a person to teach sacred theology in a pontifical university (SapC 17) or major seminary (SapC 50.1). The license is also the prerequisite for the doctorate (STD) (SapC 49.2).

The Licentiate in Sacred Scripture (SSL) is a similar degree in the field of biblical studies.
