= Pastorale Universitaria =

Roman Catholic office of the Cardinal Vicar

The Pastorale Universitaria is an office of the Cardinal Vicar (Vicar General of the Diocese of Rome) responsible for the pastoral care of students at the Pontifical universities and Pontifical academies of Rome.

The office is responsible for raising funds for special pastoral care projects and performing various student assistance functions. The current Director of the Office is Monsignor Lorenzo Leuzzi.

The office provides chaplaincy functions in line with the guidelines drafted by the European Committee of University Chaplains particularly at the Symposium on the Church and the University in Europe, which took place in July 2003.
