= Privilegium fori =

Court specialized by social group

The privilegium fori (Latin for "privilege of the (legal) forum") is a generic term for legal privileges to be tried in a particular court or type of court of law. Typically, it is an application of the principle of trial by one's peers, either by such a jury or at least by a specific court from that social segment, such as a soldier by a court martial, a cleric by an ecclesiastical court.

== Canon law ==
Privilegium fori used to be one of the ecclesiastical privileges in the canon law of the Catholic Church: a member of the clergy received a special tribunal in civil and criminal causes before an ecclesiastical judge. This privilege was based on provisions in Roman law, which worked their way into church law and received preliminary codification in Gratian's Decretum, though later popes continued to adjust the terms of the privilege.

== See also ==
- Venetian Interdict
