= Ecclesiastical privileges =

In the canon law of the Catholic Church, ecclesiastical privileges are the privileges enjoyed by the clergy. Their scope varied over time.

The main privileges are:

- Privilegium canonis, regarding personal inviolability against malicious injury
- Privilegium fori, regarding a special tribunal in civil and criminal causes before an ecclesiastical judge.
- Privilegium immunitatis, exemption from taxation and some other burdens
- Privilegium competentiae, right to proper sustenance

In addition to personal privileges, ecclesiastical privileges may cover consecrated and sacred places and things.
