= Pontifical University of St. Bonaventure =

Coordinates: 41°49′46″N 012°28′57″E

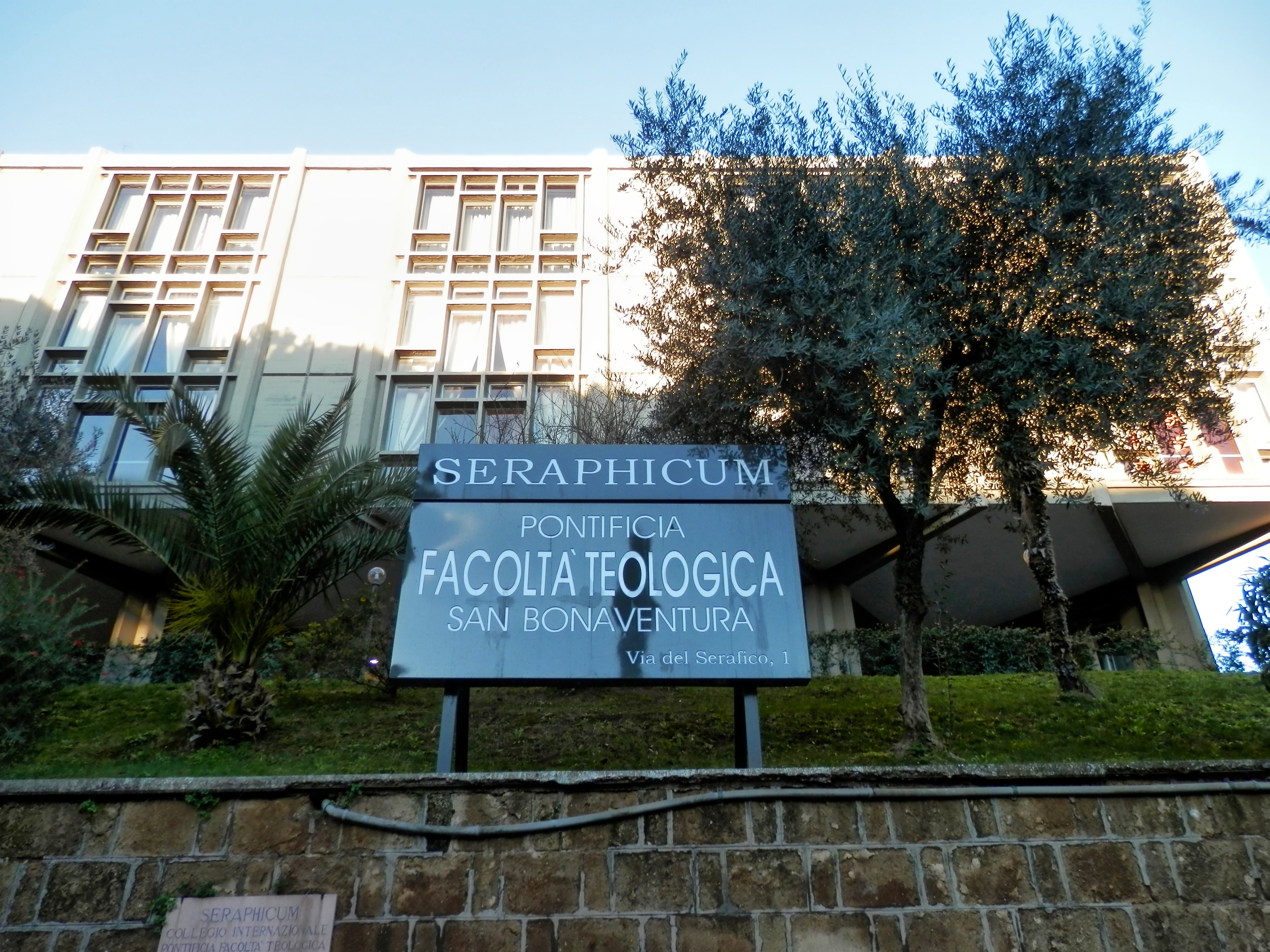
University of Saint Bonaventure – Seraphicum

Location on a map of Rome

The Pontifical University of St. Bonaventure or Pontifical Theological Faculty of Saint Bonaventure (Italian: Pontificia facoltà teologica San Bonaventura, Latin: Pontificia Facultas Theologica S. Bonaventurae), commonly called the Seraphicum, is the international study center of the Friars Minor Conventual in Rome. As a Pontifical faculty, the Seraphicum is governed by the Holy See according to the Apostolic Constitution Sapientia christiana.

== History ==
The College of Saint Bonaventure was founded in Rome in 1587, by the Franciscan Pope Sixtus V, in order to provide for the advanced study of theology by members of the Conventual branch of the Franciscan Order. Originally located within the General Curia of the Order, the college was attached to the Basilica of the Holy Apostles. The college became an international graduate school of theology in 1894, when it was moved to Via San Teodoro, in the Velabrum valley at the foot of the Palatine Hill, within the Rione of Ripa.

The college was moved again in 1964 to its current location on the Via del Serafico, just off the Via Laurentina and near the popular Sanctuary of Our Lady of the Revelation. In 1986 it was visited by Pope John Paul II. In the same year (December 1986) the new, current statutes of Seraphicum were approved. Among the well-known professors and students of Seraphicum there were: St Maximilian Kolbe, author, professor and missionary; fr. Leone Veuthey, servant of God and great theologian.

On March 1, 2007, the Theological Faculty of the Seraphicum organized and hosted a national conference on the dialogue between Freemasonry and the Roman Catholic Church, an event that revamped the relationships within the two religious communions.

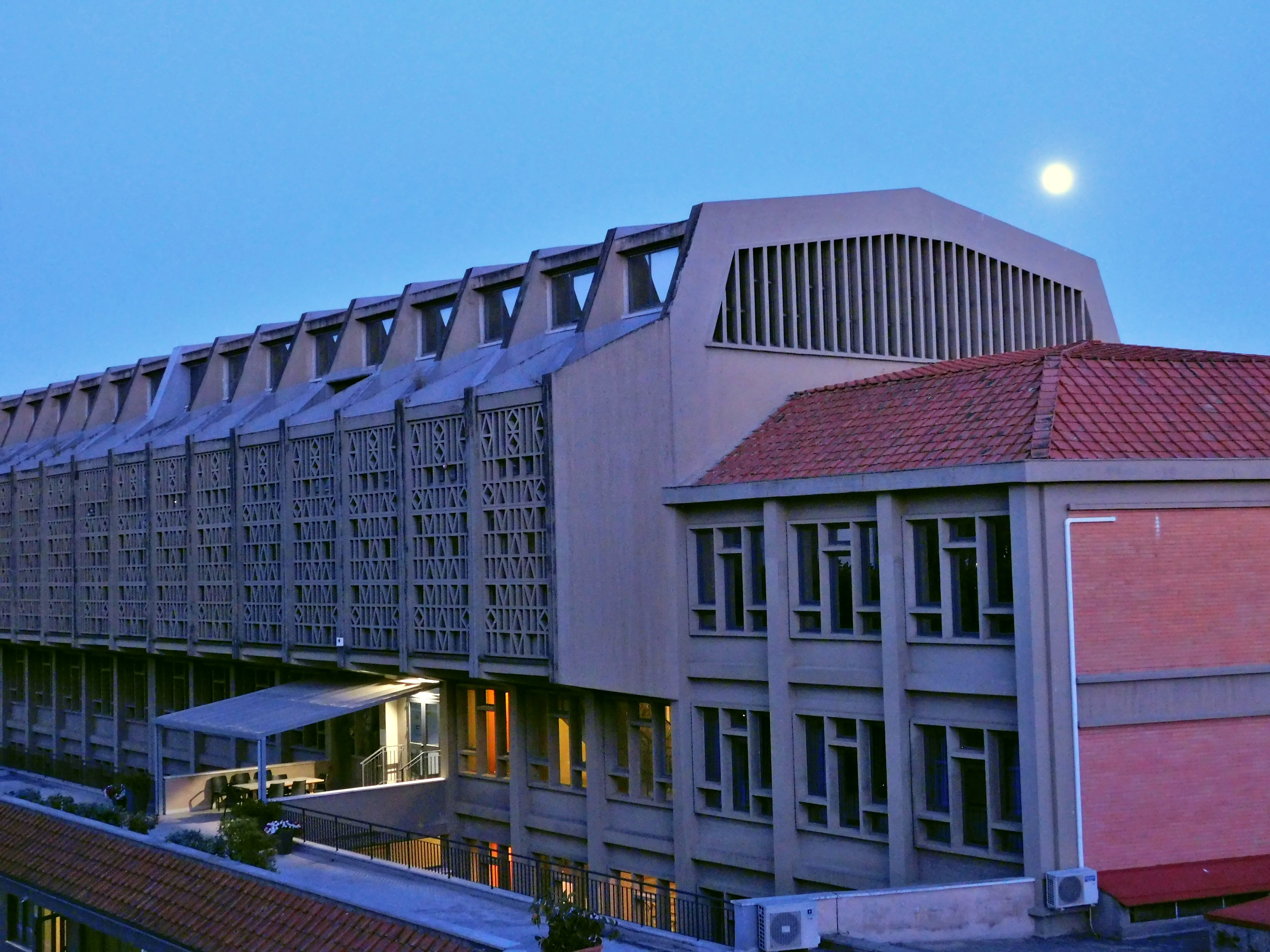
Library of Seraphicum - external view (at dusk)

== Divisions ==
The university is composed of two separate facilities.

=== Friary ===
The Friary of Saint Bonaventure refers to the community of Conventual Franciscan friars who teach in the Theological Faculty of Saint Bonaventure or some other Pontifical institute in the city. It also houses friars who serve the Roman Catholic Church at the Vatican and the various offices of the Church around the city.

=== School of Theology ===
The Theological Faculty educates those friars of the Order who are sent to Rome from provinces throughout the world in order to complete the canonical course of philosophical and theological studies, usually in preparation for being ordained priests.
