= Licentiate (canonical degree) =

Post-graduate academic degree in Theology and Philosophy with canonical right to lecture

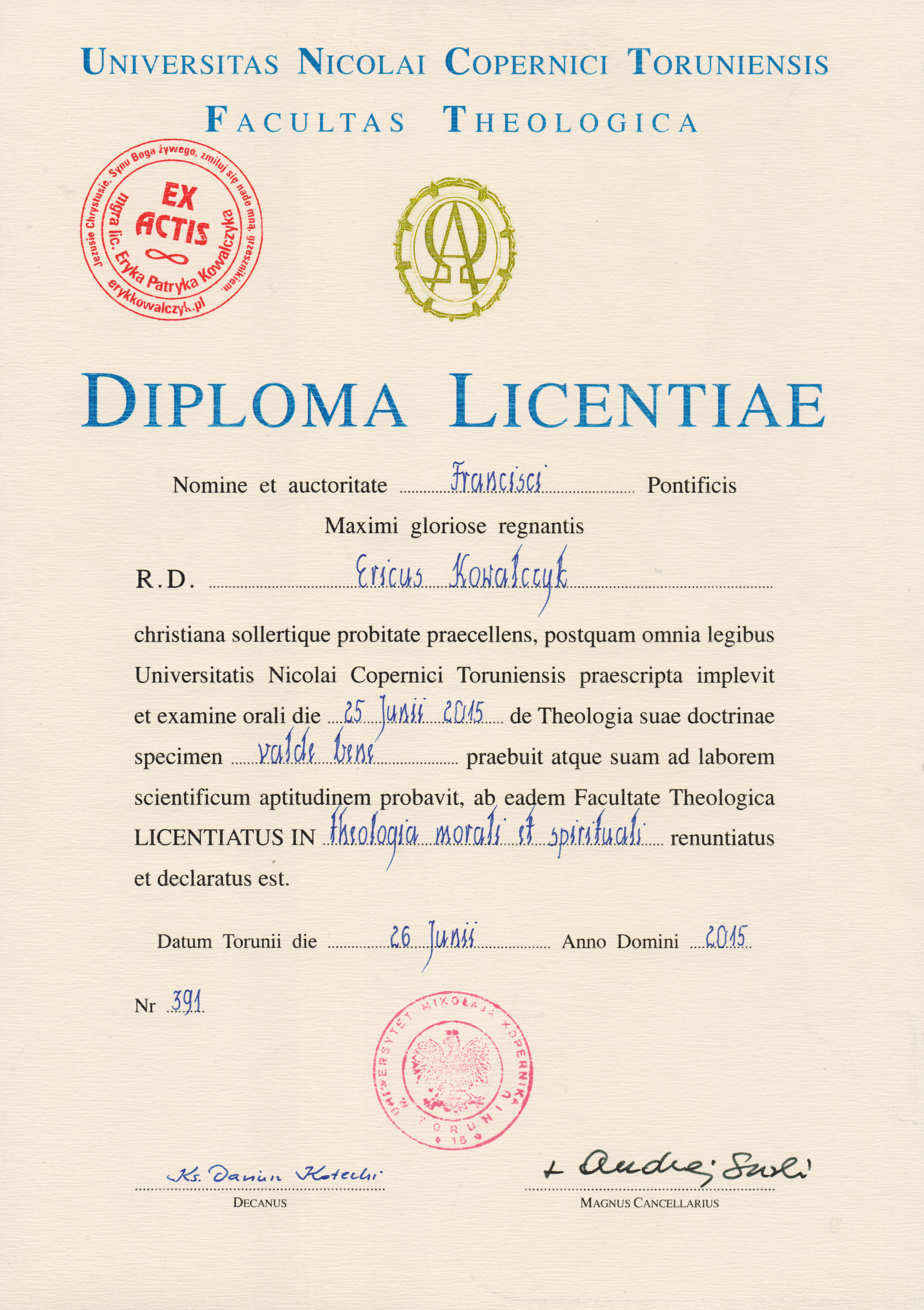
Licentiate of Moral Theology given by a Polish university

Licentiate is the second cycle of ecclesiastical academic degrees conferred by pontifical universities and ecclesiastical faculties under the authority of the Holy See. Positioned between the ecclesiastical Baccalaureate and Doctorate, the Licentiate serves both academic and canonical functions within the Roman Catholic and Eastern Churches, preparing graduates for teaching and specialized roles in biblical studies, theology, canon law, and philosophy. The typical duration of coursework for a licentiate degree is three to four years, culminating in the completion of a thesis. In the civil system, the licentiate would be considered similar to the coursework and exams of a Doctor of Philosophy program.

== Historical and canonical foundation ==
The term licentiate originates from the Latin licentia docendi, meaning "permission to teach." Historically, it signified the Catholic or Orthodox Church’s authorization for a scholar to teach theology or canon law in ecclesiastical institutions. Today, the Licentiate grants the right to teach in Catholic seminaries and pontifical faculties and qualifies holders for specific ecclesiastical offices. The structure and requirements of ecclesiastical degrees are governed by the Apostolic Constitutions Sapientia Christiana (1979) and Veritatis Gaudium (2018). The 1983 Code of Canon Law mandates that certain roles, such as bishops (canon 378 §1) or judges in ecclesiastical tribunals (canon 1421 §3), require at least a Licentiate in sacred scripture, theology, or canon law from an institute approved by the Holy See.

== Licentiate of Sacred Scripture (S.S.L.) ==
The Licentiate of Sacred Scripture (S.S.L.), also known as Licentiate in Biblical Theology (B.T.L.), is an academic degree offered by institutions specialised in Sacred Scriptures like the Pontifical Biblical Institute, Gregorian University, Dharmaram Vidya Kshetram, KU Leuven, UCLouvain etc. The degree spans three to four years and focuses on biblical studies. It includes rigorous coursework in biblical languages, exegesis, and theology, preparing graduates for advanced research or teaching roles. Requirements include proficiency in Latin, Greek, and Hebrew, coursework in exegesis and theology, and a licentiate thesis demonstrating scholarly competence. Those who enrol for the LSS typically hold a five-year Baccalaureate in Sacred Theology (S.T.B.) degree or an equivalent qualification.

== Licentiate of Sacred Theology (S.T.L.) ==
The Licentiate of Sacred Theology (S.T.L.) follows the Baccalaureate in Sacred Theology (S.T.B.) and typically requires two to three years of full-time study. It emphasizes specialized theological disciplines, seminars, and research proficiency, preparing graduates for teaching in pontifical universities or pursuing the Doctorate in Sacred Theology (S.T.D.). Requirements include advanced coursework in exegesis, a licentiate thesis, a comprehensive examination based on a prescribed booklist, and proficiency in Latin, Greek (six credits beyond intermediate level), Hebrew (six credits beyond introductory level), and a modern research language (e.g., French or German).

== Licentiate in Philosophy (Ph.L.) ==
The Licentiate in Philosophy (Ph.L.) is an advanced academic degree conferred by pontifical universities and ecclesiastical faculties recognized by the Holy See, particularly those focused on preparing candidates for the priesthood, academic teaching, or scholarly research in the Catholic intellectual tradition. Positioned between the baccalaureate in philosophy and the doctorate in philosophy, the Licentiate typically requires completion of at least two years of prior philosophical study, normally with a bachelor's degree in philosophy (B.Ph. or equivalent) from a recognized ecclesiastical faculty. Admission generally demands proficiency in Latin and at least one modern scholarly language such as French, German, or Italian. The Ph.L. curriculum emphasizes systematic philosophy, history of philosophy, logic, ethics, and metaphysics, culminating in the submission and defense of a licentiate thesis.

Notable institutions offering the degree include the Pontifical Gregorian University, Pontifical Lateran University, and the Pontifical University of Saint Thomas Aquinas in Rome; the Catholic University of America; KU Leuven and UCLouvain in Belgium and Dharmaram Vidya Kshetram in India. The degree is a canonical requirement for teaching philosophy in Catholic seminaries and higher ecclesiastical institutions.

== Licentiate in Moral Theology (M.T.L.) ==
The Licentiate in Moral Theology is a postgraduate ecclesiastical degree conferred by pontifical universities and faculties, emphasizing advanced study and scholarly research in moral theology within the Catholic tradition.

The degree builds upon foundational theological training, typically requiring a Bachelor of Sacred Theology (STB) or an equivalent degree such as a Master of Divinity (M.Div.) as a prerequisite. The program usually spans two years of full-time study and includes advanced coursework in areas such as ethical theory, Catholic social teaching, bioethics, moral philosophy, and theological anthropology. In addition to formal classes, the curriculum incorporates seminars, guided readings, and practical applications of moral reasoning in both ecclesial and contemporary contexts.

A key requirement of the licentiate is the completion of a research thesis, which must demonstrate original scholarly work and critical engagement with contemporary moral issues such as medical ethics, social justice, sexuality, and environmental stewardship.

The Licentiate in Moral Theology qualifies graduates to teach theology, particularly moral theology, in Catholic seminaries, pontifical universities, and other accredited theological institutions. It also prepares individuals to advise bishops, church leaders, and Catholic organizations on complex ethical matters, and contributes to Catholic engagement in public moral discourse.

The degree is especially relevant for those pursuing ecclesiastical careers, such as seminary formators, diocesan ethicists, and members of theological commissions, and may also serve as a stepping stone toward the Doctor of Sacred Theology (STD).

== Licentiate of Canon Law (J.C.L.) ==
The Licentiate of Canon Law (J.C.L.) focuses on the Church’s legal system, requiring approximately three years of study. The curriculum covers the Code of Canon Law, its theological and philosophical foundations, and research methodologies. Graduates are prepared for roles such as judges in ecclesiastical courts, judicial vicars, or diocesan chancellors. Requirements include coursework in canonical studies, a licentiate thesis demonstrating professional competence, a comprehensive oral examination, and proficiency in Latin and other languages as required by the institution.

== Licentiate in Oriental Canon Law (J.C.O.L.) ==
The Licentiate in Oriental Canon Law (J.C.O.L.) focuses on the legal traditions of the Eastern Catholic Churches, based on the Codex Canonum Ecclesiarum Orientalium. Typically spanning three years, it prepares students for specialized roles within Eastern Catholic legal frameworks. Requirements include three years of study, proficiency in Latin and Italian, and a licentiate thesis on a topic related to Eastern Canon Law.

== Academic structure and requirements ==
Pontifical degrees follow a three-cycle system:

- First Cycle: Baccalaureate (e.g., S.T.B.)—typically five years.
- Second Cycle: Licentiate (e.g., S.T.L., J.C.L.)—typically three years.
- Third Cycle: Doctorate (e.g., S.T.D., J.C.D.)—advanced research culminating in a dissertation.

Admission to Licentiate programs requires completion of the first cycle and proficiency in relevant languages, such as Latin. Programs often include coursework, a thesis, comprehensive examinations, and practical components like internships.

== Canonical and ecclesiastical significance ==
The Licentiate degree carries significant canonical implications: Teaching Authority: Authorizes teaching in pontifical universities and major seminaries.

Ecclesiastical Roles: Qualifies holders for roles in ecclesiastical tribunals, diocesan administration, and other specialized positions.

Prerequisite for Doctorate: Required for admission to doctoral programs in sacred disciplines.

These degrees ensure that individuals possess the theological and juridical expertise necessary for leadership and governance in the Church.

== Institutions offering licentiate degrees ==
Pontifical universities and ecclesiastical faculties conferring Licentiate degrees include:

- Catholic University of America: Offers in Philosophy, Biblical Studies and Theology.
- Boston College: Licentiate in Sacred Theology
- Pontifical Athenaeum Dharmaram Vidya Kshetram (Bangalore): Focuses on Biblical Theology and Eastern traditions.
- KU Leuven: Offers in Philosophy, Biblical Studies and Theology
- UCLouvain: Offers in S.T.L, Ph.L.
- Pontifical Gregorian University (Rome): Offers S.T.L., S.S.L., and Biblical Theology programs.
- Pontifical Lateran University (Rome): Known for J.C.L. and S.T.L. programs.
- Pontifical University of Saint Thomas Aquinas (Angelicum) (Rome): Specializes in theology and canon law.
- Pontifical Oriental Institute (Rome): Specializes in J.C.O.L.
