= Pontifical university and athenaeum =

University established or approved by the Roman Catholic Church

A pontifical university or athenaeum is a highly distinguished and authoritative ecclesiastical university of the highest standing, established or approved directly by the Holy See. It is traditionally composed of three principal ecclesiastical faculties (Theology, Philosophy and Canon Law) and one other faculty. According to the apostolic constitution Veritatis gaudium, an institution with four ecclesiastical faculties is canonically erected as an Pontifical University, while one with three ecclesiastical faculties is erected as an Pontifical Athenaeum. These academic institutes deal specifically with Christian philosophy and related disciplines, and the Church's mission of spreading the Gospel, as proclaimed in the apostolic constitution Sapientia christiana. As of 2018, they are governed by the apostolic constitution Veritatis gaudium issued by Pope Francis on 8 December 2017.

== Academic structure ==
Pontifical universities follows European system of study hour calculation, granting the baccalaureate, the licentiate, and the doctorate degrees. These ecclesiastical degrees are prerequisites to certain offices in the Catholic Church, especially considering that bishop candidates are selected mainly from priests who are doctors of sacred theology (S.T.D.) or canon law (J.C.D.) and that ecclesiastical judges and canon lawyers must have at least the Licentiate of Canon Law (J.C.L.).

In 2003, the Holy See took part in the Bologna Process, a series of meetings and agreements between European states designed to foster comparable quality standards in higher education, and in the "Bologna Follow-up Group". Pope Benedict XVI established the Holy See's Agency for the Evaluation and Promotion of Quality in Ecclesiastical Universities and Faculties (Agenzia della Santa Sede per la Valutazione e la Promozione della Qualità delle Università e Facoltà Ecclesiastiche, AVEPRO), an attempt to promote and develop a culture of quality within the ecclesiastical institutions and enable them to aim in developing internationally valid quality criteria.

Pontifical universities are usually composed of three principal ecclesiastical faculties, theology, philosophy, and canon law, and at least one other faculty. A pontifical university specifically addresses Christian revelation and disciplines correlative to the evangelical mission of the Church as set out in the apostolic constitution Sapientia christiana.

== List of pontifical universities ==
Pontifical Institutes and Faculties are listed in the Ecclesiastical Universities article, while here are the Pontifical Universities and Atheneum.

Pontifical universities
Institutions	City	Country	Note	Reference
Pontifical Catholic University of Argentina	Buenos Aires	Argentina		
Katholieke Universiteit Leuven	Leuven	Belgium		
Université catholique de Louvain	Louvain-la-Neuve	Belgium		
The Royal and Pontifical Major University of Saint Francis Xavier of Chuquisaca	Sucre	Bolivia		
Pontifical Catholic University of Campinas	Campinas	Brazil		
Pontifical Catholic University of Goiás	Goiânia	Brazil		
Pontifical Catholic University of Minas Gerais	Belo Horizonte	Brazil		
Pontifical Catholic University of São Paulo	São Paulo	Brazil		
Pontifical Catholic University of Paraná	Curitiba	Brazil		
Pontifical Catholic University of Rio de Janeiro	Rio de Janeiro	Brazil		
Pontifical Catholic University of Rio Grande do Sul	Porto Alegre	Brazil		
Pontifical Institute of Mediaeval Studies	Toronto	Canada		
Regis College, Toronto	Toronto	Canada		
Saint Paul University	Ottawa	Canada		
Pontifical Catholic University of Chile	Santiago	Chile		
Pontifical Catholic University of Valparaiso	Valparaíso	Chile		
Pontifical Bolivarian University	Medellín	Colombia		
Pontifical Xavierian University	Bogotá	Colombia		
Pontificia Universidad Católica Madre y Maestra		Dominican Republic	Santo Domingo, Santiago de Los Caballeros, and Puerto Plata	
Pontificia Universidad Católica del Ecuador	Quito	Ecuador		
Institut Catholique de Paris	Paris	France		
Institut Catholique de Toulouse	Toulouse	France		
Catholic University of Eichstätt-Ingolstadt	Eichstätt & Ingolstadt	Germany		
Universidad de San Carlos de Guatemala	Guatemala City	Guatemala		
Pontifical Athenaeum Dharmaram Vidya Kshetram	Bangalore	India		
St Patrick's Pontifical University, Maynooth	Maynooth	Ireland	Pontifical University charter 1896	
Pontifical Atheneum of St. Anselm (Anselmianum)	Rome	Italy		
Pontifical Athenaeum Queen of the Apostles (Regina Apostolorum)	Rome	Italy		
Pontifical Gregorian University (Gregoriana)	Rome	Italy		
Pontifical Lateran University (Lateranensis)	Rome	Italy		
Pontifical University of the Holy Cross (Santa Croce)	Rome	Italy		
Pontifical University of St. Anthony (Antonianum)	Rome	Italy		
Pontifical Theological Faculty of St. Bonaventure (Seraphicum)	Rome	Italy		
Pontifical University of St. Thomas Aquinas (Angelicum)	Rome	Italy		
Pontifical Urbaniana University (Urbaniana)	Rome	Italy		
Salesian Pontifical University (Salesiana)	Rome	Italy		
Université Catholique de l'Afrique de l'Ouest (Catholic University of West Africa)	Abidjan	Ivory Coast		
Catholic University of Eastern Africa	Nairobi	Kenya		
Holy Spirit University of Kaslik	Kaslik	Lebanon		
Saint Joseph University	Beirut	Lebanon		
Pontifical University of Mexico	Mexico City	Mexico		
Pontifical Catholic University of Montenegro	Kotor	Montenegro		
Universidad Católica Santa María La Antigua	Panama City	Panama		
Universidad Católica Nuestra Señora de la Asunción	Asunción	Paraguay		
Royal and Pontifical University of San Marcos (UNMSM)		Peru		
Pontifical Catholic University of Peru	Lima	Peru		
The Pontifical and Royal University of Santo Tomas	Manila	Philippines		
Pontifical University of John Paul II	Kraków	Poland		
Catholic University of Portugal	Lisbon	Portugal		
Comillas Pontifical University	Madrid	Spain		
Pontifical University of Salamanca	Salamanca	Spain		
University of Navarra	Pamplona	Spain		
Superior Institute of Religious Sciences of St. Thomas Aquinas	Kyiv	Ukraine	since 1992. An institution of higher education in Kyiv (Ukraine), conducted by the Dominican Friars of the Vicariate General of Ukraine and affiliated to the Pontifical University of St. Thomas Aquinas (Angelicum).	
Boston College		United States		
Catholic University of America	Washington, DC	United States		
Georgetown University		United States		
Pontifical Catholic University of Puerto Rico	Ponce, Puerto Rico	United States		
Pontifical College Josephinum	Columbus, Ohio	United States		
Ecclesiastical Faculty of Theology (at the University of Saint Mary of the Lake)	Mundelein, IL	United States		
Jesuit School of Theology of Santa Clara University (at Santa Clara University)	Berkeley, CA	United States		
St. Mary's Seminary and University	Baltimore, MD	United States		
Universidad Católica del Uruguay Dámaso Antonio Larrañaga	Montevideo	Uruguay		

=== Former pontifical universities ===
Former pontifical universities
Institution	City	Country	End	Note	Reference
Heidelberg University	Heidelberg	Germany	1518	until the German Reformation in 1518	
Leipzig University	Leipzig	Germany	1518	until the German Reformation in 1518	
Lund Studium Generale (Lund University)	Lund	Sweden	1536	until the Danish Reformation	
Royal and Pontifical University of Córdoba	Córdoba	Argentina	1856	until 1856, during the presidency of Justo José de Urquiza	
Royal and Pontifical University of Mexico	Mexico City	Mexico	1865	until the Mexican War of Independence	
Sapienza University of Rome	Rome	Italy	1870	until the Proclamation of the Kingdom of Italy in 1870.	
Universidad Católica de Santo Tomás de Villanueva	Havana	Cuba	1961	until its closure in 1961, after the Cuban Revolution	
Universidad de San Ignacio	Manila	Philippines	1768	after the Expulsion of the Jesuits	
Universidad Santo Tomás de Aquino	Santo Domingo	Dominican Republic	1823	during the Unification of Hispaniola	
University of Aberdeen	Old Aberdeen	United Kingdom		until the Scottish Reformation	
University of Cambridge	Cambridge	United Kingdom		until the English Reformation	
University of Cologne	Cologne	Germany		until the French Revolutionary Wars	
University of Copenhagen	Copenhagen	Denmark		until the Danish Reformation	
University of Erfurt		Germany		until the German Reformation	
University of Freiburg		Germany		until the suppression of the Society of Jesus	
University of Glasgow	Glasgow	United Kingdom		until the Scottish Reformation	
University of Greifswald	Greifswald	Germany		until the German Reformation	
University of Mainz	Mainz	Germany		until the French Revolutionary Wars	
University of Oxford	Oxford	United Kingdom		until the English Reformation	
University of Paris	Paris	France	1793	until the French Revolution	
University of Rostock	Rostock	Germany		until the German Reformation	
University of Saint Andrews		United Kingdom		until the Scottish Reformation	
University of San Marcos	Lima	Peru		until the Peruvian War of Independence	
University of Tübingen		Germany		until the German Reformation	
University of Wittenberg		Germany		until the German Reformation	
University of Würzburg	Würzburg	Germany		until the Napoleonic Wars	
Uppsala University	Uppsala	Sweden		until the Swedish Reformation	
Milltown Institute of Theology and Philosophy	Dublin	Ireland		Pontifical Athenaeum (1968–2015)	
Heythrop College, University of London; Bellarmine Institute	London	United Kingdom	2018	until the closure of the college in 2018, when the Pontifical faculty was transferred to St Mary's University, Twickenham, becoming Mater Ecclesiae College	
Pontifical College of Saint Pius X of Đà Lạt	Da Lat	Vietnam	1977	officially closed in 1977 after the Fall of Saigon, confiscated by the government in 1980	

== Pontifical faculties ==
Pontifical faculties
Institutions	City	Country	Reference
Pontifical Faculty of Philosophy and Theology, Heiligenkreuz Abbey	Heiligenkreuz	Austria	
Theological Faculty, Catholic-Theological Private University Linz	Linz	Austria	
Facoltà di Teologia di Lugano	Lugano	Switzerland	
Marianum Theological Faculty	Rome	Italy	
Pontifical Faculty at the University of Saint Mary of the Lake (Mundelein Seminary)	Mundelein, IL	United States	
Pontifical Faculty of the Immaculate Conception (PFIC), Dominican House of Studies	Washington, DC	United States	
School of Theology and Religious Studies, The Catholic University of America	Washington, DC	United States	
Wedabhakti Pontifical Faculty of Theology (Sanata Dharma University)	Yogyakarta	Indonesia	

== Pontifical colleges ==
A number of national Roman Colleges designated as Pontifical Colleges serve primarily as residence halls for seminarians sent by the bishops of a particular country to study there, such as the Belgian Pontifical College. They may also provide housing for priests pursuing advanced degrees. Students may take classes at the Gregorian, the Angelicum or other universities in Rome. In addition, other members of the clergy may reside there when in Rome.

== See also ==
- Catholic university
- Doctor of Canon Law
- Ecclesiastical university
- Licentiate of Sacred Theology
- List of Roman Catholic seminaries
- Pontifical universities in Rome

== Sources ==
- Matthew Bunson, ed. (2010). Catholic Almanac 2010. Our Sunday Visitor. pp. 546–550.
