= Bachelor of Sacred Theology =

Graduate-level academic degree

The Baccalaureate in Sacred Theology (Latin: Sacrae Theologiae Baccalaureus; abbreviated STB), not to be confused with a Bachelor of Arts in Theology, is the first of three ecclesiastical degrees in Roman Catholic theology (the second being the Licentiate in Sacred Theology and the third being the Doctorate in Sacred Theology) which are conferred by a number of pontifical faculties around the world.

Despite its designation as a "baccalaureate", a holdover from historic nomenclature, it is a graduate level, academic degree in theology, equivalent in the United States and the United Kingdom to a first professional degree. As an ecclesiastical degree, it is conferred in the name of and by the authority of the Holy See. It is often granted alongside a civil degree, such as the Master of Divinity. The curriculum varies slightly from faculty to faculty, but generally requires competency in Latin or Greek as well as the completion of the "first cycle" of theological training, a three to five year course of studies that aims for a comprehensive competence in philosophy and theology. The basic requirements for any of the three ecclesiastical degree are regulated by the Holy See, most recently in the Apostolic Constitution Veritatis Gaudium.
