= Ecclesiastical judge =

Within the Catholic Church, an ecclesiastical judge (Latin: judex, or judex ecclesiasticus) is an ecclesiastical person who possesses ecclesiastical jurisdiction either in general or in the strict sense. The judge presides over all baptized persons within their jurisdiction.

== Ecclesiastical court ==
The official body appointed by the qualified ecclesiastical authority for the administration of justice is called a court (judicium ecclesiasticum, tribunal, auditorium) Every such ecclesiastical court consists at the least of two sworn officials: the ecclesiastical judge who gives the decision and the clerk of the court (scriba, secretarius, scriniarius, notarius, cancellarius), whose duty is to keep a record of the proceedings and the decision. As a rule, however, an ecclesiastical court forms a collegiate tribunal, the members of which either join with the presiding officer in giving the decision as judges (judices) or merely advise with him as councillors (auditores, assessores, consultores, consiliarii).

Connected with the courts are advocates, procurators, syndics, defenders, promoters, conservators, apparitors, messengers etc. The procurators and advocates conduct the case as the representatives or defenders of the parties to the suit; the syndic is the counsel of a juridical person, a collegiate body or a chapter. The chief duty of the conservators is to represent the rights of the personae miserabiles, i.e. members of orders, the poor, widows, orphans. The fiscal promoter (promotor fiscalis) is appointed by the ecclesiastical authorities to watch over ecclesiastical discipline, consequently in penal cases he appears as public prosecutor. A defensor matrimonii, or defender of the matrimonial tie, assists in suits concerning the invalidity of a marriage.

Up until 1858, ecclesiastical judges tried church clergy in church courts or ecclesiastical courts. Charges dealt in these courts were often very lenient, especially when dealt to church clergymen.

== Qualifications ==
The ecclesiastical judge must have certain physical and moral qualities. He must be competent, i.e. must be authorized to pass judgment on a given person in a given case. Proceedings held before a judge without competence are null and void. It is necessary to have full use of his senses and understanding, and suitable legal knowledge; the person appointed must be at least 20 years old; but 18 years will suffice for a judge appointed by the pope or if the parties agree to it. The judge must have a good reputation, must not be excommunicated, suspended from office, or under an interdict.

The judge must be impartial; a suspicion of partiality attaches to the judge who is personally interested in a case or is related by blood within the fourth degree to one of the parties, or connected with one by marriage, or who lives in the same house, or dines at a common table, or is otherwise friendly, or on the other hand inimical, towards one of the parties, and he may be rejected (recusari, exceptio judicis suspecti) by the accused or by both parties as prejudiced (suspectus). If objection be raised against a judge on the ground of prejudice, which must be done in writing and if possible before the beginning of the action, arbitrators are to pass on the objection; if, however, objection be raised against the delegate of the bishop, the decision rests with the bishop. If the objection be declared well-founded, the judge transfers the case, with the concurrence of the party who brought the accusation, to another or to a higher judge.

If the judge lacks the necessary qualifications, and this be known to the parties in the suit, the decision is invalid; if, however, his unfitness be unknown to the parties, and he follow statute canon law, the church supplements the deficiency, even if the judge have acted in bad faith.

== Jurisdiction ==
Ecclesiastical jurisdiction is exercised over all baptized persons. Those subject to the jurisdiction of a certain judge are said to be within the competence (competentia) of his court, or have their forum in him. The forum is either the free, voluntary choice of the parties (forum prorogatum), or it is defined by law (forum legale), but in criminal and matrimonial cases there is no forum prorogatum. Ecclesiastics can choose another judge only with the permission of the bishop, and in this case he must be an ecclesiastic The legal forum (forum legale) is either ordinary, if the proper course of the regular courts is followed, or extraordinary, if for legal reasons a regular court is passed over. Moreover, the forum legale is either general (commune), corresponding to the universally valid law, or special or privileged (speciale sive privilegiatum), resting on privilege, as in the case of ecclesiastics on account of the privilegium fori which they cannot renounce.

As the jurisdiction of a judge is generally limited to a defined locality, the forum commune is fixed by the domicile or quasi-domicile of the accused. The axiom holds: Actor sequitur forum rei, the plaintiff goes to the court of the accused. Domicile is that place where one actually resides with the intention of always remaining there. Quasi-domicile is determined by actual residence at the place and the intention to remain there at least the greater part of the year; there is also a domicile by operation of law, legal or fictitious domicile (domicilium legale sive fictitium)—thus a wife may be subject to the jurisdiction of the domicile of the husband, children to that of the parents, religious to that of the place where the monastery is situated, persons having no fixed abode to that of the present place of residence.

A process can be instituted at Rome against an ecclesiastic who is only accidentally there. Besides the—usual—forum domicilii, there is also that of the object (forum rei sitae, where the thing is situated), i.e. complaint can be brought before the judge in whose district the controverted object is; the forum where the contract is made (forum contractus), i.e. the parties can bring action before the judge in whose district the disputed contract has been made; that of the offence (forum delicti), within the jurisdiction where the offence was committed.

There is also a forum arising from the connection of matters (forum connexitatis sive continentiae causarum), if the matters in dispute are so interrelated that one cannot be decided without the other; the forum of a counterplea (forum reconventionis sive reaccusationis), i.e. in a criminal suit the defendant can, on his side, accuse the plaintiff in the court of the judge before whom he himself is to be tried. If the judge wishes to bring an accusation, the superior appoints the judge who is to hear it. The decision of an incompetent judge is valid if by common error (error communis) he is held to be competent In civil disputes the parties can entrust the decision to any desired arbiter.

== Appeals ==
If the judge render a defective decision, appeal can be taken to the next higher judge; this relation of the courts to one another and the successive course of appeals (gradus), called succession of instances, follows the order of superiority. From the beginning the bishop, or his representative, the archdeacon, or the "official" (officialis), or the vicar-general, was the judge in first instance for all suits, contentious or criminal, which arose in the diocese or in the corresponding administrative district, so far as such suits were not withdrawn from his jurisdiction by the common law. The court of second instance was originally the provincial synod, later the metropolitan. The court of the third instance was that of the pope. The court of the first instance for bishops was the provincial synod, the metropolitan, the exarch or the patriarch; the court of second instance was that of the pope; only the pope could be the judge of first instance for exarchs and patriarchs.

Since the Middle Ages the pope is the judge of first instance in all more important episcopal causes (causae maiores, graviores, difficiliores, arduae), the number and extent of which are in no way exactly definable, but to which above all belong the causae criminales graviores contra episcopos—more serious criminal charges against bishops Conformably to this the diocesan bishop or his representative (the vicar-general, or officialis, or some other diocesan authority) became the judge of the court of first instance, so far as common law has not withdrawn from him this jurisdiction. If the see is vacant the vicar-capitular is judge of the court of first instance. The judge of the second instance is the metropolitan. For archdioceses, as a rule, the judge of second instance is a neighbouring archbishop or bishop appointed by the Holy See. The same ordinance also applies to exempt bishoprics. The court of the third instance is the Apostolic See, but in the causae maiores it is the court of first instance. As, however, the pope is the judex ordinarius omnium, the ordinary ecclesiastical judge of all, ecclesiastical suits without exception can be brought or summoned before the papal forum as the court of first instance.

In the Middle Ages the lower courts were often evaded, or the popes summoned the suits at one before their forum. This custom had some advantages on account of the better legal education and greater impartiality of the members of the papal court, but the administration of justice was delayed and made more costly by the rule enforced in the papal courts that the parties must appear in person. Such summonses to Rome, as to the court of first instance, diminish unduly the authority of the lower courts. To put an end, therefore, to constant complaint on this point, the decretals ordained that in future, before the rendering of the sentence, no one could appeal to a higher court without giving a sufficient reason to the judge a quo (from whom the appeal was made), and that the appeal could only be accepted by the judge ad quem (to whom appeal lies) after he had satisfied himself of the validity of the appeal. Lawsuits, therefore, pending before the Apostolic See were to be tried by a judge belonging to the place whence the appeal came, and especially appointed by the pope. In the late Middle Ages rulers of countries were frequently granted for their domains the papal privilegia de non evocando (exemption from summons); in some cases, they forbade the appeal to a foreign court.

Following the precedents of the Synod of Constance and Synod of Basle, the Council of Trent decreed: the court of the bishop is the court of first instance Each suit must be brought to a close within at least two years. During this period no appeal is permitted, neither can the higher judge summon the case before his forum; an appeal before the lapse of two years is permissible only if a final sentence has been pronounced.

In case of appeal to the Apostolic See, or if the latter, for good reasons, summons a suit from the beginning before its forum, the suit is to be decided either at Rome or by delegated judges on the spot (judices in partibus). As on account of the remoteness of the place where the dispute arose and the consequent lack of knowledge of local persons, unsuitable judges have been at times appointed at the place where the dispute arose, the bishops are each to select, on occasion of the provincial—or diocesan synod, at least four men (judices synodales) having the qualities designated by Boniface VIII, and present their names to the Apostolic See, which in its selection of judges is to be so limited to the persons thus named that the delegation of any other person is invalid; as provincial and diocesan synods are no longer regularly held, bishops are permitted to make this selection with the advice of the diocesan chapter; consequently, judges so appointed are called judices prosynodales.

At present, this also is no longer customary: on the contrary, the Apostolic See appoints its representatives in partibus entirely independently, but it is so arranged that the delegation is bestowed on neighbor bishops and archbishops for a definite term of years. Such delegation is all the more necessary in case a State does not permit ecclesiastical suits to be tried outside of its boundaries, or will only permit the judgement of such a court to be executed within its territories by the secular power.

== See also ==
- Officialis
