= Veritatis gaudium =

2018 apostolic constitution by Pope Francis

Veritatis gaudium Latin for 'The Joy of Truth' Apostolic constitution of Pope Francis
- Signature date: 8 December 2017
- Text: In Latin; In English

Veritatis gaudium (The Joy of Truth) is an apostolic constitution on ecclesiastical universities and faculties. It was signed by Pope Francis on 8 December 2017 and entered into force on 29 January 2018. It updates the 1979 apostolic constitution Sapientia christiana. The document is 87 pages in length. The new norms took legal effect on the first day of the 2018-2019 academic year or of the 2019 academic year, depending on the school year of particular institutions.

== Scope ==
The document deals only with ecclesiastical universities and faculties, which are distinguished from Catholic institutions of higher education generally in that they offer degrees granted by authority of the Holy See. Ex corde ecclesiae is not affected by the new document and remains unchanged. It replaces the norms of the apostolic constitution Sapientia christiana, promulgated by Pope John Paul II on 15 April 1979. The document obrogates all laws, customs, and privileges contrary to Veritatis gaudium.

== Structure ==
The first part (on "common norms") deals with the nature and purpose of ecclesiastical universities and faculties. The second part ("special norms") deals with specific norms regarding faculties of theology, canon law, and philosophy.

== Innovations ==
The document makes provision for "distance learning", something which had not existed at the time of Sapientia christiana. The document also makes provision for refugees and migrants for whom production of the requisite academic verifications would be impossible.
