= Leigos para o Desenvolvimento =

Coordinates: 38°46′27.23″N 9°9′32.76″W

Leigos para o Desenvolvimento – LD
- Abbreviation: LD
- Established: 1986; 40 years ago
- Headquarters: Estrada da Torre, n.º 26, 1750-296, Lisbon, Portugal
- Affiliations: Jesuits, Catholic
- Website: LD

Leigos para o Desenvolvimento (Lay Association for Development) is a Non-governmental organization (NGO) that assists people in their integral development. It was founded in 1986 under the auspices of the Jesuits in Lisbon, Portugal, and grew from assisting people in former Portuguese colonies to a wider mission abroad and in Portugal.

== History ==
In 1984, António Vaz Pinto of the Society of Jesus took his experience at the Jesuit University Center Manuel da Nóbrega (CUMN) at the University of Coimbra to Lisbon and founded Padre António Vieira University Center (CUPAV). With students from CUMN, he founded Leigos para o Desenvolvimento (LD) in 1986.

In its thirty-first year, LD had 14 volunteers in Africa, working in education, training and employment, and community development. Its volunteers are in Angola, Mozambique, Sao Tome, Principe, and Portugal.
