= Entreculturas =

Spain-based non-governmental organization

Coordinates: 40°26′31.23″N 3°41′3.23″W

Location
- Maldonado, 1. 28006; Madrid

Information
- Type: Educational NGO
- Established: 1985; 41 years ago
- Director: Daniel Villanueva
- Staff: 74
- Publication: Revista Entreculturas
- Affiliation: Spanish Jesuits, Catholic
- Website: Entreculturas (in Spanish)

Entreculturas is a non-governmental organization for development cooperation, the international social outreach of the Spanish Province of Jesuits, founded in Madrid in 1985. It focuses mainly on educating the poor in Latin America and Africa, while responding to humanitarian crises and also educating to global awareness in Spain.

== Activities ==
In Latin America and Africa, Entreculturas supports initiatives that promote education of the disadvantaged, ranging from teacher training and building classrooms and vocational training centres, to supporting educational programs on radio, to nutritional programs.

Entreculturas offers free educational resources in Spanish on line, as well as informative videos. It sends volunteers abroad for insertion experiences, to places like an orphanage in Nairobi, Kenya.
