= Centre for Research and Popular Service =

Coordinates: 17°58′6.43″S 67°6′39.38″W

- Abbreviation: CISEP
- Established: 1984; 42 years ago
- Location(s): Ayacucho No. 559, between October 6 and Soria Galvarro; Oruro, Bolivia
- Chairman: Osvaldo Chirveches Pinaya
- Director: José Luis Paniagua Boyerman
- Affiliations: Jesuit, Catholic
- Website: (in Spanish) CISEP

Centre for Research and Popular Service (CISEP) was founded by the Jesuits in 1984 in Oruro, Bolivia, in response to the nationalization of mines, for the preservation of jobs and development of alternatives in the urban labor sector. CISEP works at the national and regional level on issues of research, environment, cultural promotion, and citizenship.
