= Center for Studies and Social Action =

Coordinates: 13°0′5.72″S 38°30′41.28″W

Center for Studies & Social Action
- Abbreviation: CEAS
- Established: 1967; 59 years ago
- Purpose: Empower the marginalized
- Location(s): R. Prof. Aristides Novis, 101; Salvador, Bahia, Brazil
- Region served: Northeast Brazil
- Affiliations: Jesuit, Catholic
- Website: CEAS (in Portuguese)

Center for Studies and Social Action (CEAS) was founded by the Society of Jesus in 1967 and works to diminish poverty and social exclusion] in the Northeast Region, Brazil. It lends its assistance to urban and rural groups and produces a journal.
