= History of De La Salle University =

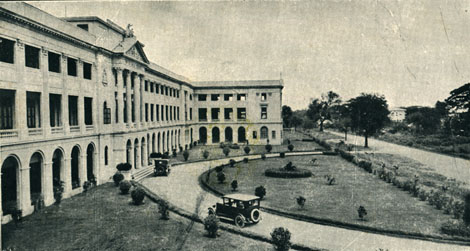
St. La Salle Hall c. 1925

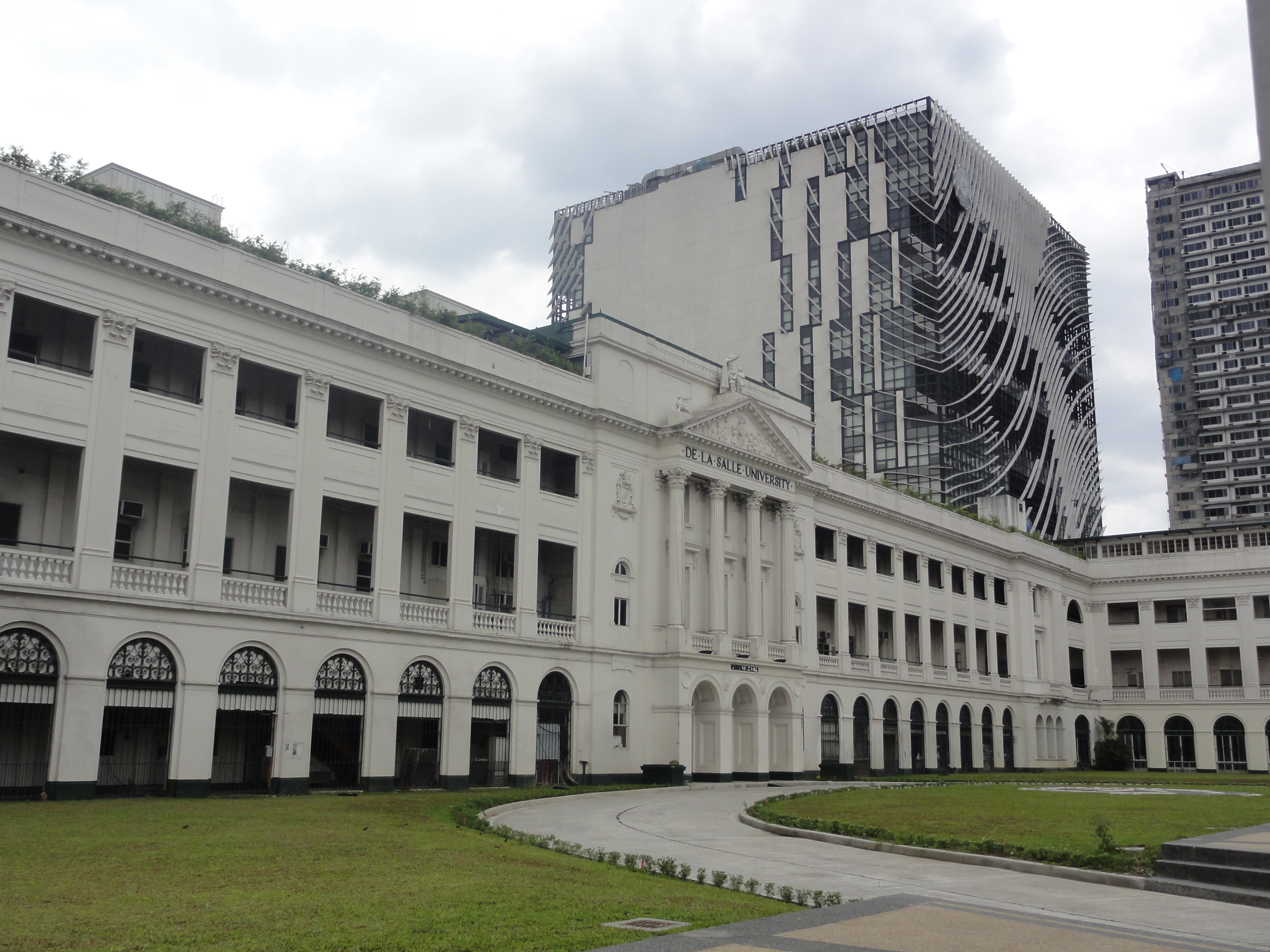
St. La Salle Hall in 2014 (with Henry Sy Sr. Hall in the background)

The history of De La Salle University dates back to 1911, when the Christian Brothers opened the De La Salle College (DLSC) in Nozaleda Street, Paco, Manila, Philippines. It is the first La Salle school established by the Christian Brothers in the Philippines, and the oldest constituent of De La Salle Philippines (DLSP), a network of 16 Lasallian educational institutions established in 2006 replacing the De La Salle University System.

== Early history ==
In 1901, three years after Spain ceded control of the Philippines to the United States, the Americans established a new public education system using English as the medium of instruction. The Catholic educational institutions in the country at that time, however, continued using Spanish as their medium, and this practice raised concerns that the Catholic children would lose out in the quest for leadership roles under the American administration. The Americans tried convincing the Spanish Jesuits of Ateneo to use English as the new language of instruction, but the Jesuits refused the American demand and remained loyal to Spain. Meanwhile, the Catholic teaching congregation Brothers of the Christian Schools (FSC, from the Latin: Fratres Scholarum Christianarum) had by then established their presence in 35 countries, including several Lasallian schools in Europe, North America, Latin America, Africa, and Asia. Thus, the Americans turned to the Christian Brothers to pave the way for the introduction of English-based quality Catholic education in the country.

De La Salle College was established by nine Christian Brothers at the request of Manila Archbishop Jeremiah James Harty. Brothers Blimond Pierre Eilenbecker, a Luxembourgish-born French director, Aloysius Gonzaga McGiverin, the sole American brother, and Augusto Correge of France arrived on March 10, 1911. On May 13, the remaining six Brothers arrived. They were Brothers Ptolomee Louis Duffaux, future President Goslin Camillus Henri, D. Joseph, Celba John Lynam, Imar William Reale, and Martin, from France and Ireland, respectively. De La Salle College formally opened on June 16, 1911, initially with 125 students. By July 10, the total number of students reached 175. The campus was located on a 13,000-square-meter (140,000 sq ft) lot in Nozaleda Street, Paco, Manila, which was once the original site of the mansion of Spanish-Filipino tycoon Luis Perez-Samanillo, of which the land was then donated to the American School for expatriate families. After the school was vacated, the land was donated by the American government to the Lasallian Brothers after Archbishop Harty's request was granted. This college became the first La Salle school in the Philippines.

On February 12, 1912, the college was incorporated under the sole ownership of the college director (now called president), who was still the Frenchman Br. Blimond Pierre. In March 1912, four more Brothers arrived to answer Br. Blimond Pierre's request for more teachers. They were Brothers Wilfrid, Basilian Coin, Dorotheus Joseph, and future president Egbert Xavier Kelly, all from Ireland. During the early years, the Brothers were allowed to offer the full primary and intermediate programs and a three-year commercial secondary school program. The Commercial High School Diploma was first conferred in 1915 to three graduates. In November 1917, the school was allowed to confer an Associate in Arts degree. Brothers Donatian Felix, V. Andrew, Albinus Peter, Flavius Leo, Alphonsus Henry, Felix, and David King were sent to the school to teach various subjects from 1917 to 1929.

In 1921, due to the lack of space on the original Nozaleda Campus in Paco, the Brothers made a decision to move into 2401 Taft Avenue in Malate, which is its present location. Brother Acisclus Michael, FSC was able to secure a 30,300-square-meter (326,000 sq ft) lot at the southernmost boundary of Manila. The Paco property was then sold on March 19, 1920, to Don Vicente Madrigal, who was a wealthy shipping magnate. A groundbreaking ceremony was held on March 3, 1920, on a purchased lot along Taft Avenue. More than a year later on September 24, 1921, the teachers together with 425 students trooped on foot from Paco to a half-finished school designed by architect Tomás Mapúa. Classes on the new Taft campus formally started on October 3, 1921, and the building was completed on December 15, 1924.

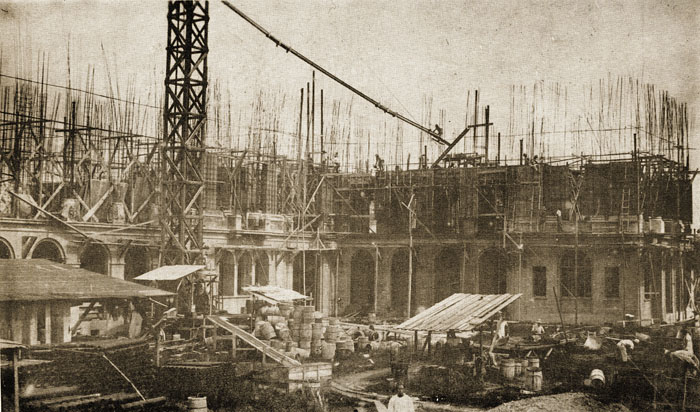
Construction of St. La Salle Hall c. 1921

In 1924, only 13 years after the Christian Brothers opened the doors of its new school to young boys, De La Salle College was already recognized as the best private school in the country by the Board of Educational Survey created by the Philippine Legislature, which was tasked to conduct a study of the quality of education and all the educational institutions, facilities, and agencies in the country. In 1920, the school officially launched its two-year Associate in Arts commercial course, which was its first tertiary-level course. The school's catalog for 1925 listed courses for an Associate in Arts, a two-year Commerce curriculum, and a Bachelor of Arts and a Master of Arts, although the last degree was never conferred before World War II. In 1930, the college was authorized to confer the degrees of Bachelor of Science in Education and Master of Science of Education. The last pre-war arts degree holders graduated in 1931. The Associate in Arts program was then discontinued because of the department's lack of staff. The Bachelor of Science in Commerce degree was then conferred in its place in 1931, after a third year had been added to the initial two-year program.

== World War II ==
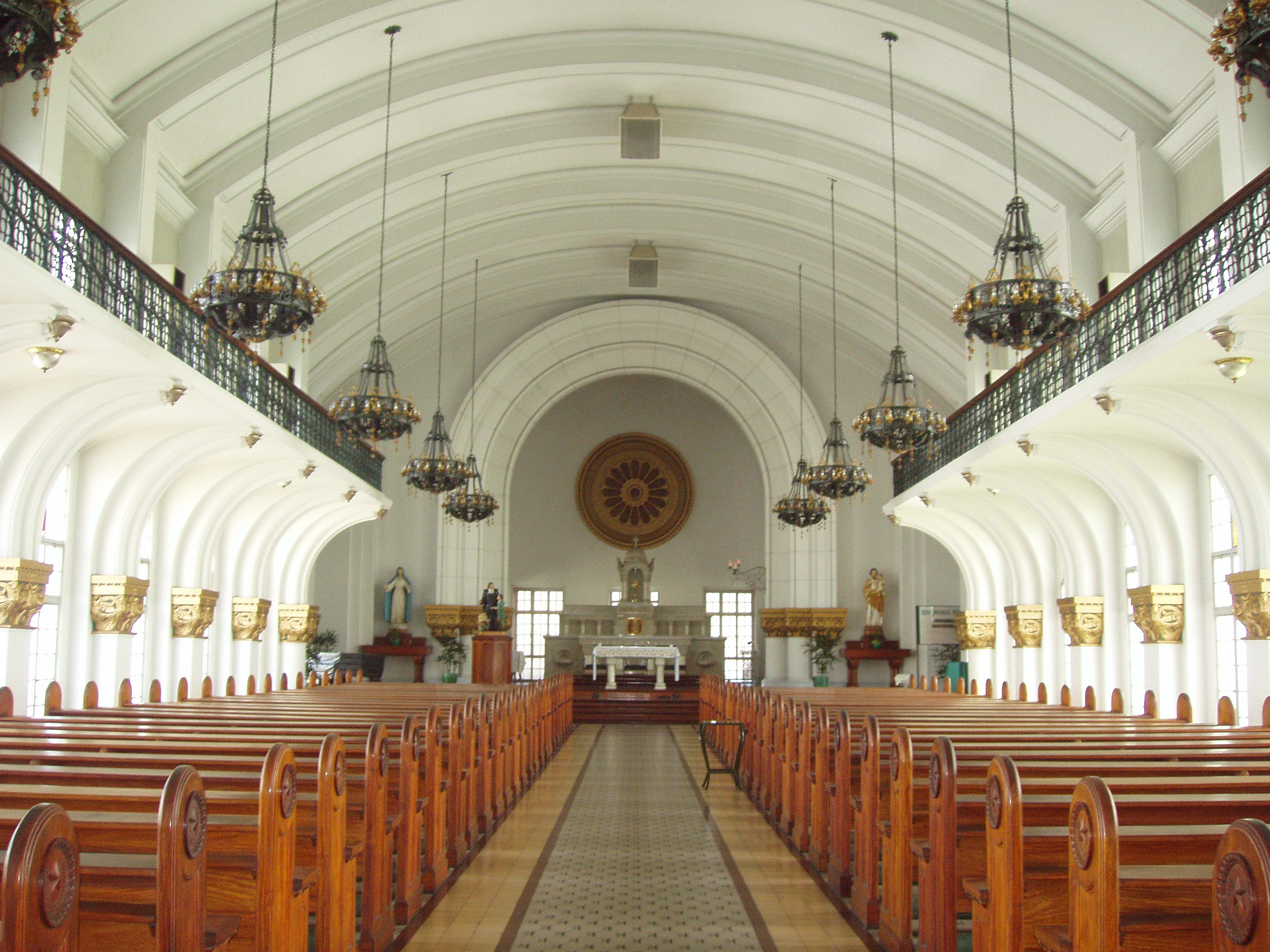
The Chapel of the Most Blessed Sacrament on the southwestern wing of St. La Salle Hall

During the Second World War, the Japanese forces in Manila forcibly took over the De La Salle College grounds and turned the campus into their South Manila defense quarters. Classes continued during the War starting in school year 1943–44 but the curriculum was severely reduced. Repeated bombings of the vicinity resulted in the total destruction of the college gymnasium, its library holdings, as well as laboratory equipment. On February 12, 1945, as American forces were making their way back to Manila and its environs, a small group of Japanese soldiers massacred 16 out of the 17 Brothers (all Europeans) residing in the Taft Campus, as well as several families who had taken refuge with them in the school chapel of the St. La Salle Hall. Only one survived the massacre – Brother Antonius Von Jesus, FSC despite being severely wounded by the Japanese soldiers. Brother Antonius was found by the American and Filipino forces who entered the La Salle campus a few days after February 12. Then-De La Salle College Brother President, Brother Egbert Xavier, FSC went missing one day before the massacre on February 12, 1945, presumably taken by Japanese soldiers.

The end of the war brought the imprisoned American De La Salle Brothers back home from the Japanese Los Baños concentration camp. They resumed classes in July 1945 in spite of lacking manpower and facilities; 1945 saw 60 boys graduating from high school at the end of the school year. Recognizing the role of education in reconstructing the Philippines, the Brothers expanded the Commerce curriculum into a four-year program.

== Post-war recovery and development ==
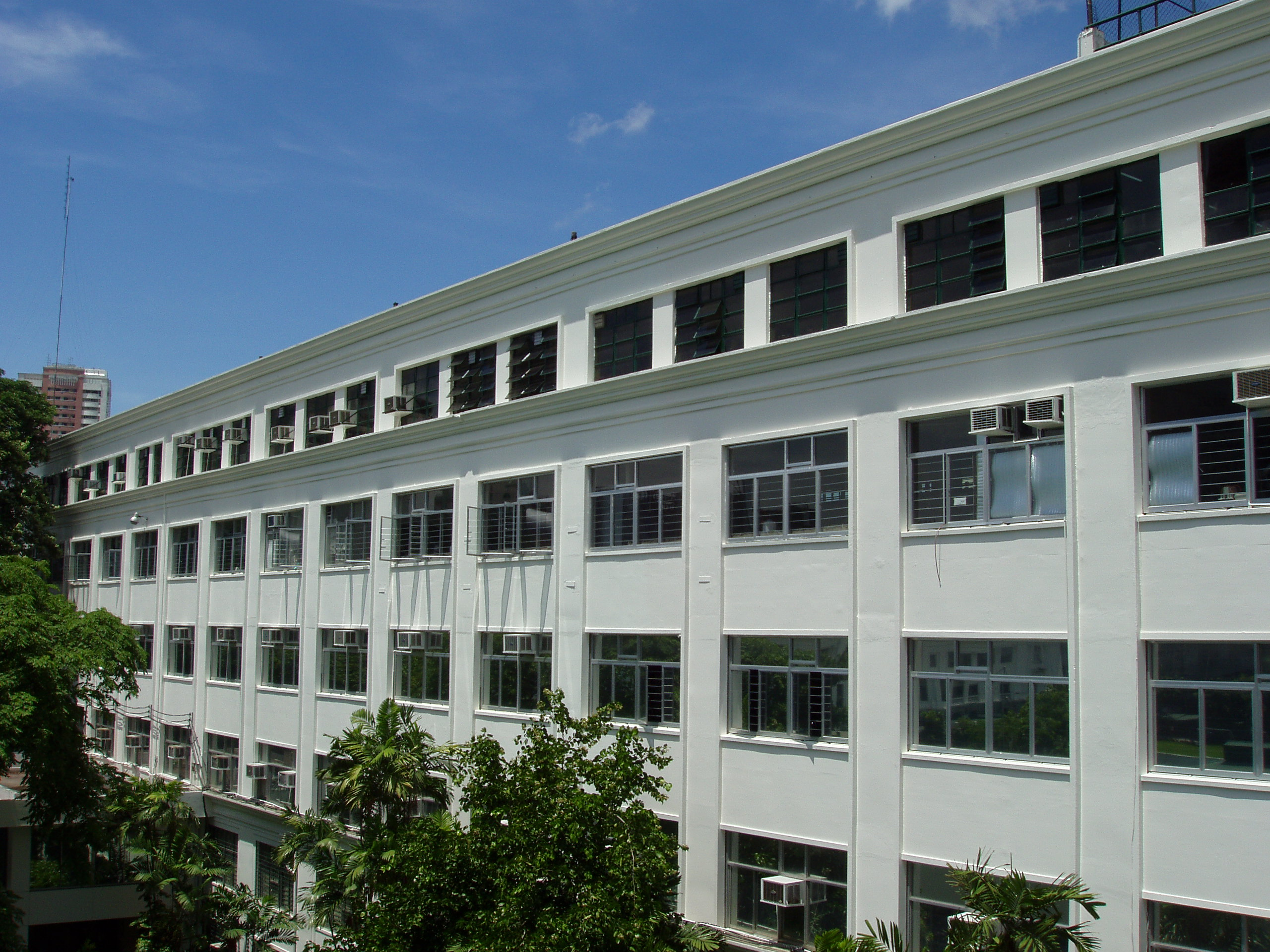
St. Joseph Hall

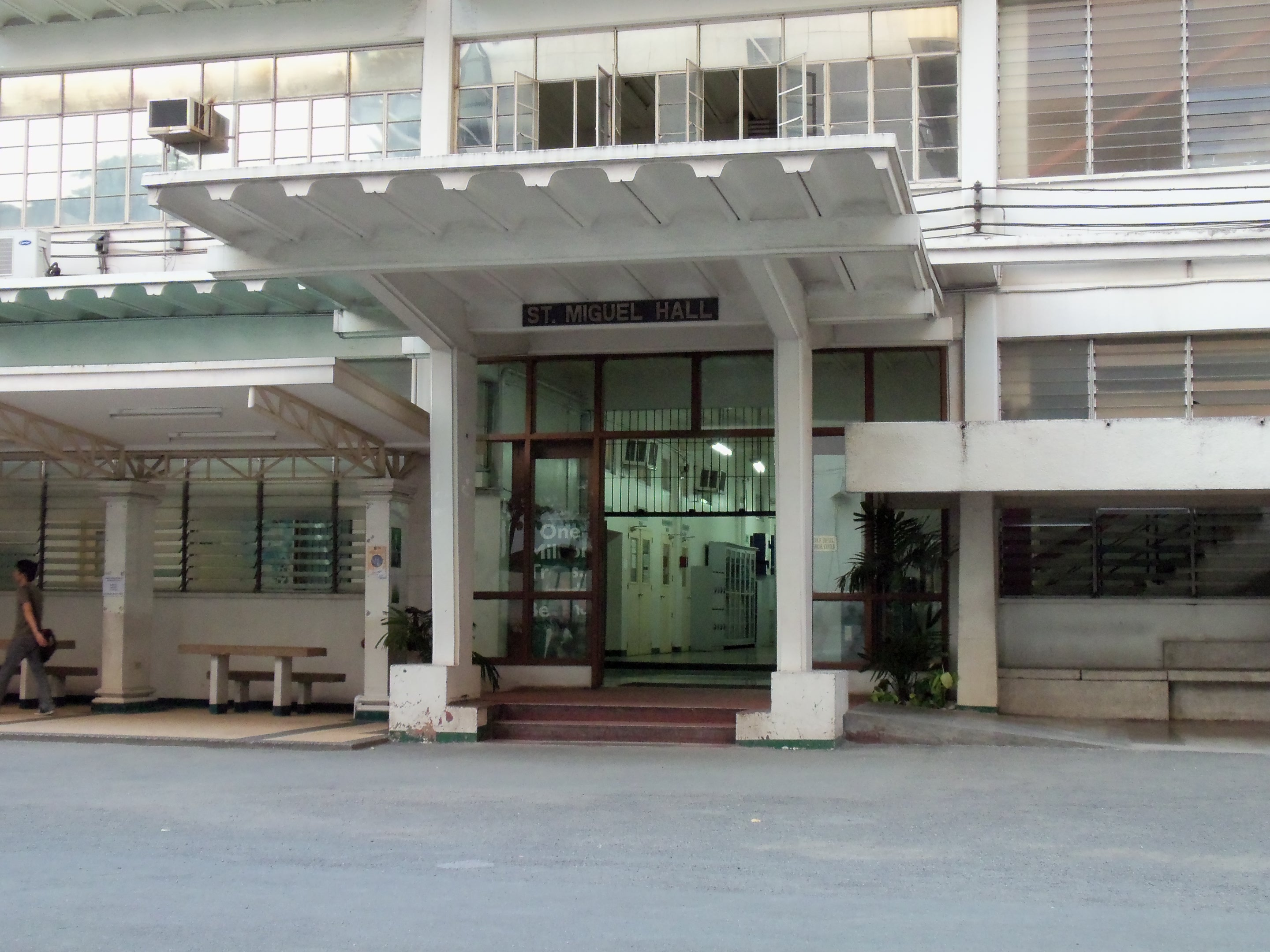
St. Miguel Hall

Velasco Hall

The post-war years saw the establishment of numerous undergraduate schools and units. In 1947, the undergraduate school of Engineering was established, followed by Arts and Sciences in 1953, Education in 1959, Industrial Technology in 1973, and Career Development in 1980. De La Salle's Graduate School of Business Administration was established in 1960, followed by Education in 1963. In 1979, the College of Industrial Technology was merged with the College of Engineering as an Engineering Technology Program. In 1981, the Center for Planning, Information, and Computer Science was organized prompting the initial offering of the Bachelor of Science in Computer Science program. Beginning school year 1984–85, the Computer Science Program was spun off as a program under the College of Computer Studies. In 1982, the La Salle Teacher Training Center was put up to revive an earlier education program and in 1987, this center was elevated to the La Salle School of Education. The events of the 1970s were crucial to the development of De La Salle as a social institution. The school was exclusively for boys until 1973 when it admitted female students. That same year, a blueprint called De La Salle Ten Years was published, projecting the planned improvements of the school from 1973 to 1983, and was updated yearly.

== Attaining university status ==
On February 19, 1975, De La Salle College was granted university status under the presidency of Brother H. Gabriel Connon, FSC and became known as De La Salle University. Another milestone school year was 1981–82, when the university adopted the year-round trimestral calendar for all units instead of the traditional semestral academic schedule. The trimestral system allows its students to graduate earlier than their counterparts in other schools that employ the semestral system. In 1987, the then 5-campus De La Salle University System was organized under the term of Br. Andrew Gonzalez, FSC composed of De La Salle University (Taft Avenue, Manila), De La Salle–College of Saint Benilde (Taft Avenue, Manila), the 7-hectare (17-acre) De La Salle Santiago Zobel School (Ayala Alabang Village, Muntinlupa, Metro Manila), the 27-hectare (67-acre) De La Salle University-Dasmarinas (Dasmarinas, Cavite) and the 8-hectare (20-acre) De La Salle Medical and Health Sciences Institute (formerly known as De La Salle University – Health Sciences Campus in Dasmarinas, Cavite). Since then more Lasallian schools were added, most notably the traditionally all-boys La Salle Green Hills school (opened in 1959 in Ortigas Ave., Mandaluyong), De La Salle Lipa (Lipa City, Batangas), De La Salle Araneta University (Malabon) and La Salle College Antipolo (Antipolo, Rizal). From 1987 up to 2008, the university officially became known as De La Salle University – Manila.

On March 28, 1994, the university had full Internet connection, and was one of the first Philippine schools to be connected to the Internet. The university then created its official website, dlsu.edu.ph in December of the same year. In 1996, graduate and undergraduate students were given Internet accounts, and the university became the first Philippine educational institution online. During school year 1995–96, DLSU Professional Schools was established, comprising the College of Computer Studies and the Graduate School of Business. Both were granted semi-autonomous status, which allowed them certain freedom to come up with their own academic and hiring policies, pay scale, among other things. In 2002, the College of Computer Studies was reintegrated into the university.

== Recent history ==
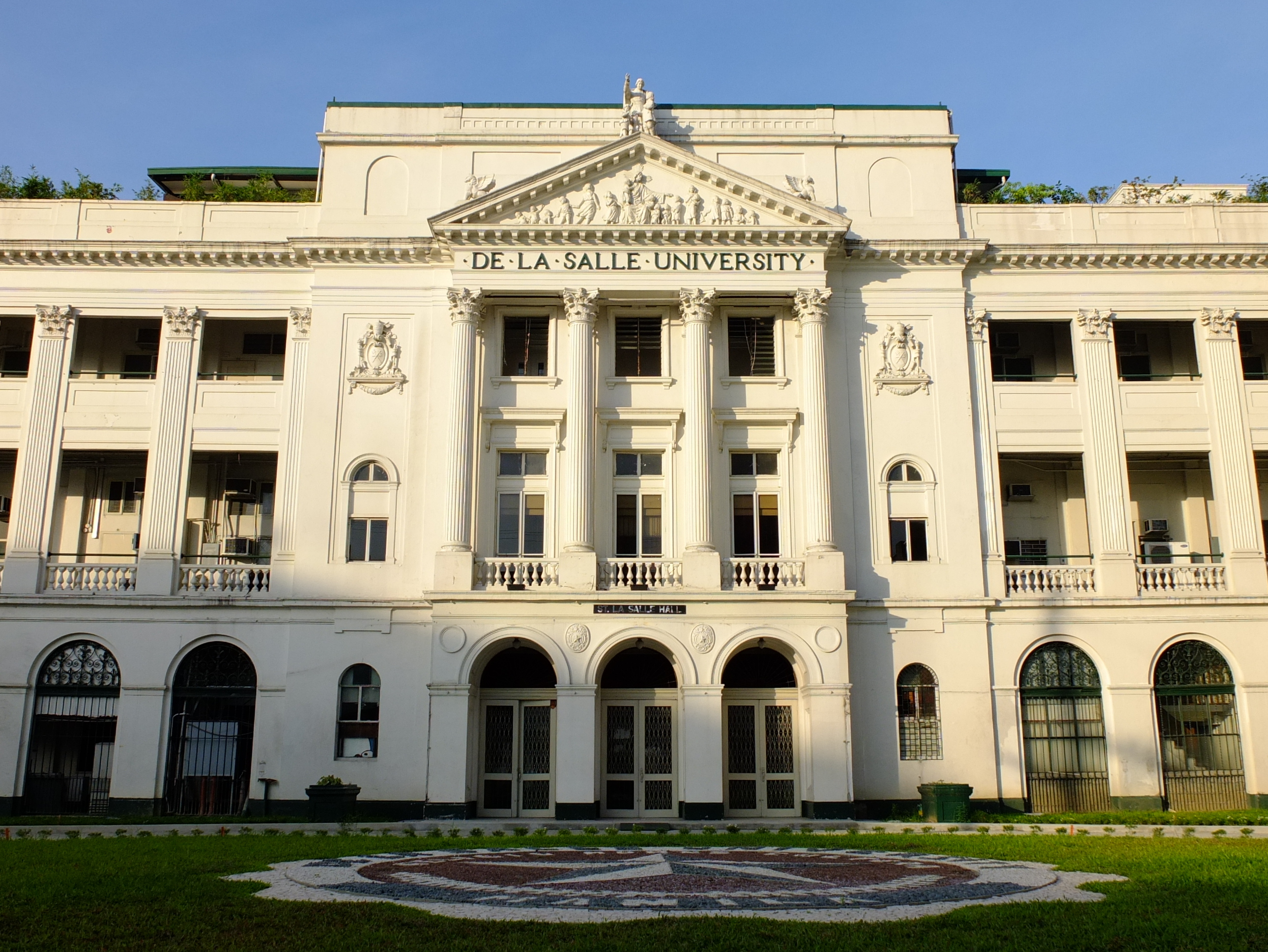
Facade of the renovated St. La Salle Hall

In July 2006, De La Salle-Professional Schools, Inc. separated from DLSU-Manila making it fully autonomous. In March 2007, the College of Computer Studies was recognized as a Center of Excellence for Information Technology by the Commission on Higher Education. The College of Science's four departments, Biology, Chemistry, Physics, and Mathematics, were all reawarded with Centers of Excellence titles in their respective fields. In May 2007, as part of the reorganization included in the implementation of De La Salle Philippines, several administrative positions were renamed such as Chancellor from Executive Vice President.

Before 2007 ended, the Brothers of Christian Schools named Dr. Carmerlita Quebengco as a Lasallian Affiliate, the highest recognition bestowed by the De La Salle Brothers. The Board of Trustees of the university also conferred to Dr. Carmelita Quebengco AFSC the Chancellor Emeritus status after serving the university for 12 years as Executive Vice President and one year as Chancellor. In December 2007, Br. Bernard S. Oca, FSC who served as President of the De La Salle Professional Schools, announced the plan to reintegrate the Graduate School of Business.

School facilities and buildings were renovated such as the St. La Salle Hall in 2011 as part of the university's Centennial Renewal Plan, a project that aims to construct and renovate facilities inside the campus. Construction of the Henry Sy Sr. Hall began on December 2, 2010. A 14-story building, it replaced DLSU's football field and was completed by December 2012. It is estimated to cost ₱1.4 billion (US$32.5 million). The Henry Sy Sr. Hall also serves as the home of the university library, now called the Learning Commons, and has almost four hectares of floor space. In line with this, DLSU entered an eight-year agreement with the Philippine Sports Commission. Under the contract, DLSU will fund the ₱7.4 million (US$171,000) renovation of the Rizal Memorial Track and Football Stadium. DLSU will get to use the facilities in return.

In 2012, the 50-hectare (120-acre) De La Salle Canlubang was formally merged with De La Salle University and became an extension of DLSU. It was inaugurated as the De La Salle University Science and Technology Complex, and later renamed as the De La Salle University – Laguna Campus. In September 2013, the Bases Conversion and Development Authority (BCDA) has awarded to De La Salle University the lease and development of a seven-story, 1,395-square-meter (15,020 sq ft) institutional lot in Bonifacio Global City in Taguig. DLSU signed a contract with the BCDA in October 2013. It is now the DLSU Rufino Campus College of Law provided by the Rufino family. The campus houses 17 classrooms, an auditorium, an arbitration room, and a moot court.

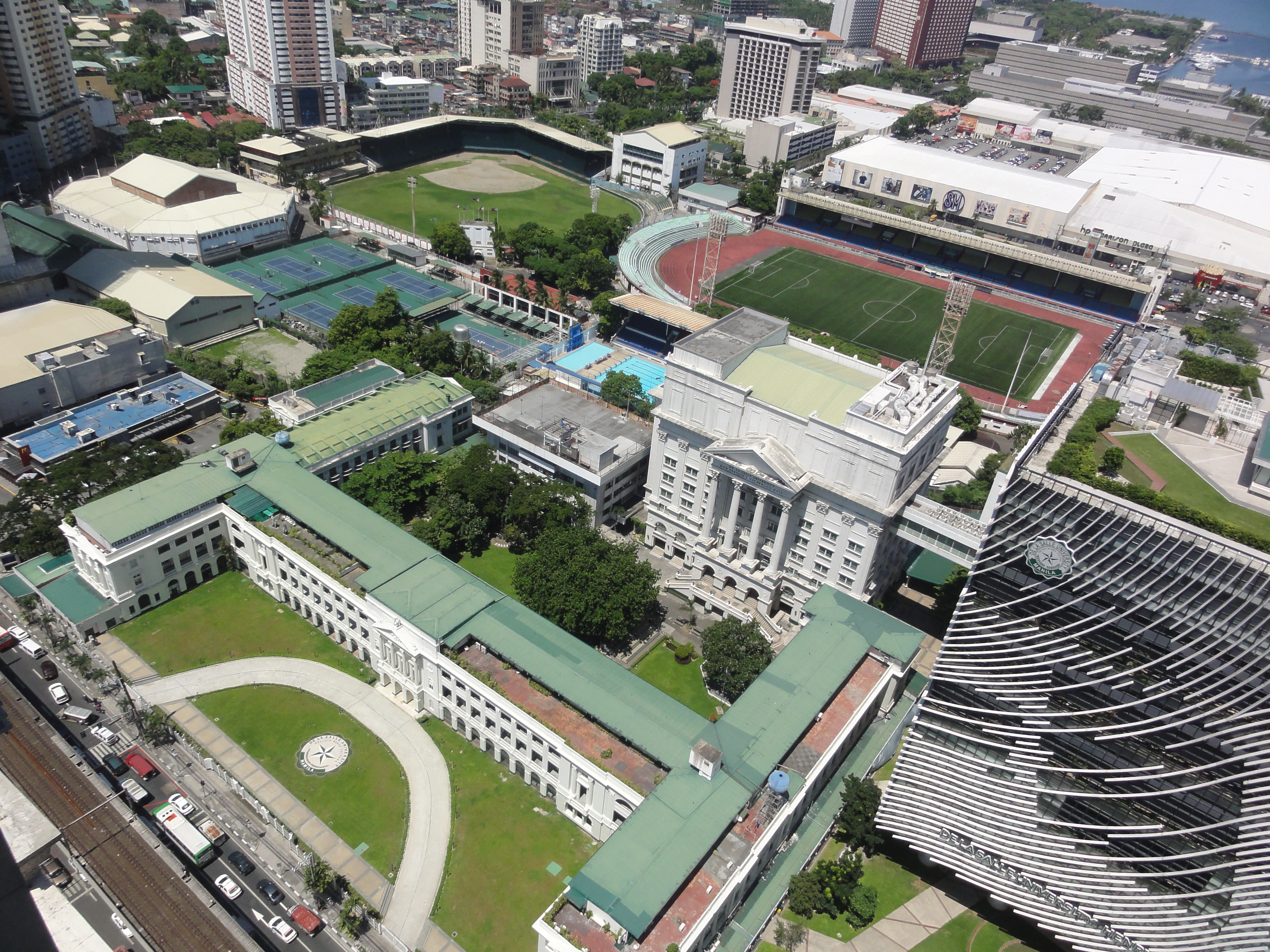
An aerial shot of the DLSU Manila Campus and the Rizal Memorial Sports Complex

In 2015, DLSU announced that it would open its Manila campus for senior high school students in response to the K–12 implementation. The Senior High School (SHS) classes officially opened on June 1, 2016. In December 2018, DLSU announced its plan to launch a new Learning Management System (LMS) called AnimoSpace, built based on the Canvas LMS software. AnimoSpace was officially launched on January 15, 2019.

In 2020, the university's I-Nano facility initiated a project on developing a Thermal Mechanical Garment (outer layer of a space suit) made from Abaca fiber. This is officially funded by the DOST and to be collaborated alongside the Technological University of the Philippines, FEATI University, Philippine Nuclear Research Institute, and the Philippine Textile Research Institute. In the same year, the university also won £200,000 (₱13.2 million) from the Newton Fund of the UK government for its research on the conversion of wastewater into nutrient-rich fertilizer for farming improvement.

Based on Scopus-indexed papers, De La Salle University was named the country's most productive research university in March 2020. In 2019, DLSU published over 600 Scopus-indexed publications, the most by any Philippine institution in a single calendar year. DLSU's publications account for almost 15% of the nation's research output. DLSU had 4,113 indexed publications in the database by June 2020, which was the second-highest number among Philippine higher education institutions (HEIs). According to Scopus' most recent citation database, DLSU's 2019 statistics were 729, keeping it as the country's top research institution.

In September 2024, a student from the university won the 2024 James Dyson Award in the Philippines for his underground monitoring system that provides real-time video feeds of the Earth's subsurface. In September 2025, three of the university's professors were included in Research.com's list of World's Best Scientists 2025 in their respective fields.
