= St. Joseph School – La Salle =

Roman Catholic school in Bacolod, Philippines

St. Joseph School-La Salle

Location
- Fr. Gratian Murray St., Villamonte, Bacolod, Negros Occidental, Philippines
- Coordinates: 10°40′14″N 122°57′58″E

Information
- Former name: St. Joseph High School (1960-2005)
- Type: Private, Catholic Lasallian coeducational secondary education institute
- Motto: Faithful Servants of the Community
- Religious affiliations: Roman Catholic (Christian Brothers)
- Established: 1960; 66 years ago
- Founder: Institute of the Brothers of the Christian Schools
- President: Br. Joaquin Severino Martinez FSC
- Staff: 99
- Grades: 7 to 10
- Enrollment: 1,574
- Campus: Urban, 1.3 hectares (13,000 m^{2})
- Colors: Green and white
- Nickname: SJS-LS Knights
- Hymn: De La Salle Alma Mater Hymn
- Website: Main Website www.sjslsbacolod.edu.ph; AIMS Website aims.usls.edu.ph/stjoseph/index.php
- SJS-LS Golden Jubilee Logo

St Joseph School-La Salle (SJS-LS) is a private, Catholic secondary education institution run by the Institute of the Brothers of the Christian Schools in Bacolod, Philippines. It was founded in 1960 by the De La Salle Brothers. It is the third of the third-generation La Salle schools founded by the De La Salle Brothers in the Philippines. These third-generation La Salle schools include: La Salle Academy-Iligan in Iligan, Lanao del Norte (1958), La Salle Green Hills in Mandaluyong, Metro Manila (1959), and De La Salle Lipa in Lipa City, Batangas (1962).

== History ==
=== Formation and early years ===
Named after Saint Joseph, St Joseph's High School (SJHS) was established in 1960 to provide a Catholic secondary school for the graduates of the Immaculate Conception Free School, a charitable primary school for young boys that were jointly run by the De La Salle Brothers in the Philippines and the Young Ladies' Association of Charity. Br. Francis Cody FSC sought the assistance of the benefactors of the Immaculate Conception Free School in the establishment of a De La Salle Secondary School. Adjoining with the Free School, a 1.3-hectare lot was donated by Alfredo Montelibano Sr. to the De La Salle Brothers.

The school opened with forty-five graduates of the Free School and charged minimal fees. Moreover, Bacolod's affluent families shouldered the cost of construction of the classrooms, library, science laboratories, work education building, as well as other financial needs. In the succeeding years, the school went on to accept graduates of both the Free School and the Barrio Obrero Elementary School. In 1966, the Brothers decided to open an adult night high school to serve the needs of adults who earned their income during the day but still wanted to pursue their education.

In the 1960s, when Negros Occidental suddenly faced a recession, the financial support that is being given to the Brothers decreased. This forced the Brothers to gradually phase out the Free School by 1971. The teachers, however, were retained to teach in the high school. In its first decades of operation, SJHS was imposing that parents would suggest the same kind of Christian education for their young girls. In that same year of 1971, the brothers deliberated on the matter where SJHS finally adopted a co-educational system. With this adoption, its population gently accelerated. In 1993, the school also embraced the Tuition Fee Categorization, with three categories to make their education more accessible. This was then further studied until the school year 2003–2004 where the school implemented the Socialized Tuition Scheme having a range of five categories.

=== Adoption of a new name ===
For the past few years, Saint Joseph's High School grew slowly because only a small number of funding agencies and foundations were aware of the fact that SJHS is one of the district schools of the De La Salle Brothers. It was then the school's stakeholders discussed changing the school's name to elicit its recognition. Thus, in the school year 2005–2006, St Joseph's High School formally adopted the name, St Joseph School-La Salle, to signify its full membership in the Lasallian family of district schools in the Philippines.

The word "high" was excluded from the school's new name because of the possibility of future developments such as the establishment of a grade school or other departments. The Brothers and the Board of Trustees have also been correcting the impression that the school would be charging higher tuition fees because of the inclusion of "La Salle" in its name.
