= La Salle University (Ozamiz) =

Roman Catholic university in Misamis Occidental, Philippines

La Salle University – Ozamiz, Inc.
- Pamantasang La Salle Ozamiz (Filipino)
- Former names: Immaculate Conception School (1929–1948); Immaculate Conception College (1948–1994); Immaculate Conception College – La Salle (1994–2006)
- Motto: Excellence and Service
- Type: Private, Catholic, research, non-stock, coeducational basic and higher education institution
- Established: 1929; 97 years ago
- Founders: Fr. Constancio Arsenio, OAR
- Religious affiliation: Roman Catholic (Christian Brothers)
- Academic affiliations: PAASCU; DLSP
- Chairman: Br. Edmundo Fernandez, FSC
- Chancellor: Dr. Wenny Caseros
- President: Br. Rey Erezare Mejias FSC EdD
- Vice-president: Rose Aimee Mangao (VP for Finance); Engr. Flor Neri - Cabang (VP for Administrative Services)
- Vice-Chancellor: Emma Suana EdD (Vice Chancellor for Academics & Research)
- Principal: Dr. Irene Eguico (Basic Education Unit)
- Dean: List: Catalina Maghamil (School of Graduate Studies); Michael Angelo Pagara (College of Tourism and Hospitality Management); Jackjun Caupayan (College of Teacher Education); Engr. Ramel Recentes (College of Computer Studies, Engineering and Architecture); Lowelle Pacot (College of Business and Accountancy); Benjiemen Labastin (College of Arts and Sciences)
- Administrative staff: 243
- Students: 5,041
- Location: La Salle St., Brgy Aguada, Ozamiz City, Misamis Occidental, Philippines; 8°08′56″N 123°50′47″E
- Campus: Main Campus, Basic Education Unit Campus, Gala Farm
- Alma Mater song: De La Salle Hymn
- Patron saint: St. Jean-Baptiste de La Salle
- Colors: Green - gold - White
- Nickname: Lasallian
- Website: www.lsu.edu.ph
- Location in Mindanao Location in the Philippines

La Salle University – Ozamiz, Inc. is a private Catholic Lasallian coeducational basic and higher education institution run by the Philippine District of the Christian Brothers in Ozamiz City, Misamis Occidental Philippines. It is a member of De La Salle Philippines, a network of Lasallian educational institutions within the Lasallian East Asia District.

It was formally opened in 1929 by the Society of Jesus as Immaculate Conception School (ICS) and later renamed Immaculate Conception College (ICC). The De La Salle Brothers took over the administration of the school in 1994 and renamed the school as Immaculate Conception College - La Salle (ICC-La Salle). It was granted university status in 2006 and was renamed La Salle University.

== History ==
The history of La Salle University dates back to the establishment of a parochial school in 1789 within the Parish of the Immaculate Conception. The school was established by the Recollect parish priest, Fr. Constancio Arsenio, OAR, with the first classes being the Cartilla, the Misterio, the Trisagio, and the Novena.

In 1929, as the Jesuit priests replaced the Recollects, Fr. Gabriel Font SJ formally established the Immaculate Conception School. Its first teachers were Mr. Juan Fuentes and his sister, Cirila and thirty students registered. In 1935, the government officially recognized the school's elementary program.

In 1939, the priests of the Missionary Society of St. Columban took over the administration from the Jesuits. Fr. Peter Fallon, SSC became the first Director of the Immaculate Conception School and that year witnessed the first graduation.

In 1941, the Columban Sisters were invited by Bishop James Hayes and the Columban Fathers to administer the school. The sisters then opened the high school department. However, World War II broke out and classes had to be discontinued and the old convent, which was used as a school building was converted into a Japanese headquarters.

After the war, classes were resumed and enrollment increased. For the first time, lay faculty members were employed and more Columban Sisters arrived. In 1948, the High School Department held its first Commencement Exercises and in June of that year, Mother Mary Theopane opened the college department with an enrollment of eighteen students.

In 1987, at the request of the Columban Sisters, Most Rev. Federico Escaler, S.J., D.D. became the President of Immaculate Conception College. In 1990, the De La Salle Brothers agreed to assist in the academic supervision of the school with Br. Martin Simpson FSC, as consultant. He was named President in 1993.

=== Turnover to the De La Salle Brothers ===
On May 17, 1994, the Columban Sisters formally turned over the College to the De La Salle Brothers. Dr. Emma Villaseran served as the acting President until March 31, 1995, under Br. Benildo Feliciano FSC, who was Chairman of the Board of Trustees. On April 1, 1995, Dr. Villaseran, assumed the position as President.

In 1995, the Philippine Accrediting Association of Schools, Colleges and Universities (PAASCU) accredited the College and was designated by the Commission on Higher Education as a Center of Excellence for Teacher Education in Region X.

On September 14, 2006, upon the establishment of De La Salle Philippines, the College officially became a District school. Br. Rey Erezare Mejias FSC is La Salle University's current President.

== Colleges ==
- College of Arts and Sciences
- College of Business and Accountancy
- College of Criminal Justice Education
- College of Teacher Education
- College of Computer Studies, Engineering and Architecture
- College of Tourism and Hospitality Management
- College of Nursing

== Basic Education Unit ==
- Pre-School (Playgroup, Nursery and Universal Kindergarten)
- Grade School (Grade 1 - 6)
- Junior High School(Grade 7 - 10)
- Senior High School (Grade 11 and 12)
- Tracks offered are:
  - Academic Track:
    - Science, Technology, Engineering and Mathematics (STEM)
    - Accountancy, Business, and Management (ABM)
    - Humanities and Social Sciences (HUMSS)

== School for the Deaf ==
- Lower Grades (Grade 1 - 6)
- Higher Grades (Grade 7 - 12)

== Radio station ==
The university has its own radio station, 94.5 LSU FM.
