= De La Salle Lipa College of Law =

Law school at De La Salle Lipa

Coordinates: 13.9416°N 121.1476°E

College of Law
- Established: 2010
- Dean: Atty. Ma. Isabel P. Romero
- Location: De La Salle Lipa, Lipa, Batangas

College of Law is the law school of De La Salle Lipa, a Lasallian educational institution located in Lipa City, Batangas, Philippines.

== History ==
The college started accepting applicants in Academic Year (AY) 2009-2010 and started its classes in AY 2010-2011 with the Juris Doctor program, a four-year professional degree. Originally, the college first offered the Bachelor of Laws degree in 2010, but efforts to enrich its curriculum were made such that the program was revised, changing into the Doctor of Jurisprudence program.
