= Jaime Hilario Integrated School – La Salle =

Roman Catholic school in Bataan, Philippines

Jaime Hilario Integrated School-La Salle

Location
- Sitio Looc, Brgy. Banawang; Bagac, Bataan; Philippines
- Coordinates: 14°37′39″N 120°22′03″E

Information
- Type: Private, non-stock, co-educational basic education institution
- Motto: Fides Servitium Committere (Latin); Faith Service Communion in Mission
- Religious affiliations: Roman Catholic (Christian Brothers)
- Established: 2006; 20 years ago
- Founder: Br. Edmundo Fernandez, FSC
- President: Br. Rey Erezare Mejias, FSC
- academic affiliations: DLSP
- Faculty: 26
- Enrollment: 447
- Campus: Rural; 3.5 hectares (35,000 m^{2})
- Patron saint: St.Br.Jaime Hilario Barbal, FSC
- Website: jhislasalle.edu.ph

Jaime Hilario Integrated School – La Salle is a Lasallian co-educational primary and secondary school located in Bagac, Bataan, in the Philippines. It was opened by the De La Salle Brothers in 2006 to cater to the farming and fishing community. It is the 16th school of De La Salle Philippines, a network of Lasallian schools in the Philippines.

== Opening ==
The school was formally opened on June 14, 2006, with three sections of Grade 1 students. Brother Bernard Oca FSC and Brother Manny Sia FSC each handle one section, along with lay teacher, Alan Paul S. Avelino. The school was also blessed by Bishop Socrates Villegas of Balanga, Bataan on the same day, and was followed by a short program and meal. The event was attended by about 200 Brothers, donors, Lasallian partners, local government officials, and the students and their parents.

== Patron saint ==
The school is named after Saint Brother Jaime Hilario Barbal FSC, a Catalan Spanish Lasallian Brother who was forced to give up teaching because of his failed hearing. Afterwards, he began work in the garden at the Brothers' House at San Jose in Tarragona, Spain.

In July 1936, during the Spanish Civil War, Br. Jaime was imprisoned at Mollerosa in Zaragoza, Spain for being a religious. In December of the same year, he was transferred to Tarragona and was then confined on a prison ship. On January 15, 1937, he was convicted of being a Christian brother. On January 18, Br. Jaime was shot to death at the Mount of Olives cemetery near Tarragona. Since the soldiers were ordered by their commander to shoot wide, their two volleys did not kill Br. Jaime; he was murdered when the commander shot him five times at close range. Br. Jaime was the first of the 97 Lasallian Brothers who had died in Catalonia during the Spanish Civil War to be recognized as a martyr.

He was beatified by Pope John Paul II on April 29, 1990, and subsequently canonized on November 21, 1999.

== Academics ==
The Integrated School offers both primary and secondary education and integrates agriculture and fishery, which are the main sources of livelihood of the local folk, into the curricula. The school's curricula also aims to instill concern and consciousness for their community and the environment. The school charges an annual tuition of Php 500.

The school also provides the students with uniforms, school supplies, a shuttle service, and food during recess. The school plans to add one grade level each year until the school offers a complete grade school and high school by SY 2015–2016.

== Campus ==
The campus is situated on a 3.5-hectare lot, which was donated by De La Salle alumnus Ambassador Carlos J. Valdes (DLSU BSC 1940), and is located 151 kilometers northwest of Manila. Once fully completed, the campus will feature a school chapel, a school canteen, sports facilities, and modern classrooms.
