= De La Salle John Bosco College =

Roman Catholic college in Surigao del Sur, Philippines

- Kolehiyong De La Salle John Bosco (Filipino)
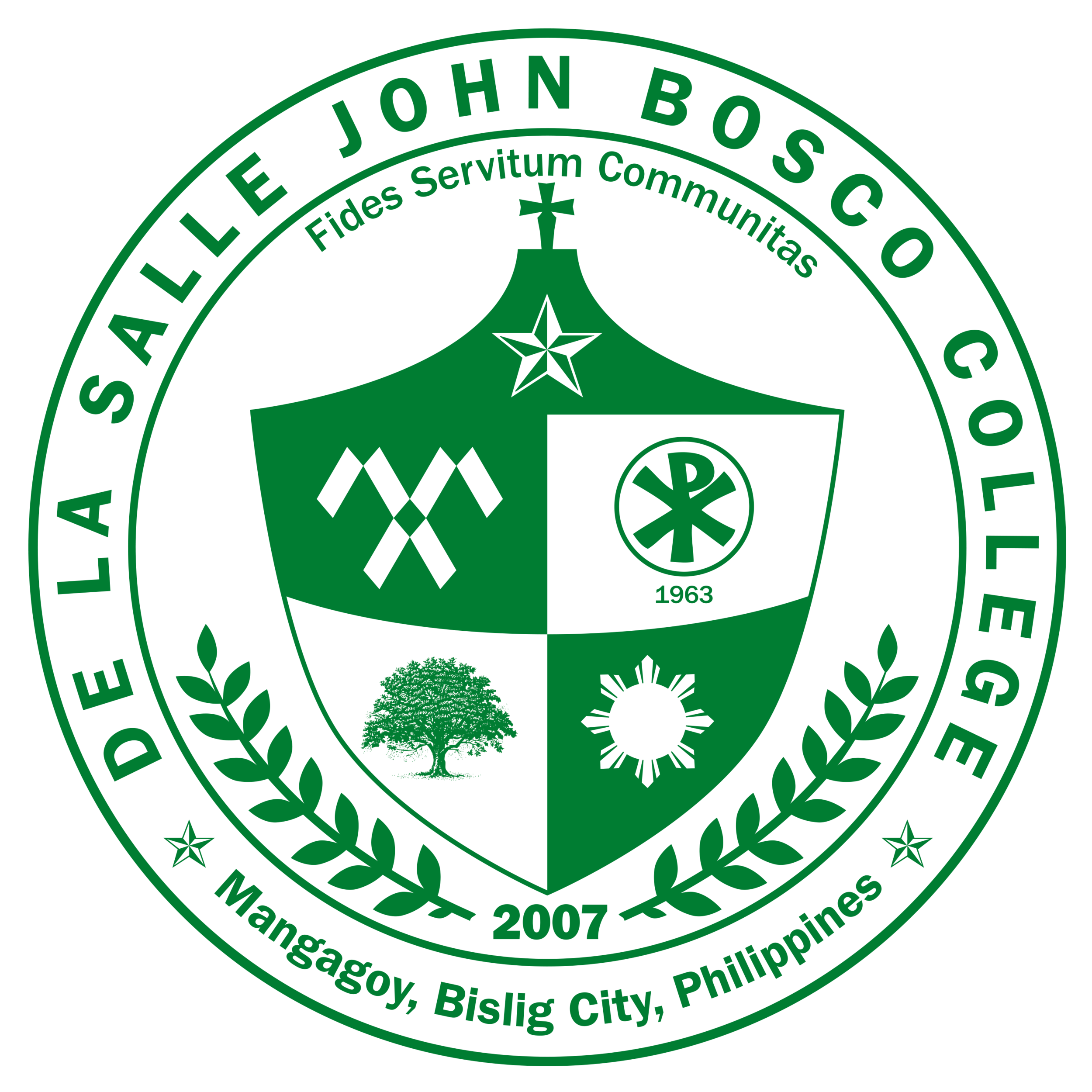
- Sustaining the Culture of Excellence
- Former names: St. John Bosco Technical High School (1963–1969); John Bosco School (1969–1999); John Bosco College (1999–2007)
- Motto: Fides Servitum Communitas
- Motto in English: Faith Service Community
- Type: Private, Catholic, non-stock, coeducational basic and higher education institution
- Established: 1963; 63 years ago* 2007**
- Affiliations: Roman Catholic, Lasallian
- President: Br. Rey Erezare Mejias FSC, EdD
- Administrative staff: 147
- Students: 2,769
- Location: La Salle Drive, John Bosco District, Brgy. Mangagoy, Bislig, Surigao del Sur, Philippines; 8°10′50″N 126°21′15″E
- Campus: Single campus, urban
- Hymn: The DLSJBC Alma Mater Song; The De La Salle Hymn
- Patron saints: St. Jean-Baptiste de La Salle
- Colors: Green and white
- Website: www.dlsjbc.edu.ph
- Location in Mindanao Location in the Philippines
- Footnotes: * As St. John Bosco Technical High School ** As De La Salle John Bosco College

The De La Salle John Bosco College (DLSJBC) is a PAASCU-accredited Lasallian district school located in Mangagoy, Bislig, Surigao del Sur in the Philippines. Established in 1963 by the Don Bosco Fathers, the administration and supervision of the institution was formally turned over to the De La Salle Brothers in 1977.

DLSJBC offers complete pre-school, basic education (grade school and junior high school), senior high school, college, and TESDA-accredited TVET courses.

== Brief history ==
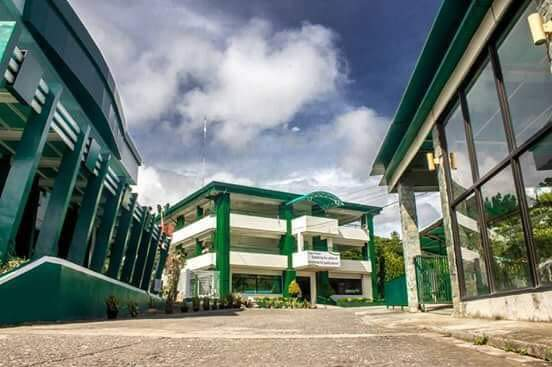
Entrance to De La Salle John Bosco College

DLSJBC's foundation could be traced back as the Bislig Bay Elementary School was initially founded in the mid-'50s, established exclusively for the dependents of the Bislig Bay Lumber Company Incorporated (BBLCI - the forerunners of the Paper Industries Corporation of the Philippines or PICOP which was one of the biggest paper mill companies in Asia that time). In 1961, the company turned over the management of the school to Fr. Alberto Grol, then-parish priest of Brgy. Mangagoy in Bislig, after the permission of Msgr. Charles Van den Ouewelant. Fr. Grol then converted the Bislig Bay Elementary School into a parochial school that allowed access of non-company dependents.

Later on in the years 1962–63, the parochial school was converted into an elementary school for girls under the name St. Margaret Mary School managed by the Augustinian Recollect Missionary Sisters (ARM). Fr. Grol then envisioned the establishment of a school for boys with the blessing of the Bishop and the financial assistance of Don Andres Soriano (co-owner of BBLCI) who readily accepted the idea on the condition that the proposed boys' high school would be put up in Brgy. Mangagoy, near where the BBLI of the Andres Soriano Corporation was located. About the same time, the Don Bosco School in Mandaluyong was supposedly planning for a pattern school in Davao City. Negotiations went fast and in 1963, the Salesian Fathers of Don Bosco agreed to manage the school and the company committed to subsidize its operations with the focus on training young males who could answer the increasing demand for skilled workers at the company.

In 1964, a number of teachers from Don Bosco Mandaluyong assigned in Mangagoy became the pioneering staff of the St. John Bosco Technical High School. The school was located at the former parish convent in Mangagoy and used part of the church as classrooms. Fr. Grol was then replaced by Fr. Henry Raam, MSC, under whom the school became the recipient of the United Nations’ “Tools for Freedom”. At the same year, the St. Margaret Mary School also opened its High School Department for girls. In 1967, St. John Bosco Technical High School and St. Margaret Mary School's first batch of high school students graduated. Meanwhile, in 1968, the Augustinian Recollect Missionary Sisters' contract to manage the school expired, and the Maryknoll Sisters were invited to take over the management of St. Margaret Mary School. The following year (1969), High School girls of nearby St. Margaret Mary School were transferred and merged with St. John Bosco Technical High School, thus making it a co-educational institution. After the merging was completed, it was renamed as the John Bosco School (JBS) and was permanently transferred to its present location in La Salle Drive, John Bosco District, Barangay Mangagoy. Sister Blaise Lupo then took over the directorship in 1970.

In 1974, the Jose Maria Soriano - Learning Center (JMS-LC), a La Salle-Supervised school in Brgy. Coleto, also in Bislig, was established by PICOP (then BBLI) for the benefit of the children of the company employees living in Forest Drive Village which is 13 kilometers away from the company. The school was then provided a Brother-Supervisor. Br. Thomas "Tom" Cannon, FSC was assigned as the first school director.

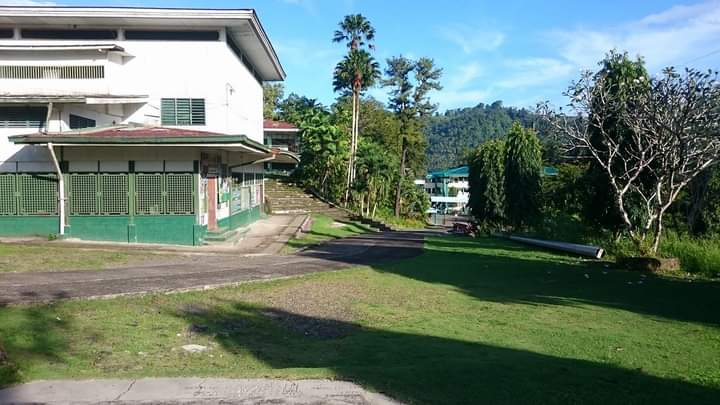
De La Salle John Bosco College, Junior High School Department

In 1977, as the Don Bosco Fathers were slowly departing, the last batch of the Maryknoll Sisters also left Bislig and the administration and supervision of John Bosco School was formally turned over to the De La Salle Brothers. Br. Tom Cannon also became the Brother-Supervisor both in JBS and JMS-LC. In 1982, by the supervision of Br. Mifrando Obach, FSC (who replaced Br. Cannon), John Bosco School and the Jose M. Soriano - Learning Center were merged thus making it a school with 2 campuses, the Main campus located in Mangagoy and the JMS-LC campus located in Coleto, still bearing the name John Bosco School.

In 1997, PICOP Resources, Inc. (PRI) withdrew its financial assistance to the school and the JMS-LC was later phased out and all of its operations were transferred to JBS Main campus. Also in that year, JBS pre-school department was completed with the addition of a nursery level. JMS-LC was then converted into the St. Br. Miguel Retreat and Training Center to serve as venue for recollections and trainings, and workshops not only for the school, but also for interested users in the local community.

In 1999, John Bosco School became John Bosco College (JBC) with the opening of its College Department. Starting from that year onwards, JBC was accredited by the La Salle Schools Supervision Office and in 2006, the school was officially accepted as a District School of De La Salle Philippines. With Mrs. Bro. Ophelia S. Fugoso, AFSC as the School President and Bro. Narciso "Jun" Erguiza, FSC as the LaSallian Brother consultant, the acceptance ceremony was done in February 2007 making it the 18th district school of the De La Salle Philippines at the time thus renaming it to its present name, De La Salle John Bosco College. The school's current president is Mrs. Aristarco "Restie" A. Ugmad, PhD, who succeeded Mr. Pablo "Jun" N. Jordan, Jr., PhD.

== School seal (Old) ==
Seal of the John Bosco College

- The white shield with a tower and cross symbolizes the school's being a Catholic institution.
- The Chi-Rho in the upper corner of the crest is the sign of peace.
- The gold star is the De La Salle Brothers' Signum Fidei or Star of Faith.
- Three broken chevrons on the white shield signify St. John Baptist De La Salle, founder of the Institute of the Brothers of the Christian Schools.
