= De La Salle Andres Soriano Memorial College =

Roman Catholic college in Cebu, Philippines

De La Salle Andrés Soriano Memorial College
- Motto: Ad Deum Per Fidem, Mores, Cultura (Latin)
- Motto in English: To God Through Faith, Morals, and Culture
- Type: Private, Catholic, non-stock, coeducational basic and higher education institution
- Established: 1965; 61 years ago
- Religious affiliation: Roman Catholic (Christian Brothers)
- President: Ma. Donitha C. Hernando
- Administrative staff: 70+
- Students: 1,600+
- Location: Lutopan, Toledo City, Cebu, Philippines; 10°18′36″N 123°42′37″E
- Campus: 6.9 hectares (69,000 m^{2})
- Location in Visayas Location in the Philippines

The De La Salle Andrés Soriano Memorial College, also known by its acronym DLSASMC, is a private Catholic Lasallian basic and higher education institution run by the De La Salle Brothers of the Philippine District of the Christian Brothers in Lutopan, Toledo, Cebu, Philippines. It was opened in 1965. The college campus occupies 6.9 hectares. The institution is named in memory of Andrés Soriano, Sr., a prominent Filipino businessman.

== History ==
The Andrés Soriano Memorial College was established as a school at the request of the Soriano family, on behalf of the Atlas Consolidated Mining Development Corporation, to Br. Philip Nelan FSC, who was then the Sub-Provincial of the Philippine Sub-District. It was opened in 1965 (ASMC - La Salle was named or known before as Andrés Soriano Memorial School - La Salle or ASMS - La Salle).

Since its establishment, the De La Salle Brothers have supervised the school through formal contracts and contacts or through its Board of Trustees. By an act of the District Council of the De La Salle Brothers in the Philippines in 1995, the school became a District Affiliate School.

In 2000, the school was granted college status by the Commission on Higher Education and in 2004, the Brothers community at La Salle Green Hills adopted it as its outreach school. On July 3, 2006, by a decision of the District Council and the National Mission Council of De La Salle Philippines, the ASMC was accepted as a District School. The ceremony of acceptance took place on the campus and was witnessed by its students, faculty, staff, parents, alumni, and personnel of the Atlas Consolidated Mining and Development Corporation.

Lutopan as the place is commonly known, lives by its official name as Bry. Don Andrés Soriano (DAS), Toledo City.
