= De La Salle Araneta University =

Roman Catholic university in Malabon, Philippines

- Pamantasang De La Salle Araneta (Filipino)
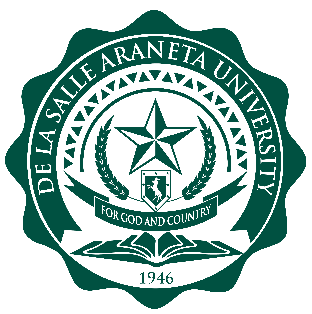
- 2018-current De La Salle logo
- Other names: Araneta U, DLSAU
- Former names: Araneta Institute of Agriculture (1946–1958); Gregorio Araneta University (1958–1978); Gregorio Araneta University Foundation (1978–2002)
- Motto: For God and Country
- Type: Private, Roman Catholic, research, non-stock, coeducational basic and higher education institution
- Established: 1946; 80 years ago
- Religious affiliation: Roman Catholic (De La Salle Brothers)
- Academic affiliations: ASEACCU ACAP NAASCU PVMA DLSP CEAP PACU IALU
- Chairperson: Carmelita I. Quebengco AFSC
- Chancellor: Marie Allison Parpan
- President: Bernard S. Oca, FSC
- Vice-president: Paul Zaldarriaga (VP for Finance) Christopher Polanco (VP for Advancement, Linkages & Special Projects)
- Vice-Chancellor: Jennifer Reyes (VC for Academics & Research)
- Administrative staff: 318
- Students: 3,849
- Location: Victoneta Avenue, Potrero, Malabon, Metro Manila, Philippines; 14°40′17″N 120°59′55″E
- Alma Mater song: Alma Mater Hymn
- Patron Saint: Saint Jean-Baptiste de La Salle, FSC
- Colors: Green & white
- Website: www.dlsau.edu.ph
- Location in Metro Manila Location in Luzon Location in the Philippines

De La Salle Araneta University, also referred to as Araneta U, DLSU-A, DLSAU, is a private Catholic Lasallian co-educational basic and higher education institution supervised by the Philippine District of the De La Salle Christian Brothers in Malabon, Metro Manila, Philippines. It was established in 1946 in Bulacan and named Araneta Institute of Agriculture. It was then transferred to Malabon the year after. In 1978 it was renamed the Gregorio Araneta University Foundation. Integration of the university with the DLS System started in 1987 until 2002 when it officially became a member of the system. It is the fifth university in the De La Salle schools network. The university specializes in Veterinary Medicine and Agricultural Sciences. It is a member of De La Salle Philippines, a network of several Lasallian educational institutions within the Lasallian East Asia District.

== Departments ==
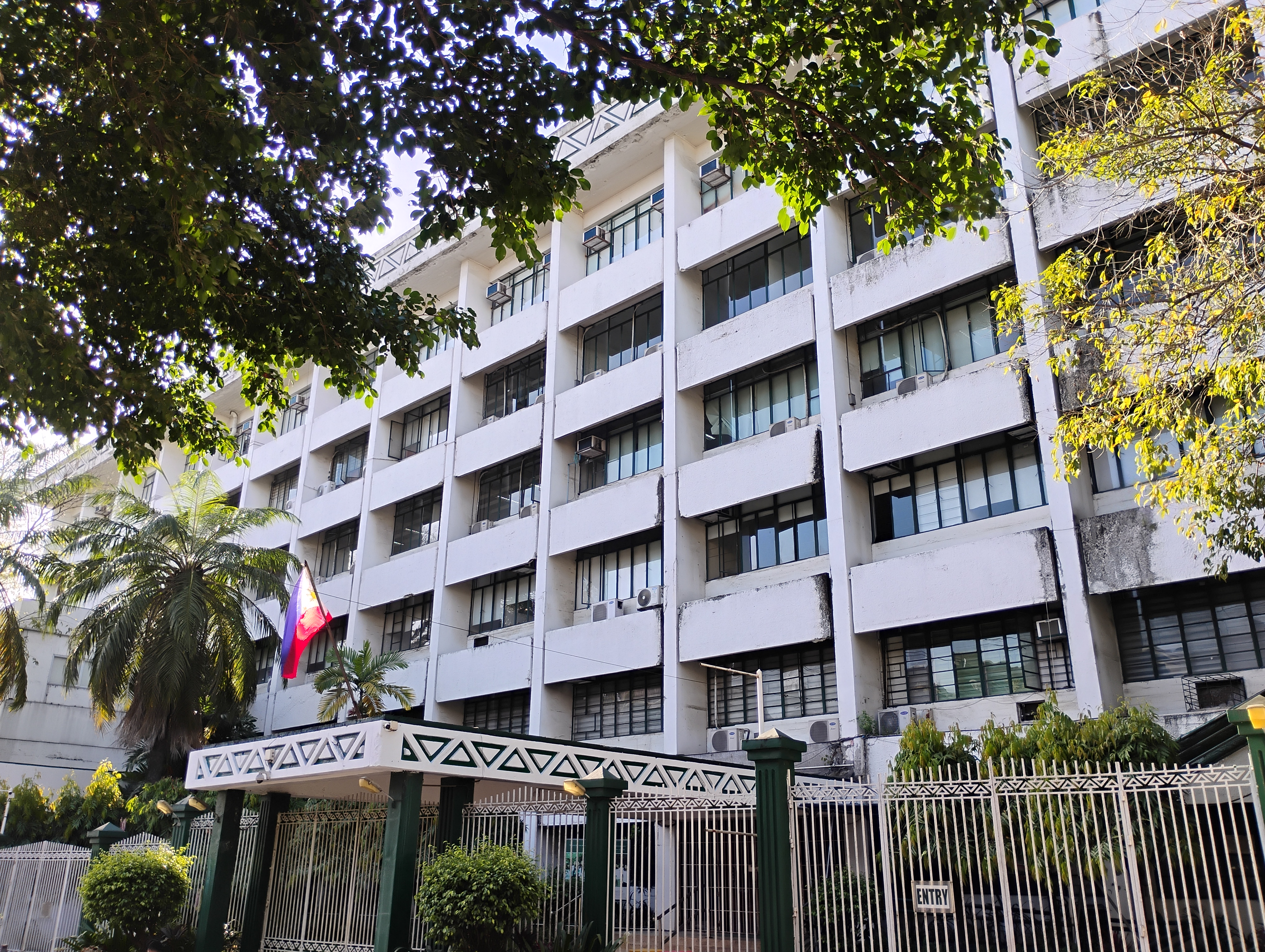
DLSAU Life Science Building

DLSAU has a basic education department (elementary school and high school), a college and a graduate school department. The College Department offers programs in veterinary medicine, agriculture, forestry, business, hotel and restaurant management, travel tourism management, accountancy, psychology, computer science and education while the graduate school confers the following master's degrees: Master of Arts in education, and Master in management. The university also offers doctoral degree programs in philosophy.

In June 2011, the De La Salle Agrivet Sciences Institute, located in Bulacan, was established as a satellite campus under the leadership of Br. Narciso S. Erguiza Jr. FSC. Its purpose is to be a demonstration site for the university's food, and agriculture science-related programs.

== Athletics ==
De La Salle Araneta University has several varsity teams competing in various sports activities such as basketball, football, volleyball, athletics, badminton, swimming, table tennis, and taekwondo bringing 3 gold, 2 silver and 1 bronze (by december 8).

== Notable alumni ==
- Sharmaine Arnaiz, actress (2007)
- Jose Concepcion Jr., industrialist, NAMFREL chair, and Secretary of Trade and Industry
- Chelsea Manalo, Miss Universe Philippines titleholder
