= De La Salle Philippines =

Network of Lasallian educational institutions in the Philippines

- Former name: De La Salle University System (1987–2005)
- Motto: Indivisa Manent - Permanently Indivisible - Remain United - One La Salle
- Established: 2006 De La Salle Philippines
- Affiliations: Roman Catholic, Lasallian
- President: Br. Bernard S. Oca, FSC
- Administrative staff: 8,141
- Students: 91,515
- Location: Central House, La Salle Green Hills, Mandaluyong, Metro Manila, Philippines
- Campus: 16 educational institutions in Luzon, Visayas, and Mindanao
- Website: www.delasalle.ph

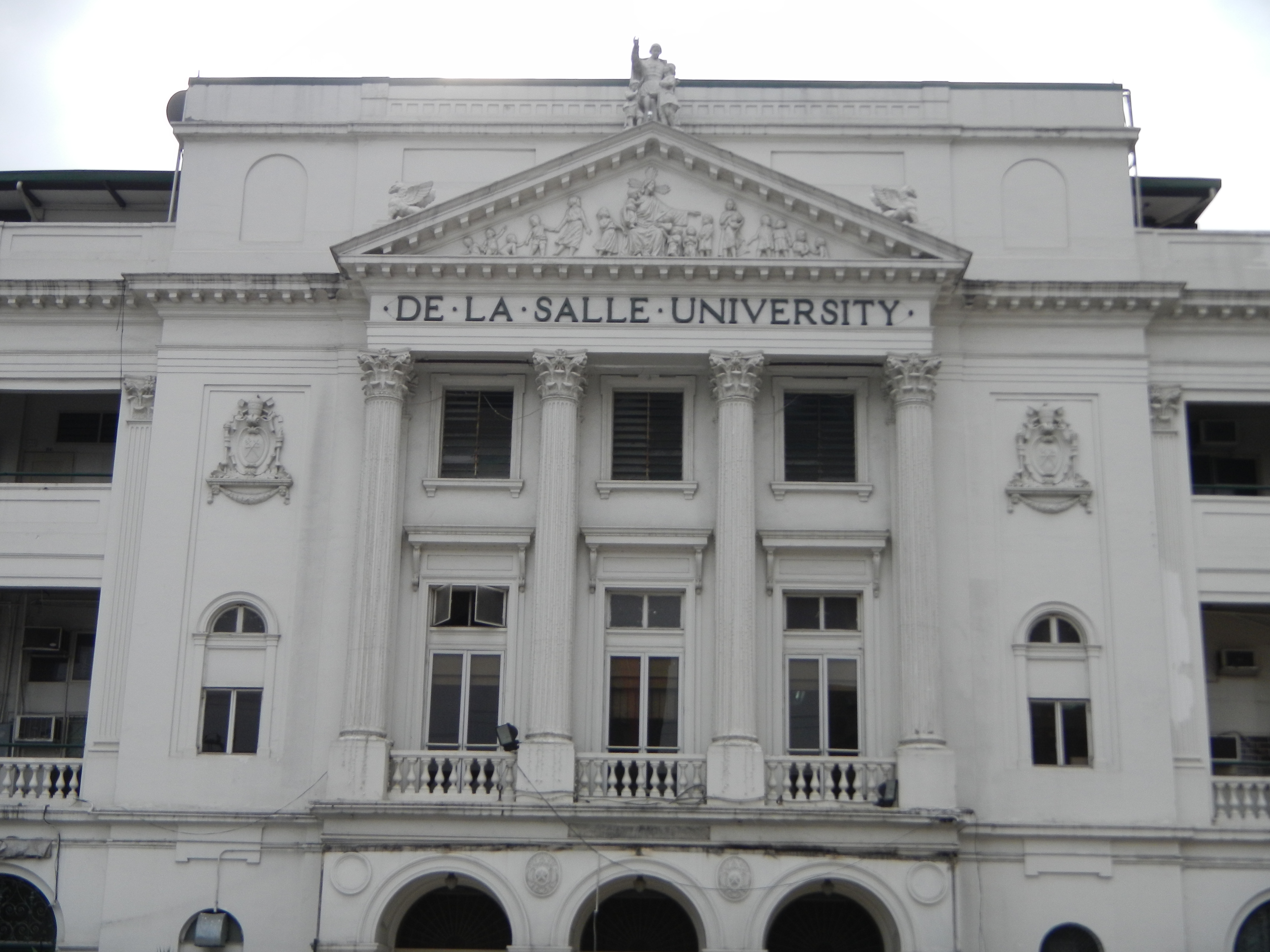
De La Salle University, the oldest constituent

De La Salle-College of Saint Benilde

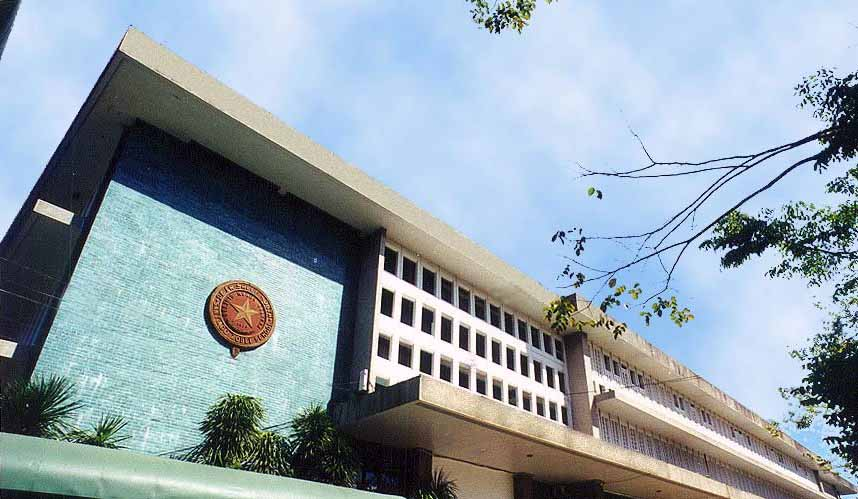
De La Salle Santiago Zobel School

Medical and Health Sciences Institute

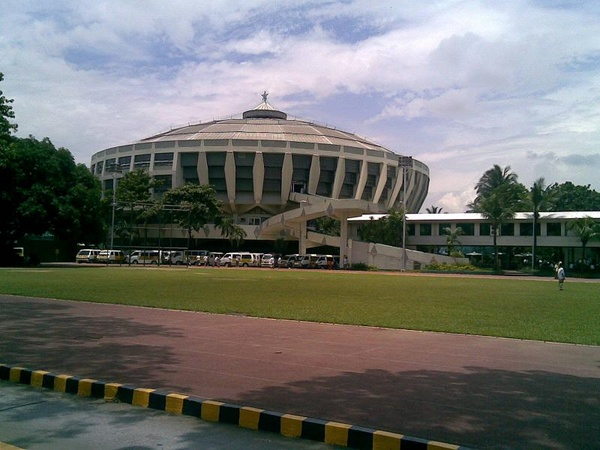
La Salle Green Hills

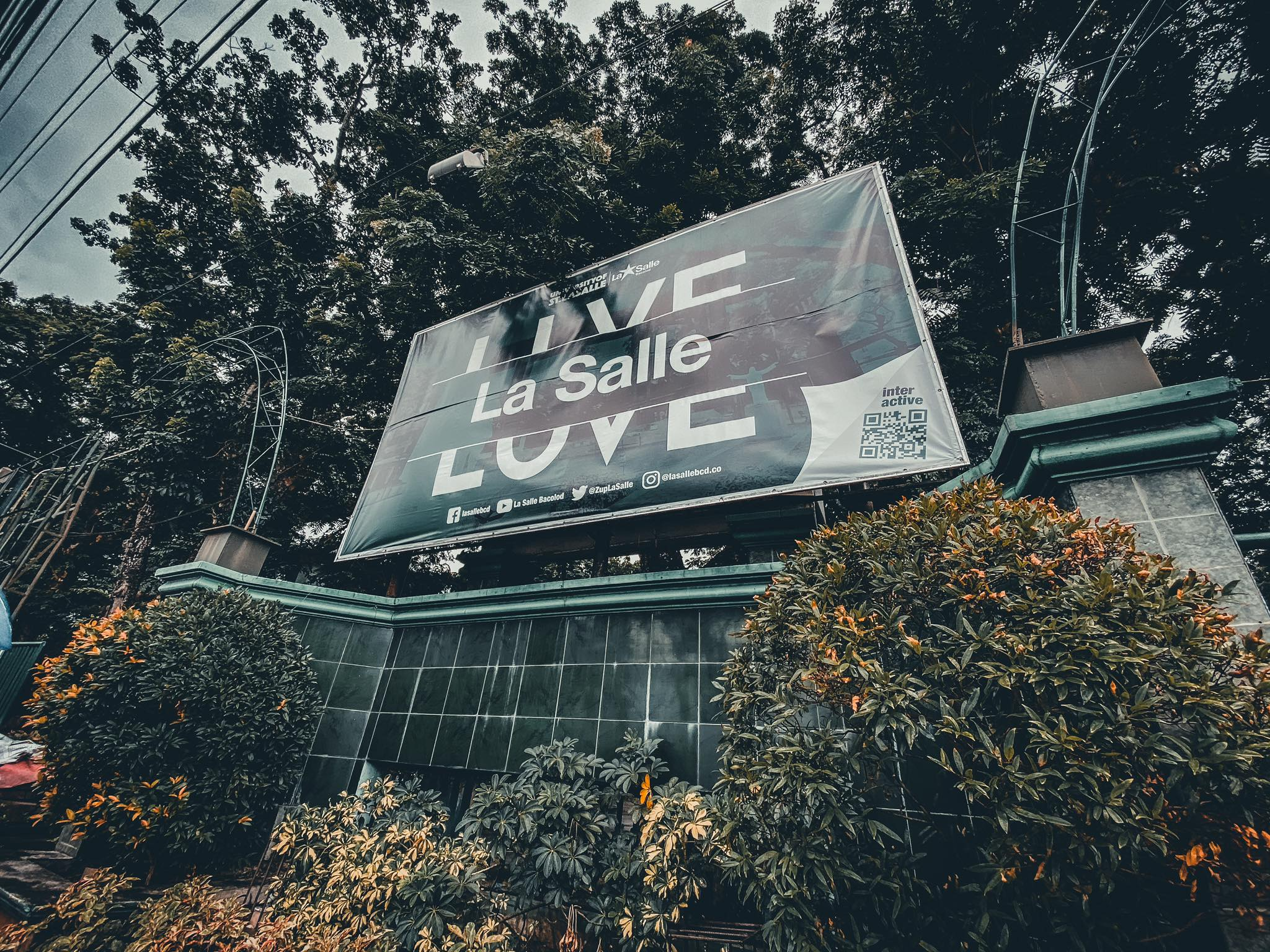
University of St. La Salle

De La Salle Philippines (DLSP) (incorporated as De La Salle Philippines, Inc), established in 2006, is a network of Lasallian educational institutions within the Lasallian East Asia District established to facilitate collaboration. There are currently sixteen Lasallian Educational Institutions in the Philippines. De La Salle Philippines replaced the De La Salle University System which was established under the presidency of Br. Andrew Gonzalez FSC in 1987 as a response to the rapid expansion of Lasallian educational institutions nationwide. De La Salle Philippines is a member of a network of over 1,100 Lasallian educational institutions in 80 countries.

The network holds various projects that improve educational communities for the youth, especially to those who are poor. Among these are the software training for indigenous peoples and the exhibit on people killed during the Philippine government's operations against illegal drugs.

== Historical background ==
=== Early history ===
The history of Lasallian education in the Philippines dates back to 1905 when the then Archbishop of Manila, Jeremiah James Harty, an alumnus of a La Salle educational institution in the U.S., appealed to the Superior General of the Institute of the Brothers of the Christian Schools (Fratres Scholarum Christianarum) - FSC for the establishment of a De La Salle educational institution in the Philippines due to the very small number of Catholic institutions at that time. Archbishop Harty's request was rejected at first due to lack of funds. However, he would continue to appeal to Pope Pius X for the establishment of additional Catholic educational institutions in the country.

From March to June 1911, nine De La Salle Christian Brothers from Europe and the United States, led by Brother Blimond Pierre FSC of France arrived in the Philippines. Together on June 16, 1911, the Brothers established the first Christian Brother educational institution in the Philippines, De La Salle College, on Calle Nozaleda (now General Luna St.) in Paco, Manila.

Because of the increasing student population, the Brothers transferred the educational institution to its present location on Taft Avenue in the Malate district of Manila in 1921.

=== De La Salle University System ===
Seal of the De La Salle University System

During the 1980s, then President of De La Salle University, the late Brother Andrew Gonzalez FSC, Ph.D. introduced the idea of a multiversity because of the growing number of Lasallian institutions nationwide. His vision was to establish a system where the resources could be utilized to create a greater impact. The De La Salle University System was created in 1987, composed of De La Salle University Manila, De La Salle Santiago Zobel School, and the newly acquired De La Salle University-Dasmariñas and De La Salle Medical and Health Sciences Institute in Dasmariñas, Cavite. A year later, the newly established De La Salle-College of Saint Benilde in Malate, Manila, was included in the system.

De La Salle University Manila initially provided the resources and expertise needed in the establishment of these institutions, where it extended financial assistance and human resources in building the other campuses. The first general assembly of administrators and their representatives from the five campuses was convened in 1992 to support and facilitate the establishment of the system. Several committees were formed during the convention to innovate and improve programs and structures among the campuses. A task force to study the different needs of the campuses was formed in 1994. It was also during this year that an organizational structure was formed and a vision and mission statement was created for the system.

In 1995, a 50-hectare property in Biñan was acquired by the System from the family of the late National Artist of the Philippines for Architecture and La Salle High School alumnus Leandro Locsin to be used as the site of De La Salle University-Canlubang, a science and technology-oriented campus. Construction of the first building of the campus as well as start of operations both began in 2003. De La Salle University-Professional Schools, Inc., established in 1960, became a semi-autonomous entity in 1996 working within the campus of De La Salle University Manila. In 2002, the management and ownership of the Gregorio Araneta University Foundation in Malabon was transferred by the Araneta Family to the system and was renamed De La Salle Araneta University, becoming the eighth member of the system.

=== Establishment of De La Salle Philippines, Inc. ===
In 2006, the 8-campus De La Salle University System was abolished and in its place the 17-campus De La Salle Philippines, Inc. was established in order to have a more focused and unified implementation of the Lasallian Mission, generate greater and more creative synergy among Lasallian educational institutions, improve the overall quality of Lasallian education in the country and promote the spirit of “One La Salle” with a common vision of educating the Filipino youth. Ten more Lasallian institutions throughout the country were integrated into the eight campuses of the DLSU System, bringing the total number of campuses to eighteen. Since then, De La Salle-Professional Schools, Inc. and De La Salle Canlubang were integrated into De La Salle University which brought back the number of educational institutions to sixteen.

== Network administration ==
The network administration is composed of a National Mission Council (NMC) which includes eight De La Salle Brothers including the Brother Visitor and seven Lasallian Partners elected by corporate members; DLSP Corporate Members which includes all incumbent trustees of the La Salle educational institutions as well as the Lasallian Educational Corporations; and the DLSP President which acts as the Chief Mission Officer and Chief Executive Officer of the National Mission Council.

The National Mission Council (NMC) serves as the Board of Trustees of DLSP. As the highest policy-making body of the network, it accompanies school boards and school heads in following the Lasallian Mission. The NMC also provides assistance with regard to financial matters such as fundraising for scholarships or social projects.

== La Salle Educational Institutions in the Philippines ==
The network was originally composed of eighteen La Salle educational institutions. Two De La Salle Supervised Schools, Andres Soriano Memorial College located in Toledo, Cebu and John Bosco College located in Bislig, Surigao del Sur (both added in 2006), becoming the 17th and 18th La Salle Schools respectively. In 2008, the De La Salle Professional Schools was re-integrated back to De La Salle University. In 2012, De La Salle Canlubang was officially merged with De La Salle University to become the De La Salle University Science and Technology Complex, bringing the number of La Salle educational institutions in the Philippines down to sixteen. The schools provide a diverse range of education ranging from Basic Education up to Graduate Studies. It consists of six universities, six colleges (with five providing basic education), four basic education granting schools, and two stand-alone high schools.

School	Location	Established	Notes
De La Salle Andres Soriano Memorial College; President: Dr. Genesa P. Paragados	Toledo, Cebu	1965	
De La Salle Araneta University; President: Br. Bernard S. Oca FSC; Chancellor: Dr. Marie Allison Parpan	Malabon, Metro Manila	1946	
De La Salle-College of Saint Benilde; President: Br. Edmundo Fernandez, FSC Chancellor: Benhur A. Ong	Malate, Manila	1988	
De La Salle Medical and Health Sciences Institute; President: Antonio B. Ramos, MD, FPCS, FPATACSI, MBA	Dasmariñas, Cavite	1979	Medical school of the De La Salle University
De La Salle John Bosco College; President: Mrs. Aristarco A. Ugmad, PhD	Bislig, Surigao del Sur	1963	Initially started with St. Margaret Mary's School (former Bislig Bay Elementary School) established in 1950 but later merged with St. John Bosco Technical High School which was established in 1963 to become John Bosco School (JBS). JBS was then renamed De La Salle John Bosco College in 2007.
De La Salle Lipa; President and Chancellor: Br. Dante Amisola FSC	Lipa City, Batangas	1962	
De La Salle Santiago Zobel School; President: Br. Bernard Oca FSC	Muntinlupa, Metro Manila	1978	
De La Salle University-Dasmariñas; President: Br. Francisco “Sockie” dela Rosa VI FSC	Dasmariñas, Cavite	1987	Largest De La Salle Campus in the Philippines
De La Salle University; President and Chancellor: Br. Bernard S. Oca FSC	Malate, Manila	1911	Oldest constituent of the De La Salle Philippines
De La Salle University - Laguna Campus; Vice-President: Dr. Julius B. Maridable	Biñan, Laguna	2003	Originally known as De La Salle Canlubang established in 2003; later integrated to DLSU in 2012 to become a satellite campus and renamed De La Salle University Science and Technology Complex (or De La Salle University Leandro V. Locsin Campus); later renamed to De La Salle University - Laguna Campus.
Jaime Hilario Integrated School-La Salle; Director/Principal: Br. Inigo Riola FSC	Bagac, Bataan	2006	
La Salle Academy; President: Br. Antonio Cesar Servando FSC	Iligan City, Lanao del Norte	1958	
La Salle College Antipolo; President: Br. Victor Franco FSC	Antipolo, Rizal	1985	
La Salle Green Hills; President: Br. Edmundo L. Fernandez FSC	Mandaluyong, Metro Manila	1959	
La Salle University Ozamiz; President: Br. Rey Erezare Mejias FSC	Ozamiz City, Misamis Occidental	1929	
St. Joseph School-La Salle; President-Principal: Br. Emmanuel Hilado FSC	Bacolod, Negros Occidental	1960	
University of St. La Salle; President and Chancellor: Br. Joaquin Martinez FSC	Bacolod, Negros Occidental	1952	

== Timeline of presidents ==
Source:

== See also ==
- History of De La Salle University
- De La Salle Brothers Philippine District
