= Jaime Hilario Barbal =

Spanish Catholic martyr & saint (1898–1937)

Saint Jaime Hilario Barbal F.S.C.
- Born: 2 January 1898; Enviny, Lleida, Kingdom of Spain
- Died: 18 January 1937 (aged 39); La Oliva, Tarragona, Second Spanish Republic
- Venerated in: Roman Catholic Church
- Beatified: 29 April 1990, Saint Peter's Square, Vatican City by Pope John Paul II
- Canonized: 21 November 1999, Saint Peter's Square, Vatican City by Pope John Paul II
- Feast: 18 January

Jaime Hilario Barbal, FSC (born Manuel Barbal i Cosán; 2 January 1898 – 18 January 1937) was a Spanish Catholic and professed Brother of the Christian Schools. He served for almost two decades as a teacher in the schools that his order managed until being caught up in the turmoil of the Spanish Civil War, which saw the forces of the Second Spanish Republic execute him.

His beatification was celebrated on 29 April 1990 after it was confirmed that Barbal was killed in odium fidei ("in hatred of the faith"). The confirmation of a miracle attributed to his intercession allowed for Pope John Paul II to canonize him as a saint of the Catholic Church on 21 November 1999.

== Life ==
Manuel Barbal i Cosán was born in Lleida.

He began his ecclesiastical studies at a religious school where seminarians were educated in 1911 for the Diocese of Urgel. But he soon developed hearing problems and was forced to withdraw from the institute and could not pursue a path to the priesthood as he had intended. In 1917 he entered the novitiate of the Institute of the Brothers of the Christian Schools in Irun where he was given the religious name of "Jaime Hilario" and the habit on 24 February. Until 1933 he was sent on various teaching assignments and was regarded as an exceptional teacher and catechist; he taught Latin and was a believer in universal education with an emphasis on the poor. His hearing problems continued to persist and worsen and, at the beginning of the 1930s, he was forced to stop teaching and began work as a gardener at the college of Saint Joseph in Tarragona.

The outbreak of the civil war in mid-1936 while traveling to visit his relations saw him arrested for being a member of a religious congregation. In December 1936, he was transferred to the prison ship Mahon at Tarragona. Although he could have claimed that he was a gardener, he insisted that he was a religious brother and, on 15 January 1937, he was tried and convicted for being a member of the De La Salle Brothers. In his trial, his defense advocate told him to cite his occupation as a gardener, but he refused to do so and said he would claim to be a religious brother, as was the case.

Barbal was taken to Monte de los Olivos – an olive grove – in Tarragona for execution during the afternoon of 18 January 1937. When the first two salvos from the firing squad failed to harm Barbal, the firing squad commander shot him five times at close range. His last words were: "To die for Christ, my young friends, is to live". He was the first of 97 of his order killed in Catalonia during the Spanish Civil War.

== Sainthood ==
The beatification process started in Tarragona in 1944 and concluded a short time later in 1945 while the Congregation for the Causes of Saints (C.C.S.) later validated this process several decades later on 7 June 1985 in Rome; the postulation sent the Positio dossier to the C.C.S. in 1988 for assessment. Theological experts first approved on 24 February 1989 that he was killed in odium fidei ("in hatred of the faith") while the C.C.S. conceded the same thing in their meeting on 17 October 1989. Pope John Paul II confirmed on 21 December 1989 that Barbal was killed in hatred of his faith and then beatified Barbal on 29 April 1990.

One miracle was required for his sanctification and when news reached the postulation about one such case it was investigated in the diocese of its origin. For one killed in odium fidei, no miracle is needed for their beatification but one is needed for sainthood. The C.C.S. validated this process on 1 October 1993 and a medical board approved this on 26 October 1994 as did theologians on 20 March 1998 and the C.C.S. on 20 October 1998. John Paul II approved this miracle on 21 December 1998 and canonized Barbal as a saint on 21 November 1999 in Saint Peter's Square.

== See also ==
- Jaime Hilario Integrated School-La Salle, in Bagac, in Bataan, in the Philippines, an educational institution named after Saint Jaime Hilario Barbal
