= De La Salle Lipa =

Roman Catholic college in Batangas, Philippines

- Motto: Crescit Gratia Virtuteque (Latin)
- Motto in English: He grew in grace and wisdom
- Type: Private, Roman Catholic, research non-stock, coeducational basic and higher education institution
- Established: 1962; 64 years ago
- Religious affiliation: Roman Catholic (Christian Brothers)
- Academic affiliations: DLSP IAU NOCEI AASHE ASEACCU IALU EAUC
- Chancellor: Dr. Merlin Teodosia Suarez
- President: Br. Edmundo L. Fernandez FSC
- Principal: Mrs. Kristine Anne C. Dimaculangan
- Dean: Dr. Jasmin D. De Silva (CBEAM); Engr. Cherrie F. Villafuerte (CITE); Dr. Ivee K. Guce (CEAS); Dr. Margie M. Ebreo (CON)
- Academic programs: Pre-elementary, Elementary, Secondary, Tertiary, Graduate and Certificate programs
- Faculty: 532
- Administrative staff: 248
- Students: 6,220
- Location: 1962 J.P. Laurel; National Highway, Lipa City, Batangas, Philippines; 13°56′34″N 121°08′52″E
- Campus: Urban 10 hectares (100,000 m^{2})
- Alma Mater song: Alma Mater Hymn
- Colors: Green and white
- Nickname: Lasallian
- Sporting affiliations: NCAA (Philippines) – South
- Mascot: Green Stallion
- Website: www.dlsl.edu.ph

- Location in Luzon Location in the Philippines

De La Salle Lipa, also known by its acronym DLSL, is a private Catholic Lasallian basic and higher educational institution run by the De La Salle Brothers of the Philippine District of the Christian Brothers in Lipa City, Batangas, Philippines and was founded in 1962. It is one of the third generation of La Salle schools founded by the Catholic religious congregation De La Salle Brothers in the Philippines: La Salle Academy-Iligan (Iligan City, Lanao del Norte) in 1958, La Salle Green Hills (Mandaluyong) in 1959, Saint Joseph School-La Salle (Villamonte, Bacolod) in 1960 and De La Salle Lipa in 1962.

== History ==
In school year 1985–1986, the College Department was formally opened, with Elsie Rabago as officer-in-charge. Norma Blanco was appointed the school's first lay high school principal in 1989. Because of the burgeoning school population, Br. Narciso "Jun" S. Erguiza, FSC was appointed as resident president.

On May 15, 1995, Brother Rafael Donato FSC, former president of De La Salle University, assumed the presidency of De La Salle Lipa. Under Brother Donato, the school constructed the SENTRUM, the Sen. Jose W. Diokno Building, the Chez Avenir Hotel (now called Chez Rafael), the St. La Salle Building, the Noli Me Tangere and El Filibusterismo structure clusters of the Jose Rizal Building, and the Centennial Sports Plaza.

In 1996, the school opened a graduate school, initially offering a Master in Management Technology degree. In 1997, the school became the first educational institution in Batangas to go online, with its web site launched in the same year.

A year later, De La Salle Lipa became one of the first schools around the world to launch an alumni registry web site. Called Umpokan , the web site has become fully interactive and is an online meeting place for graduates of the school.

In 2002, Juan Lozano was appointed the school's first vice-president and chief operating officer. In 2003, Donato retired from active service and was named president emeritus at the auditorium of the Sen. Jose Diokno building. Brother Manuel Pajarillo, FSC was then appointed president.

The school changed its organizational structure in 2005. With Br. Pajarillo still the school's president, Lozano was elevated to the position of Executive Vice-President. Rex Torrecampo was, meanwhile, appointed as the first Vice-President for Administration. The following year, Corazon Abansi became the school's first Vice-President for Academics and Research.

In 2006, the school's incorporation papers were amended to officially make it part of an umbrella entity, De La Salle Philippines, which was formed to synchronize the operations of the De La Salle schools with the mission of the De La Salle Brothers in the Philippines.

In May 2007, in keeping with the standards set by De La Salle Philippines, the executive vice-president became known as the chancellor, while the two vice-presidents became known as vice-chancellors. In school year 2006–2007, Pajarillo was president of three De La Salle schools (Lipa, Dasmariñas, and the Medical and Health Sciences Institute also in Dasmarinas, Cavite), in 2007 he was made president solely of De La Salle Lipa.

During his term, information technology and new facilities were established. Wireless internet connectivity was likewise introduced. The Book Mobile Reading Program (BMRP), a bus turned into a mobile library, was also launched. BMRP reached out to several communities to cater to the youth through storytelling sessions and other literacy training programs.

== Campus ==
Presidents
Name	Tenure of office
Narcisco S. Erguisa	1993–1995
Rafael S. Donato	1995–2003
Manuel R. Pajarillo	2003–2010
Joaquin S. Martinez	2010–2016
Dante Jose R. Amisola	2016–2022
Edmundo L. Fernandez	2022–present

The De La Salle Lipa campus sits on a 10-hectare lot next to the J.P. Laurel National Highway, (Japan-Philippine Friendship highway), just on the outskirts of Lipa City. It is a 5-minute drive from the Southern Tagalog Arterial Road (STAR), which links the city to the Southern Luzon Express Way (SLEX). Batangas City, the provincial capital, is 5 minutes away via STAR tollway.

Entering the main access gate at the front of campus, visitors drive into well-paved concrete roads with parking facilities that can accommodate more than 200 vehicles. The SENTRUM is the first major structure seen, a multi-purpose building that has been the venue of pop concerts, professional basketball games, corporate assemblies, and religious gatherings.

In front of the SENTRUM is a well-kept garden that has a stone sculpture of the founder of the De La Salle Brothers St. Jean-Baptiste de La Salle.

Nearby are the Chez Rafael (formerly Chez Avenir and renamed in honor of the school's former president Br. Rafael S. Donato FSC), a laboratory hotel for BS Hotel & Restaurant Management majors, and the Sen. Jose Diokno Building, which holds the college's Learning Resource Center and the offices of executive administration. The Student Center near the Apolinario Mabini Buildings and CBEAM (College of Business, Economics, Accountancy and Management) Building, holds the building for the Student Government (SG) and the Council of Student Organization (CSO) for college.

The campus may be divided in two areas: the Integrated School side and the College side. Junior High students are prohibited to enter the Learning Resource Center located inside of Sen. Jose Diokno building since they already have their own LRC at Jamie Hilario building. Only Senior High School and College students are permitted to enter the original LRC in Diokno.

On the Integrated School side, the most recognizable structure was the St. La Salle Building, which was made up of several clusters just in front of the highway. However, it has since been demolished as of 2025. The main cluster that offered the main access gate for Integrated School (IS) students, called the Hall of Lasallian Saints, along with the Br. Henry Virgil Memorial Gymnasium and the Br. Vernon Mabile Building, stood abandoned since 2020 due to the buildings instability caused by the 2020 Taal volcano eruption. On May 11, 2026, De La Salle Lipa blessed the new parking facility in the campus in partnership with its wholly-owned subsidiary Feldgrau E-Access Inc on the previous location of the demolished St. La Salle building.

The Br. Jaime Hilario Building, which opened in 2024, is the new building for the Junior High School which stands in the former site of the now demolished Br. Gregory Building and serves as a replacement for the old St. La Salle Building. The St. Benilde Building is the building for the Grade School. On the Senior High School side, the buildings used are the Claro M. Recto, Portion of St Mutien Marie, St. Miguel and Jose Rizal (composed of the Noli Me Tangere and El Filibusterismo structure clusters).

College students hold classes on the western half of the campus, using the Apolinario Mabini Building, and CBEAM (College of Business, Economics, Accountancy and Management) Building. The Gregorio Zara building is also on the college side of the campus. Also known as the I.T. Domain Building, it holds the school's Network Operations Center as well as three computer laboratories. Beside the building is a gate and an access road that leads to the De La Salle Brothers’ Novitiate.

== Organizational Divisions ==
=== Academic Division ===
==== Integrated School (IS) Division ====
- Primary School (Kinder to Grade 6)
- Junior High School (Grade 7 to Grade 10)
- Senior High School (Grade 11 to Grade 12)

==== College Division ====
- College of Business, Economics, Accountancy & Management (CBEAM)
- College of Education, Arts & Sciences (CEAS)
- College of International Hospitality and Tourism Management (CIHTM)
- College of Information Technology & Engineering (CITE)
- College of Law (COL)
- College of Nursing (CON)
- College of Criminal Justice Education (CCJE)

=== Offices Under the OP and the OEVP ===
Office of the President

- Presidential Management Office

Office of the Executive Vice-President

- Lasallian Ministries
- Sports & Culture

== Publications ==
=== Institutional ===
- The President's Report (Annual)
- The Ala (Salle) Eh! (Quarterly)
- SADYÂ (Twice Monthly)

=== Integrated school ===
- Bulik (Integrated School Broadsheet)
- Bulik Literary Folio (Student Magazine)
- Bakas (Grade School Student Newsletter)
- Kamalig (Student Newsletter)
- CRESCIT (Senior High School Newspaper)
- PÁNANAW (Senior High School Literary Folio)
- PANORAMA (Senior High School Art Folio)
- typo. (Senior High School Student Magazine)

=== College ===
- LAVOXA (Student Broadsheet & Tabloid)
- Umalohokan (Student Newsletter)
- L Magazine (Student Magazine)
- Utak Berde (Student Literary Magazine)
- Talas (Faculty Journal)
- MMT Link (Graduate School Journal)
- Etudes (Research Office Newsletter)
- Infobits (Guidance Newsletter)
- Parents’ Bulletin (Guidance Newsletter)
- Educator's Link (Guidance Newsletter)
