= Egbert Xavier Kelly =

De La Salle Brother (1894–1945)

Brother Egbert Xavier Kelly F.S.C.
- Born: William Kelly; 4 March 1894; County Wicklow, Ireland, United Kingdom of Great Britain and Ireland
- Died: 12 February 1945 (aged 50); Manila, American Philippines
- Title: President of De La Salle College
- Term: 1937–1945

Brother Egbert Xavier Kelly, F.S.C. (1894–1945) was an Irish De La Salle Brother who was last assigned to the De La Salle Brothers in the Philippines and was kidnapped and then murdered by the retreating Japanese Imperial Forces at the De La Salle College, of which he was President, during the Allied Liberation of Manila during World War II.

== Early life ==
He was born William Kelly on 4 March 1894 in County Wicklow, Ireland. During his youth decided to become a De La Salle brother and went to the Christian Brothers Retreat in Castletown to test his vocation. He was then admitted to the novitiate and became a member of the Institute.

== Assignment to the Philippines ==
In 1911 Kelly was assigned to the Christian Brothers District of Penang. During his trip, he went for a brief stay in Colombo, Ceylon after which he proceeded to De La Salle College in Manila in 1912, after the request of its inaugural president Bro. Blimond Pierre. He began teaching in the grade school department until he was tasked to teach in the high school department.

== Assignment to Belgium ==
Kelly was selected by the Christian Brothers Superiors to help in the establishment of a Second Novitiate at the General Motherhouse in Lebecq-les-Hal, Belgium. This assignment was completed in 1930.

== Return to the Philippines ==
Upon the completion of his assignment to the Motherhouse, Brother Xavier returned to Asia to teach for three years in Rangoon, Burma, and another three years in Hong Kong. In 1935, he was reassigned to Manila and was appointed President of De La Salle College in 1937.

Kelly's first six years as President was spent in expanding the facilities of the College. A large classroom wing was constructed at the north end of St. La Salle Hall and a new chapel was constructed at its south end. This chapel was considered the most beautiful in the Philippines and had few rivals in the District, although the Brothers would regret about the chapel's limited size. The chapel was dedicated in 1940 and was large enough to accommodate the school's entire student body, which was then 1,200. On February 2, 1941, he became the founding treasurer and member of the Catholic Educational Association of the Philippines (CEAP), together with co-founders Sister May Caritas, O.P. and the Manila Vicar-General Rev. Msgr. Jose Jovellanos from Tondo as its inaugural President, under the blessing of Irish compatriot Archbishop Michael J. O'Doherty, D.D.

=== World War II ===
Kelly was the President of De La Salle College in Manila when the Japanese army invaded the Philippines on 8 December 1941.

In January 1942, Japanese troops forcibly entered De La Salle College and began to occupy all but a small portion of the building. The Irish Brothers were left to the chapel and a few small rooms while the American De La Salle Christian Brothers were interned, first in a retreat house of the Society of Jesus at Santa Ana, Manila, and then in a Spanish hospital in San Pedro, Makati. They were later put in a Japanese concentration camp in Los Baños, Laguna, until they were rescued and freed together with their other fellow clergy-prisoners by the American Forces under General Douglas MacArthur in February 1945.

The other De La Salle Christian Brothers on the De La Salle Taft Campus, including Kelly, were not imprisoned by the Japanese at the start of the Japanese Occupation and permitted to stay on the De La Salle campus on Taft Avenue.

On 10 February 1945, a Japanese detail forcibly took Kelly and separated him from the others in the building. He was never seen again and his body was never recovered.

Kelly, plus the other 16 De La Salle Christian Brothers soon murdered by the Japanese inside De La Salle College in February 1945, are now honored with an elegant marble plaque at the entrance of the De La Salle Main Chapel.

== Beatification ==
The Congregation for the Causes of Saints has preserved the cause of Bro. Kelly, and it has applied for the decree of nihil obstat for Bro. Kelly, in order for him to receive the title of "Servant of God" by the Holy See.

Preceded by Bro. Flannan Paul, F.S.C.	President of De La Salle College; 1937-1945	Succeeded by Bro. Lucian Athanasius Reinhart, F.S.C.
