= De La Salle Canlubang =

Roman Catholic university in Laguna, Philippines

De La Salle University - Laguna Campus
- Former name: De La Salle Canlubang
- Motto: Religio Mores Cultura (Latin)
- Motto in English: Religion, Morals, Culture
- Type: Private, Roman Catholic, non-stock, coeducational institution
- Active: 2003–Present (integrated with DLSU to establish its Laguna Campus)
- Accreditation: PAASCU
- Religious affiliation: Roman Catholic (Christian Brothers)
- President: Br. Bernard S. Oca, FSC
- Administrative staff: 174
- Location: Biñan, Laguna, Philippines; 14°15′39″N 121°02′34″E
- Campus: Suburban 50 ha (120 acres)
- Hymn: Alma Mater Hymn
- Colors: Green and white
- Nickname: DLSU-IS Green Archers (Integrated School)
- Sporting affiliations: PRISAAB RAAM SJBL LISAA
- Mascot: Green Archer
- Website: https://www.dlsu.edu.ph/
- Location in Laguna Location in Luzon Location in the Philippines

De La Salle University - Laguna Campus, previously known as De La Salle Canlubang, is a private Catholic basic and higher education institution and a member institution of De La Salle Philippines run by the Institute of the Brothers of the Christian Schools located in Biñan, Laguna, Philippines. It is situated right across the Laguna Technopark district. The campus, which was acquired on 2003, is a 50-hectare (120-acre) prime property. Part of this property was donated by the family of the late National Artist for Architecture Leandro Locsin, who is an alumnus of De La Salle College Manila (Now De La Salle University Manila)

In 2012, the administrators of De La Salle University and De La Salle Canlubang approved the integration of DLSC to DLSU, becoming the DLSU Science & Technology Complex or the DLSU Leandro V. Locsin Campus, which was later renamed to De La Salle University – Laguna Campus.

== History ==
The Brothers of the Christian Schools, officially known as Fratres Scholarum Christianarum or FSC, is a congregation dedicated to the teachings espoused by Saint Jean Baptiste de La Salle.

The first De La Salle School in the Philippines was opened on June 16, 1911, along General Luna, Paco, Manila at the request of the Archbishop of Manila. In 1921, the school was moved to its present site on Taft Avenue. Unable to accommodate requests for admission to the elementary grades, they had to revert an earlier policy not to expand. To date, they have spread out to different provinces. The Brothers have since opened in Greenhills, Antipolo, Lipa, Bacolod, Iligan, Dasmarinas, and Alabang. They have also undertaken supervision of some schools in Manila, Cavite, Bataan, Cebu, Bukidnon, Surigao del Sur, Negros Occidental, Masbate, Capiz, and Ozamis. Today they are known as De La Salle Supervised Schools.

Around 1977, the idea of having another La Salle School, this time in the Laguna area was conceptualized. This was when Architect Lindy Locsin, then a member of Manila's De La Salle University (DLSU) board of Trustees, offered to donate several hectares of his family's land to La Salle. In 1997, this generous donation of the Locsins was realized. La Salle purchased additional contiguous lands making De La Salle Canlubang a sprawling fifty-hectare campus.

Laguna is a growing industrial and technological site. Its industrial companies presently make it the home of the first Science Technological Park. In response to scientific and technological development of modern times, the concept of a three-level science and technology oriented school took root. Hence, De La Salle Canlubang (DLSC) was established in June 2003 in order to address the educational concerns of the nation.

The Integrated school opened its doors to 240 students from preschool to grade 4 and grade 8 (second year high school) during its first year. The curriculum adapts to the science education as its basis. Science emphasizes hands-on exploration and direct experience with the natural world; thereby producing young scientists who are well-rounded and whose strength include: science and technological skills, clear-analytical thinking, and scientific literacy, to be active members of society.

After DLSC was integrated into DLSU to become De La Salle University Science and Technology Complex (DLSU -STC) in 2012, its Integrated School has grown to be one of the most progressive educational institutions south of Metro Manila with a population of more than 1,000 students from Kinder 1 to Grade 12 geared towards producing lifelong learners with the spirit of Faith, Service and Communion and equipped to meet the challenges of the new 2000 millennium. The campus was later renamed De La Salle University - Laguna Campus.

De La Salle University - Integrated School announced on AY 2023-2024 that the Senior High School department would be transitioned into The Academy, in which the SHS department of both the Manila and Laguna campuses would be more inter-connected than before in order to improve the relationship between Manila and Laguna. This created The Academy Lane, in which students from the Laguna Campus' SHS would be able to study in college without having to take the DLSU College Application Test (DCAT).

== Campus ==
Campus Buildings and Facilities

=== Integrated School ===
These buildings are used by those who are under the Integrated School system, covering students from Kindergarten to Junior High School (Grade 10). Please note that students who are from the Senior High School or College are NOT allowed inside except for the National Bookstore.

- Learning Center 1 (Integrated School) (LC1), home to DLSU Integrated School's pre-school, Kindergarten, and elementary (Grades 1-4). The building contains the grade school’s robotics laboratory and the Integrated School’s Industrial Laboratory— ensuring advanced learning within young learners and the students’ abilities in woodworking and carpentry. LC1 also houses the Integrated School’s St. John Baptist de La Salle Chapel— a medium sized fully-air conditioned prayer space dedicated to St. La Salle, and the Integrated School’s Student Discipline and Formation Unit (SDFU), DLSU Laguna’s satellite office of DLSU Manila’s Student Discipline and Formation Office (SDFO).
- Learning Center 2 (Integrated School) also known as Learning Center 2 (LC2), houses the Integrated School’s elementary department (Grades 5-6) and its high school department (Grades 7-10). The building holds advanced educational facilities such as the grade school and high school TLE laboratory, the robotics laboratory, as well as computer laboratories 1 and 2, and other science, research and engineering laboratories, key for producing highly innovative learners and collaborators. The building also contains the LC2 clinic, the Integrated School Library and the administrative facility for the Integrated School’s Office of The Registrar for Basic Education (ORBE). This is also where DLSU Laguna's National Bookstore is located (beside the cafeteria).
- Pergola (Integrated School) is a multi-purpose covered court used for school-wide or level-wide events. Currently, it is the home court for the De La Salle University Integrated School’s girl’s and boy’s volleyball team.

=== The Academy & School of Innovation and Sustainability ===
These buildings are predominantly used by the Senior High School students and College students enrolled in the Laguna Campus. Manila enrolled students may also use these buildings.

- Milagros R. del Rosario Building, the first building built in the campus. The five-story building houses the classroom for the senior high school students, administrative offices (for SHS and College only), computer and science laboratories, an auditorium, the college library (accessible for SHS students), a media laboratory, a radio station booth, The Store at DLSU Laguna branch, and three research facilities including the Innovation Hub. The building was donated to the school by former Ambassador to Canada, Germany, and Japan, Ramon V. del Rosario. It started construction in April 2002 and was completed in June 2003. The building was designed by the firm L.V. Locsin and Partners.
- Richard L. Lee Engineering Technology Block, originally known as The Hangar, a three-story hub of the university's engineering program, inaugurated in February 2019. It houses the industry locators doing various R&D projects on campus, as well as Animo Labs and laboratories that will cater to college students under the College of Computer Studies, College of Science, Gokongwei College of Engineering and the School of Innovation and Sustainability (formerly Laguna Campus College).
- George S.K. Ty Advanced Instrumentation Building, originally known as the Clean Building, a four-story building completed in 2018 and inaugurated in 2019. It currently houses classrooms for the college level, as well as high-precision equipment for experiments and laboratory works. It is also home to research facilities, including the Central Instrumentation Facility (NMR Lab), Integrated Electron Microscopy Center, Biological Control Research Unit, and Imaging and Cell Culture Facility.
- John L. Gokongwei Jr. Innovation Center, a three-story building launched in January 2019 that hosted the Philippine hub of Ubisoft from 2018 to 2024. It currently hosts a Lasallian museum on its ground floor and a study hall on its second floor.
- Enrique K. Razon Jr. Hall, a multidisciplinary center that houses the Enrique K. Razon Jr. Logistics Institute and learning spaces, including the "first bi-level digital learning commons" just like the Learning Commons at the Manila Campus. Inaugurated on December 6, 2024, it is named after La Salle Green Hills alumnus Enrique K. Razon.
- University Hall, an academic building adjoining the Enrique K. Razon Jr. Hall made up of classrooms and the cafeteria, opened in 2025.
- Evelyn D. Ang Hall, a building that will house the Evelyn D. Ang Institute of Biomedical Engineering and Health Technologies (EDA-IBEHT). Groundbreaking was held on November 24, 2023. It opened its door to students during AY 2026-2027.

=== Other buildings and facilities ===
These buildings and facilities are used by the entire Lasallian community for multiple use.

- One Mission Park, a park between the Milagros R. del Rosario Building and Learning Commons 1 containing the statue of St. John Baptist de La Salle and the 100th anniversary logo of De La Salle University.
- Residence Hall, a two-story dormitory for senior high school and college students, and the first dormitory at the campus. It also houses a cafe that non-residences could enter.
- Kalye Berde, an elevated park with the statue of Leandro Locsin.
- Teaching Laboratory Building, also known as the Clean Building Extension, a five-story building situated next to George S.K. Ty Advanced Instrumentation Building.The building was completed in 2023.
- Santuario de La Salle, the world's first Roman Catholic shrine dedicated to St. John Baptist de La Salle. Originally named as Signum Fidei Chapel and Shrine of St. John Baptist de La Salle, its groundbreaking was held on January 26, 2019, on the campus's former open parking, and it was opened on November 21, 2022. A carillon tower is located southeast of the shrine.

=== Sports facilities ===
- The campus' Football Field and Track Oval, an artificial football pitch and track and field oval. The football field, surrounded by an IAAF-standard track, measures 100 by 64 meters (328 by 210 ft) wide and is the second artificial pitch in Laguna after the Biñan Football Stadium
- St. Matthew Gymnasium, a fully air-conditioned indoor sports facility that features open courts with a 504-seating capacity for university-wide activities and events, donated by DLSU alumnus Danilo Dimayuga. It was opened on September 21, 2022, coinciding with the feast day of its namesake, St. Matthew the Apostle. It is the home court of the DLSU Integrated School Green Archers and the DLSU Integrated School Lady Archers (boy’s and girl’s basketball team). The St. Matthew Gymnasium is also the host-court for the St. John Baptist League. It also hosts the semi-Olympic swimming pool open to the school's swimming club and Physical Education subject.
- DLSU Covered Court, the original indoor court of the campus.
- IS Football Field, a soccer field near DLSU Integrated School buildings such as LC1 and LC2.
- Baseball Diamond, a baseball diamond near LC2.
- Courtyard Hall, a student dormitory managed by Arthaland Corporation on its property next to the DLSU Laguna Campus, is also considered part of the campus.

The campus will also open the following facility as part of its ongoing development:

- University Pad, a condominium, dormitory, and hotel developed by Summitleaf, Inc. Groundbreaking was held on December 6, 2024, and the facility is expected to be finished after 24 months.

Ayala Land Developments (Broadfield)

Ayala Broadfield is a master-planned, mixed-use estate located in Biñan City, Laguna, Philippines, developed by Ayala Land through its subsidiary Alveo Land. The development is designed as a modern business and lifestyle district that integrates commercial, residential, office, and recreational spaces within a walkable and sustainable urban environment. It features landscaped open spaces, pedestrian-friendly roads, and a connected network of developments intended to promote a live-work-play setting. Positioned along major growth corridors in Southern Luzon, Ayala Broadfield aims to serve as a new hub for business and innovation outside Metro Manila. Its direct access De La Salle University- Laguna Campus enhances its strategic value as a key development adjacent to a major academic institution in the region.
