= De La Salle University – Dasmariñas =

Roman Catholic university in Cavite, Philippines

- Pamantasang De La Salle–Dasmariñas (Filipino)
- Former names: General Emilio Aguinaldo College – Cavite (1977–1987); De La Salle University – Emilio Aguinaldo College (1987–1992); De La Salle University – Aguinaldo (1992–1997)
- Motto: Fides Servitium Committere (Latin)
- Motto in English: Faith, Committed to Service
- Type: Private Catholic research Non-profit co-educational secondary and higher education institution
- Established: July 18, 1977; 49 years ago
- Founder: Institute of the Brothers of the Christian Schools
- Religious affiliation: Catholic Church (Christian Brothers)
- Academic affiliations: De La Salle Philippines UMAP
- President: Br. Iñigo R. Riola, FSC, EdD
- Administrative staff: 1,027
- Students: Approx. 15,000 (2014–2015)
- Location: Dasmariñas, Cavite, Philippines; 14°19′25″N 120°57′35″E
- Campus: Urban, 27 hectares (270,000 m^{2})
- Alma Mater song: Alma Mater Hymn
- Patron saint: Jean-Baptiste de La Salle
- Colors: Green & white
- Sporting affiliations: NCRAA UCAA PRISAA UNIGAMES
- Mascot: Patriots
- Website: www.dlsud.edu.ph
- Location in Luzon Location in the Philippines

De La Salle University–Dasmariñas (Filipino: Pamantasang De La Salle–Dasmariñas), also referred to by its acronym DLSU-D, UD, or La Salle–Dasma, is a private Roman Catholic, Lasallian co-educational secondary and higher education institution run by the De La Salle Brothers of the Philippine District of the Christian Brothers in Dasmariñas, Philippines. It is a member of De La Salle Philippines, a network of 16 Lasallian educational institutions.

DLSU-D, despite its name, is an autonomous university separate from the De La Salle University in Manila. Both universities are members of the De La Salle Philippines System. Also, approximately three kilometres (1.9 mi) from it is the De La Salle Medical and Health Sciences Institute, a separate De La Salle campus that specializes in medicine and allied health education.

== History ==
The university was established on July 18, 1977, as a private, nonsectarian tertiary school named General Emilio Aguinaldo College-Cavite and managed by the Yaman Lahi Foundation. In 1987, ownership and management were transferred to Frère (St.) Bénilde Romançon Educational Foundation Inc., a sister corporation of De La Salle University-Manila. It became a Catholic institution under the name De La Salle University-Emilio Aguinaldo College. In 1992, the name DLSU-EAC was changed to De La Salle University-Aguinaldo. In 1997, the institution's name was changed again. It is presently known as De La Salle University–Dasmariñas to avoid confusion with the Emilio Aguinaldo College Cavite campus. In August 12, 2026, DLSU-D launched its new logo and branding before its kick-off of the institution's 40th anniversary in 2027.

DLSU-D Logo (2008-2026)

== Campus ==
=== East campus ===
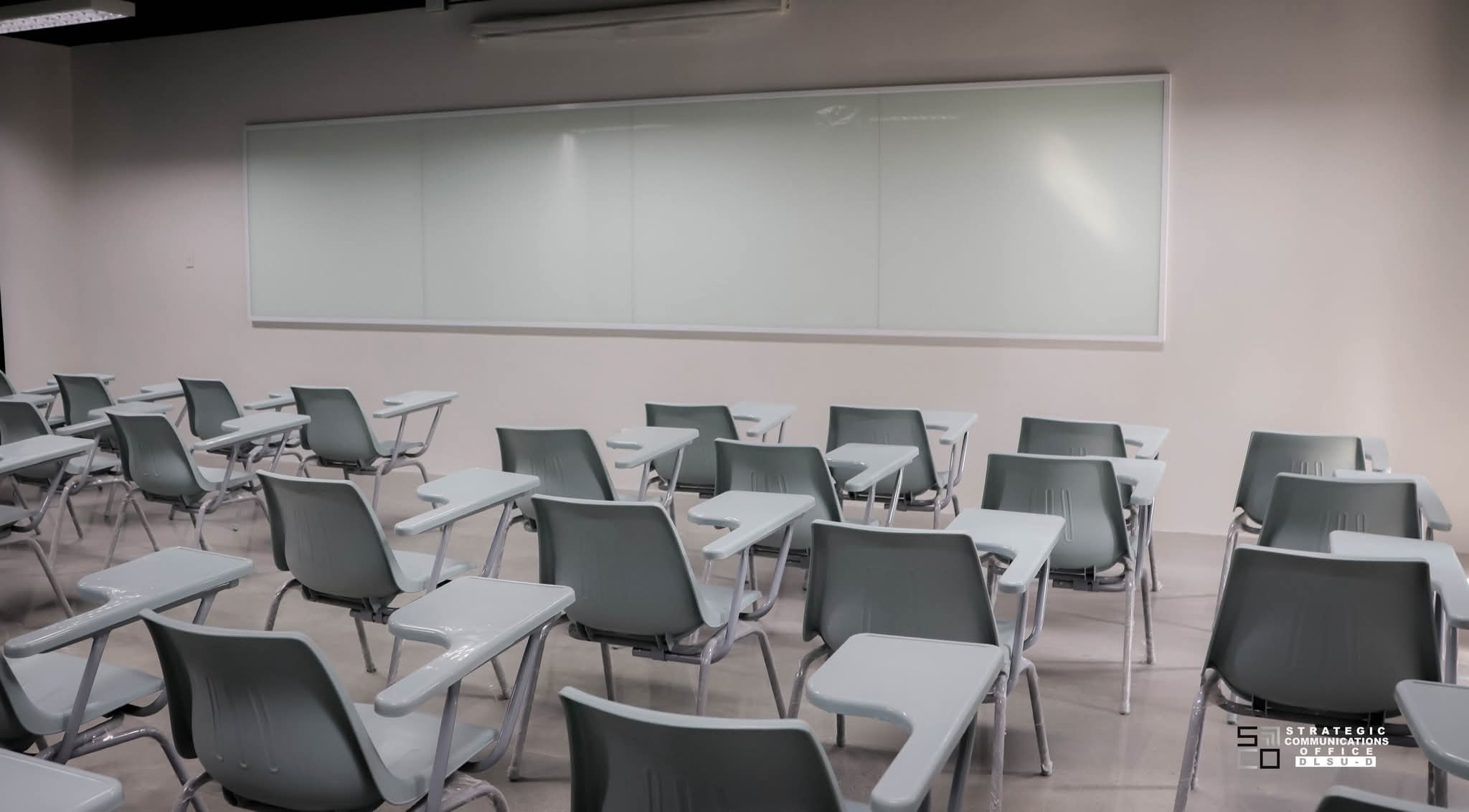
A typical classroom at De La Salle University – Dasmariñas.

The East campus is occupied by the Colleges of Liberal Arts and Communication, Science and Computer Studies, Tourism and Hospitality Management. The bookstore, different laboratories, chapel, museum, and the Aklatang Emilio Aguinaldo are also located here.

- Magdalo Gate (Gate 1) - named after the Katipunan faction led by Emilio Aguinaldo, it is an entry-exit point for students, faculty, staff, and visitors going to the East Campus.
- La Porteria - located near Magpuri Gate, houses the Student Welfare and Formation Office (SWAFO), and the Language Learning Center (LLC) on the second floor.
- Julian Felipe Hall (JFH) - named after the composer of the Lupang Hinirang, it is the College of Liberal Arts and Communication building. It houses classrooms, and laboratories for Communication, Broadcast Journalism, Psychology, and Speech students. It also houses the Tanghalang Julian Felipe (theater) and the Bulwagang Jose Basa, which is the parliamentary hall and laboratory for the Political Science students.
- Paulo Campos Hall (PCH) - Named after Dr. Paulo C. Campos, the founding president of the institution during its period as De La Salle University–Emilio Aguinaldo College, it serves as the campus’s main science building. It houses the Chemical and Biological Research Laboratories, which support scientific work and research-based activities. The laboratories provide facilities for the study of Biology, Biochemistry, Organic Chemistry, Analytical Chemistry, Ecology, Physics, and Natural History.
- Pantaleon Garcia Hall (PGH) - is the main headquarters of the 267th Naval Reserve Officers Training Corps, located below the Grandstand Oval (GDO), where it was filled with basement classrooms, notably used in the NSTP-CWTS (Civic Welfare Training Service) subject.
- Mariano Alvarez Hall (MAH) - named after a Caviteño hero, it formerly housed the Information and Communications Technology Center and computer laboratories until the new Information and Communications Technology Center building was erected. It was also the former building of the College of Education and now houses the Buildings, Facilities, and Maintenance Office (BFMO).
- Purificacion Borromeo Hall (PBH) - Formerly the College of Tourism and Hospitality Management (CTHM) Building is the primary building of Hotel & Restaurant Management and Tourism students. It houses various laboratories and function rooms. This building replaced the two buildings, which are the Emiliano Riego de Dios Hall (ERH) and Olivia Salamanca Hall (OSH).
- College of Science (COS) - has ten classrooms and houses the faculty rooms of Biological Sciences, Physical Sciences, Computer Studies, and Mathematics and Statistics departments, and Graduate Studies
- Information and Communications Technology Center (ICTC) - This serves as the new computer laboratory of the university after its completion. The building was notably used by students of the College of Information and Computer Studies (CICS; formerly known as the College of Science and Computer Studies or CSCS) and its two courses: Computer Science (CS), and Information Technology (I.T.).
- Small Business Center (SBC) - a canteen on the first floor was replaced by National Bookstore while the Lasallian Community Development Center (an organization established for community service) is based on the second floor.
- Severino Delas Alas Hall (SDH/Alumni Building) - A function building that also serves as the office of the De La Salle Alumni Association (DLSU-D Chapter). Houses two conference rooms, a multi-purpose function hall, and a 450-seater auditorium.
- Botanical Garden - serves as a research center for Biology students, as well as recreation for the DLSU-D community.

=== Br. Gus Boquer FSC Cultural Heritage Complex ===
As part of DLSU-D's aim for cultural development, and maintaining its Spanish-period-inspired motif, the three structures in the Museum Complex were officially named the Br. Gus Boquer FSC Cultural Heritage Complex.

- Aklatang Emilio Aguinaldo (AEA) - DLSU-D's library. It houses collections of books, periodicals, theses, and other reference materials. It was modeled after Emilio Aguinaldo's residential house at Kawit, Cavite. The first building was a scaled-down model, and featured only the facade. The new building is an exact model of the Aguinaldo shrine with the tower. It houses most of the collections and archives, and has discussion rooms, as well as the Executive Vice President's office (which will remain until the new Administration building is finished). The old building houses the Electronic Resource Services (the Internet nook), the Educational Media Services (which holds such media as videos, slides, presentations, and the like), as well as four viewing and conference rooms.
- Museo De La Salle - Museo De La Salle is a museum dedicated to the preservation of certain aspects and material culture of the 19th-century Philippine ilustrado lifestyle. The Museo was built to contribute to cross-disciplinary learning and growth in the academic environment, and to provide a fine example of Philippine culture that is linked to its immediate community while being open to the outside world. It also houses the main office of the Lasallian Student Ambassadors (LSA), an auxiliary student organization that consists of students who became representatives and in charge of duty activities such as touring selected sections or outside guests from the country or outside Philippines in Museo.
  - Its collection comprises antique family heirlooms such as furniture, decorative objects, fine and applied arts displayed in faithfully recreated rooms, donated by, or on long-term loan from collectors. Among the donors and lenders are Jose Ma. Ricardo A. Panlilio of the Santos-Joven Panlilio family of Bacolor, Pampanga; Brother Andrew Gonzalez, FSC, of the Arnedo-Gonzales family of Sulipan Apalit, Pampanga; Marie Theresa Lammoglia-Virata, Victorina Vizcarra Amaliñgan, the D.M. Guevara Foundation Inc., Paulino and Hetty Que, former National Commission for Culture and the Arts Chairman Jaime C. Laya and international jeweler Fe Sarmiento - Panlilio. The construction and design of the Museo, which was a collaboration between project leader Jose Ma. Panlilio and the architectural team of OBMapua and Partners led by architects Joel Lopez and Obi Mapua Jr. took years to finish in its aim to faithfully represent the lifestyle of the period.
- Antonio and Victoria Cojuangco Memorial Chapel of Our Lady of the Holy Rosary - modeled after the facade of the parish church of Maragondon, Cavite, it was dedicated to the martyrs who were killed during World War II when they took refuge at the DLSU-Manila campus during Liberation. It houses the Campus Ministry Office.

=== West campus ===
Situated in the West campus, 600 meters away from the East campus, are the Colleges of Business Administration and Accountancy, Engineering, Architecture and Technology, the condominiums, dormitories, canteens, and the administration building.

- University Food Square - an al fresco food court, where most of the members of the DLSU-D community gather to eat.
- Lake Park - an open-air activity center, where most student events take place.
- Ladislao Diwa Hall (LDH) - named after a hero of Biyak-na-Bato, this building holds the classrooms of the College of Education.
- Felipe Calderon Hall (FCH) - It is currently used by the College of Education and the College of Criminal Justice Education.
- Vito Belarmino Hall (VBH) - a former classroom building. It currently serves as the warehouses for both the staff and the student organizations.
- Gregoria Montoya Hall (GMH) - named after a heroine during the Revolution, this is more known as the Administration building. It houses most administrators' offices. The Registrar's, the Accounting, the Purchasing, and Internal Audit offices are based here. In addition, most student organizations hold office in this building, namely: the University Student Government, the University Student Election Commission, the Judiciary Branch, the Heraldo Filipino (official student publication), the Council of Student Organizations, and the Performing Arts Group.
- Candido Tirona Hall (CTH) - It was one of the oldest buildings in the university until the structure was renovated in 2012 to support the fast-growing population of the university and serve as a temporary building for the College of Engineering and Architecture Technology. It is the former building of the Accountancy Department of the College of Business Administration.
- Maria Salome Llanera Hall (MLH) - The former CEAT Building served as the main home of Engineering and Architecture until February AY 2011–2012, when it was ordered vacated after technical consultants declared it structurally unfit. Since then, it has remained closed and unused, and CEAT operations were moved to other campus facilities. To replace the condemned structure, DLSU–Dasmariñas constructed an entirely new CEAT building, now named Maria Salome Llanera Hall. Completed and opened in 2025, this modern facility features 25 classrooms, 42 specialized laboratories, offices, and multipurpose spaces, making it one of the most advanced academic buildings on campus and the new permanent home of the CEAT programs.
- Mariano Trías Hall (MTH) - Formerly the CET building, now occupied by the College of Business Administration, specifically the Business Management department. But due to the structural instability of the College of Engineering and Architecture Technology building, the College of Business Administration is currently sharing this with the College of Engineering and Architecture Technology.
- College of Business Administration - Graduate School of Business (CBA-GSB) Building - houses classrooms, laboratories, function rooms, and offices. It serves as the primary building of the College of Business Administration and Accountancy.
- Track Oval - one of DLSU-D's sports facilities. It was renovated in 2012 and was finished in January 2013. It was also known as the Grandstand Oval or GDO.
- Grandstand - serves as seating for spectators. Also houses classrooms and the athletes' quarters. The grandstand is also used by the 267th NROTCU for training days every Saturday as it fits 100+ basic cadets (mostly freshman) in one oval.
- Ugnayang La Salle (ULS) - formerly the Palaruang La Salle (meaning "The Playplace of La Salle"), it is the sports complex. It houses a three-court stadium, the offices of the Physical Education Department and the Sports Development Office (SDO) and an Olympic-sized pool adjacent to it. This is also where most of the university events are held.
- High School Building - the infrastructure that houses the DLSU-D High School students. In 2016, in compliance to the K-12 curriculum, DLSU-D opened its doors for Senior High School students.
- Magdiwang Gate (Gate 3) - named after Mariano Álvarez's faction of the Katipunan, it serves as an auxiliary entry for both pedestrians and motorists.

=== Other structures ===
- Dormitories
- Campus Gourmet and Hotel Rafael - laboratories for Hotel and Restaurant Management students.
- National Book Store
- Atsushi Herb House
- University Events Center
- Amphitheater

== Affiliations ==
De La Salle University-Dasmariñas is a member of De La Salle Philippines, a network of 16 Lasallian institutions established in 2006. DLSP is the successor of the De La Salle University System, a similar organization.

The university also maintains linkages with local academic institutions namely: De La Salle-Santiago Zobel School, University of Baguio, University of Batangas, Central Luzon State University, industries ( Philippine Airlines, ABS-CBN Broadcasting Corporation, Intel, Jollibee-Fast Food Career Dev't. Program) and government units Cultural Center of the Philippines, Bangko Sentral ng Pilipinas, Senate of the Philippines, National Fisheries Biological Center for collaborative training and research, technical consultancy, and faculty and student exchange.

== Research ==
DLSU-D established the University Research Office to manage the university's research activities and programs.

The office has funded and supported numerous faculty researches in the fields of science, education, liberal arts, and technology, among others.

Articles, excerpts, and abstracts from selected researches were compiled and published in the bi-annual journal SINAG. SINAG means "ray of light" in Filipino.

The office closely works with college deans and college publication committees in preparation for the first issues of the four(4) newly conceptualized refereed journals in 2007 which focus on the disciplines of the 7 colleges: Science & Technology Journal (COS, CLEAPS & CET), Journal of Humanities (CLA), Journal of Business (CBA & CIHM), and Journal of Education (COE).

Cavite Studies Center

The Cavite Studies Center pursues the DLSU-D's vision-mission of "undertaking research focusing on Cavite history and culture." It produces research outputs on the history of Cavite, the province, and to highlight its role in national history.

== Student life ==
Beginning in 2014–2015, 29,253 students were enrolled in the university's seven colleges.

=== Heraldo Filipino ===
The Heraldo Filipino (HF) is the official student newspaper of De La Salle University-Dasmariñas. It publishes news about on-campus events and issues concerning the Lasallian community as well as real-life issues across the Philippines.

Heraldo FIlipino can also refer to the student organization that produces publications (namely: magazines, books, booklets, etc.) and hosts events for the DLSU-D community. Newspapers would usually be released on either the start of the new semester as the newspaper issues released focuses on the previous semester's news.

=== Athletics ===
The Patriots is the official name of the DLSU-D Varsity teams. The name was adopted in 1997, a reference to the province's history during the uprising against the Spanish rule in the Philippines.

Basketball and volleyball are the school's main sports. Other varsity sports include track and field, taekwondo, judo, aikido, table tennis, badminton, chess and football.

DLSU-Dasmariñas is a longtime member of the National Capital Region Athletic Association (NCRAA) and is a charter member of the Universities and Colleges Athletic Association (UCAA) from its inception in 2002. The school is also a member of the Private Schools Athletic Association and the annual University Games (UNIGAMES) hosted mostly by provincial schools.

In October 2003, the school became the first institution from the Luzon area to host the UNIGAMES meet.

Its men's and women's volleyball teams have won several championships in the UCAA and NCRAA, as they have been at one time, the year's multiple times defending titlists. Their basketball playing style has given them marginal success that includes a runner-up finish in the UCAA against their former namesake Emilio Aguinaldo College in 2005.

=== Human Lasallian Star ===
The Lasallian "Signum Fidei" Sign of Faith Star is a 350-year-old international symbol of the Christian Brothers of the De La Salle Schools that represents their religious vocation of quality God-centered, Christian-values-based education in 1,500 Lasallian institutions with 70 Universities and Colleges that are globally established by Saint La Salle's Christian Brothers in 82 countries. The Signum Fidei Lasallian was inspired by the Nativity Christmas Star from Bethlehem that symbolized Saint La Salle's mission of Teaching Minds, Touching Hearts, and Transforming Lives of the very poor. The Lasallian mission was to give hope to the Last, Least, and the Lost of the most venerable youth in our society.

The Human Lasallian Signum Fidei Star first came to life on February 11, 2009, during the Lasallian Days Festival as a means to encourage all Lasallians to show their school spirit in an environment of camaraderie and shared ideals. Attended by over 10,000 administrators, students, and faculty, the first attempt to form the largest human star in the world was held at the DLSU-D oval and was witnessed by spectators from the top of the CBA building and the DLSU-D grandstand. The star spanned approximately 71 meters, and occupied a total area of 2,145 square meters.

DLSU-D attempted the feat again on January 26, 2010, this time at night. The event drew in 13,000 participants: students, faculty, administrators, and parents. Participants were given the glow sticks of green and white, the school colors of De La Salle. As night fell, the crowd assembled into a huge star twinkling brightly against the darkness. This moment of history was further heightened by the singing of the school hymn.

Another attempt was made on June 17, 2012 at DLSU-D Grandstand. Around 25,000 Lasallians and supporters of La Salle became part of the star and contributed to reaching the target of raising P2.5 million for the scholarship fund. The star formation was part of the closing ceremonies of the centennial celebration of the Lasallian presence in the Philippines. It also signalled the opening of the upcoming Jubilee celebration of DLSU-D’s 25th year as a Lasallian institution.

=== La Estrella Verde ===
La Estrella Verde (LEV) is the official Senior High School (SHS) student publication of De La Salle University–Dasmariñas. Founded and established in 2016, the publication serves as a medium (through print, online, and radio) for students to be aware of all current events and latest updates happening around the senior high school community. Its name translates to "The Green Star."

=== ANIMOSAIC 2: Humans of St. La Salle ===
De La Salle University-Dasmariñas (DLSU-D) had broken records with its human formation of the Lasallian Signum Fidei Star and a coin mural of the school logo. To commemorate the 300th feast day of its founder, thousands of people held color-coded umbrellas to form the largest image of Saint Jean-Baptiste de La Salle at the DLSU-D Track Oval on Sunday, April 7, 2019. About 6,000 students, employees, and stakeholders of DLSU-D participated in the fundraising event dubbed "Animosaic 2: Humans of St La Salle." The fundraising event is dedicated to all the scholars and aspiring scholars of DLSU-D. Seeking to beat the record set by China after it formed a giant human smiley with 3,099 participants in 2016, Lasallians made their own bid for the record with some 6,000 Lasallians forming the image of Saint Jean-Baptiste de La Salle, the university name as well as the #300LaSalle which signifies the 300th death anniversary of the Father Founder. The event is made more significant as it was celebrated with the Feast Day of St. La Salle. The event is also consistent with Lasallian institutions all around the world making their own human formations of the image of Saint Jean-Baptiste de La Salle as part of the Humans of St. La Salle initiative.

== Notable alumni ==
- Marian Rivera - actress
- Arny Ross Roque - actress
- Diether Ocampo - actor
- Jodi Sta. Maria - actress
- Roxanne Guinoo - actress
- Miguel Tanfelix - actor
- Mark Herras - actor, dancer
- Sunshine Dizon - actress
- Christian Bables - actor
- Honey Lacuna - Mayor of Manila
- Casimiro Ynares III - Mayor of Antipolo City
- Kiko Barzaga - Member of the Philippine House of Representatives from Cavite's 4th district
