= De La Salle Brothers Philippine District =

Catholic organization in the Philippines

Logo of the De La Salle Brothers Philippine District

The De La Salle Brothers - Philippine District is part of the Institute of the Brothers of the Christian Schools, the largest congregation of Roman Catholic religious Brothers who are exclusively dedicated to education. The Institute was founded in Reims, France in 1680, with over 75,000 De La Salle Christian Brothers together with lay colleagues established globally 1,500 Catholic, Lasallian educational institutions worldwide in 82 countries.

== Background ==
In the aftermath of the Philippine Revolution against Spain and the Philippine–American War, which immediately followed, the Protestant denomination, first introduced by the new American colonial masters and aided by the newly arrived American teachers, the Thomasites, was gaining a foothold among Filipinos because of the then strong anti-Spanish Friar sentiment existing at that time. Due to the then very small number of Catholic educational institutions in the country, the then American Archbishop of Manila Jeremiah James Harty, himself an alumnus of a De La Salle Christian Brothers school in St. Louis, Missouri, would appeal to the Superior-General of the Christian Brothers in 1905 for the establishment of a De La Salle school in the Philippines. While there was growing pressure for a De La Salle school, Archbishop Harty's request was rejected, because of the Christian Brothers' lack of funds. Nonetheless, Manila Archbishop Harty continued to appeal to Pope Pius X for the much-needed establishment of additional Catholic schools in the country.

== History ==
=== Arrival in the Philippines ===
The nine pioneer Brothers at Paco

On March 10, 1911, upon instructions from the Vatican to the La Salle Generalate, Brothers Blimond Pierre from France (who would serve as the school's first director), Aloysius Gonzaga, and Augusto Correge, arrived in the Philippines from Europe. Six other De La Salle Christian Brothers arrived between March and June: Brothers Louis, Camillus, B. Joseph, Celba John, Imar William, and Martin. The Christian Brothers came from the United States, Ireland, Luxembourg, and France.

Together, on June 16, 1911, the Christian Brothers opened the first La Salle school in the country. The location is at the former Perez-Samanillo Compound on 652 Calle Nozaleda in Paco, Manila. The school was first attended by 100 students.

=== Reactions from the locals ===
The initial perception of Filipinos about the then newly arrived De La Salle Christian Brothers was that they were no different from the Spanish Friars who were previously the sole handlers of Philippine education for almost three hundred years. Over time, the De La Salle Christian Brothers established their religious vocation as being a group of full-time religious educators who have consecrated their lives to God with the mission of providing Christian education to the vulnerable youth, especially the lost, the least, and the last around the world.

In 1921, the Brothers transferred the school from its original site in Paco, Manila to the then-wooded newly constructed Taft Avenue in Malate, Manila because of the increasing school population. During this time, the Christian Brothers' devotion to education would be recognized by the numerous visits of heads of state to De La Salle and by the proclamation of De La Salle College as the Philippine Islands' Premier School for Boys by Dr. Paul Monroe and a commission of American educators, after an eight-month cross-country inspection of existing Philippine schools in the 1930s.

=== The February 12, 1945 massacre ===
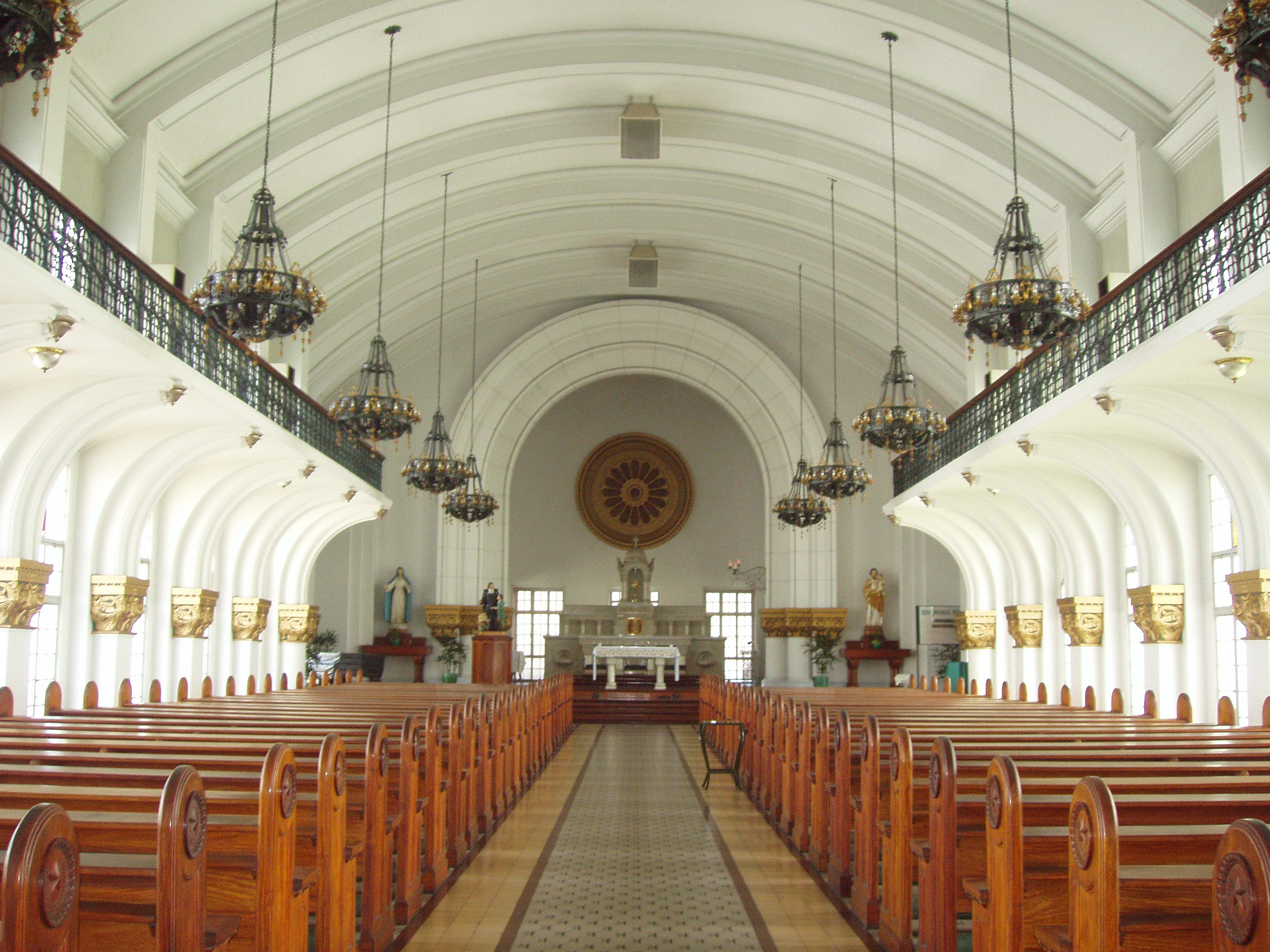
After the war, the school chapel, formerly dedicated to St. Joseph, was blessed and re-dedicated to the Most Blessed Sacrament

On February 12, 1945, a Japanese Army officer along with 20 soldiers forcibly made their way into the college, which was then a refuge for 70 people, including 30 women and young girls, 16 European De La Salle Christian Brothers (all the pre-war American De La Salle Christian Brothers had been interned in the Los Baños Concentration Camp) and the college's chaplain-Redemptorist Father Cosgrave CSSR (an Australian), and the adult men of two families. Two days earlier, De La Salle College Director-Brother Egbert Xavier Kelly FSC (an Irishman) was abducted by another group of Japanese soldiers, and was never seen again.

After the Japanese troops herded all the people into the school chapel, they were then subsequently shot, slashed, or bayoneted. Those who did not die in the attack were left to bleed to death. The Japanese attempted to rape some of the dying women. The chapel was then set on fire, but it was not destroyed because it was built of marble and concrete. Only 10 people survived, including one De La Salle Brother. Brother Antonius is the name of the surviving Christian Brother.

The 1939-built De La Salle Main Chapel is one of the few structures to survive the destruction of Southern Manila during the Manila massacres in February 1945.

The following are those who were massacred in February 1945 by the Japanese:

- De La Salle Christian Brothers

• Brother Egbert Xavier Kelly FSC – Director
• Brother Flavius Leo FSC
• Brother Alemond Lucian FSC
• Brother Baptist De La Salle Janos FSC
• Brother Adolf Gebhard FSC
• Brother Berthwin Philibert FSC
• Brother Arkadius Maria FSC
• Brother Friedbert Johannes FSC

• Brother Gerfried Joseph FSC
• Brother Lambert Romanus FSC
• Brother Mutwald William FSC
• Brother Paternus Paul FSC
• Brother Romuald Sixtus FSC
• Brother Hartmann Hubert FSC
• Brother Maximin Maria FSC
• Brother Victorinus Heinrich FSC

- The Carlos Family
  - Jose
  - Juanita
  - Asela
  - Cecilia
  - Antonio
  - Mateo (surname unknown)
- The Cojuangco Family
  - Antonio, M.D.
  - Victoria Uychuico
  - Natividad de las Alas
  - Antonio
  - Ricardo Bartolome
  - Carlos (surname unknown)
  - Apolinario (surname unknown)
- The Aquino Family
  - Trinidad Cojuangco
- The Kahn Family
  - Pierre
  - Josephine
- The Uychuico Family
  - Clemente, M.D.
  - Ramon
- The Vasquez-Prada Family
  - Enrique Sr.
  - Helen Loewinsohn
  - Enrique Jr.
  - Herman
  - Alonso
  - Armenia (surname unknown)
- College employees
  - Anselmo Sudlan
  - Pamphilio Almodan
  - Ceferino Villamor

== The Philippine District ==
Brother Visitors of the Philippine District
Br. Justin Lucian FSC, 1970
Br. Benildo Feliciano FSC, 1970-1976
Br. Rolando Dizon FSC, 1976-1977
Br. Victor Franco FSC, 1977-1983
Br. Rafael Donato FSC, 1983-1990
Br. Raymundo Suplido FSC, 1990-1993
Br. Benildo Feliciano FSC, 1993-1997
Br. Armin Luistro FSC, 1997-2003
Br. Edmundo Fernandez FSC, 2003-incumbent

Up until the 1960s, the Christian Brothers in the Philippines was a sub-district (Province) of the De La Salle Institute District of San Francisco and thereafter, up to the establishment of the Philippine District in 1970. On February 2, 1970, the Philippine Province became an independent District of the Institute, to be known as the De La Salle Christian Brothers in the Philippines. At present, the sub-district of Myanmar is under the Philippine District.

=== The Brother Visitor ===
The Brother Visitor is the official title of the head of a particular District of the Christian Brothers, although for purposes of communication with non-members of the La Sallian family, the title, Brother Provincial is used because of its commonality with the title used to describe the district heads of other religious congregations.

The Brother Visitor is the person responsible for assigning Brothers to their communities and providing for the different posts of responsibility as deemed necessary by the District Chapter. He is also responsible for admitting candidates to the Novitiate as well as the making of vows. Also, as specified in canon law, he is authorized to issue writings on matters of religion or morality.

The Philippine District has had eight Brother Visitors, who are elected for three-year terms. The first was Brother Justin Lucian FSC, who was elected in 1970 and was also the last Auxiliary Visitor from the Baltimore District. The incumbent is Brother Edmundo Fernandez FSC.
