= Rex v. Chisser =

1678 English criminal law case

Rex v. Chisser (1678)
- Court: Court of King's Bench
- Decided: 1678
- Defendant: Chisser
- Plaintiff: Not specified
- Citation: T. Ryan 275, 83 Eng. Rep. 142

Case history
- Subsequent actions: The case involved a merchant handing merchandise to Chisser, who then ran out of the shop without agreeing to a price. The court found that, despite the physical possession by Chisser, the property was still in legal possession of the merchant because there was no completed contract for the transfer.

Court membership
- Judge sitting: Not specified

Case opinions
- The act of running with the merchandise was considered to demonstrate felonious intent.

Rex v. Chisser, Court of King's Bench (1678), T. Ryan 275, 83 Eng. Rep. 142, is a criminal case interpreting possession and criminal intent in larceny. A merchant handed merchandise to Chisser, who then haggled over the price then ran out of the shop with the merchandise without agreeing to a price. At the time, common law was that larceny required a trespass to acquire possession. Although the property was handed to Chisser, the court found that although the merchant gave physical possession to Chisser, the property was still in legal possession by the merchant because there was no completed contract for the transfer in that the price was still being negotiated, and the act of running proved the felonious intent (felleo animo).
