= Andrew Gonzales =

Andrew Gonzales may refer to:

- Andrew Gonzalez, Lasallian brother
- Andrew Gonzales (drummer), known for drumming with the band Reel Big Fish
- Andy González (baseball), baseball player
