= Rolando Ramos Dizon =

Brother Rolando R. Dizon FSC

President of De La Salle University
- In office 1998–2003
- Preceded by: Bro. Andrew Gonzalez, F.S.C.
- Succeeded by: Carmelita Quebengco

President of Taguig City University (2010)

President of the De La Salle University System (1998–2003)

Personal details
- Born: October 31, 1944 Bacolod, Negros Occidental, Commonwealth of the Philippines
- Died: April 25, 2012 (aged 67) Dasmariñas, Cavite, Philippines

Brother Rolando Ramos Dizon FSC (October 31, 1944 – April 25, 2012) was a Filipino De La Salle Brother who was the President of De La Salle University and the De La Salle University System from 1998 to 2003, Chairman of the Commission on Higher Education from March 2003 to September 2004, Director-at-Large of the Catholic Educational Association of the Philippines from 1998 to 2003, and Acting Brother Visitor of the De La Salle Brothers in the Philippines from 1976 to 1977 as well as a member of President Gloria Macapagal Arroyo's Consultative Commission on Charter Change from September to October 2005.

He was an Associate Professorial Lecturer of the Educational Leadership and Management Department of the De La Salle University-Manila College of Education. He was assigned to Bethlehem University, a De La Salle school in Palestine from August 2008 to June 2009. He was assigned to De La Salle University Manila until his death.

== Life ==
Dizon was born in Bacolod, Negros Occidental, Philippines, on October 31, 1944, to Raymundo L. Dizon of Porac, Pampanga, and Hermelinda V. Ramos of Negros Occidental. Dizon was the fifth of six children.

=== Education ===
When La Salle College opened in Bacolod in 1952, Rolando was enrolled as a Grade Three student. He finished grade school in 1957 as valedictorian of his class, and high school in 1961 as valedictorian and student council president. Encouraged by Br. Francis Cody and by Br. Andrew Gonzalez, his former high school teacher in Bacolod, Dizon entered the La Salle Brothers' Postulancy right after high school. He made his first vows on October 11, 1962.

He studied his first two years of college at De La Salle College in Manila. He continued his undergraduate studies at The Catholic University of America U.S.A. from 1965, graduating with a Bachelor of Arts degree in mathematics in 1968. He then took his Master of Arts degree in education administration at De La Salle University Manila, and took his Doctorate degree in international development education at the Stanford Graduate School of Education.

Dizon's first assignment after returning to the Philippines was in La Salle Green Hills, where he taught mathematics and religion in the high school department for a year before being appointed grade school principal in 1969, high school principal in 1971 and acting president in 1973.

=== Awards and legacy ===
In 2006, Dizon was given the Distinguished Lasallian Award by the De La Salle Alumni Association in De La Salle University-Manila. In March 2007, he was inducted in the De La Salle Sports Hall of Fame. In recognition of his contribution to promoting global education, DLSU System President Bro. Rolando Dizon, FSC was conferred honorary professor by Anhui University during his visit to Anhui, China. The title was the highest honor given to an educator in the country, entitled the Brother President to teach at said university at any given time.

== See also ==
- List of people from De La Salle University-Manila

Academic offices
Preceded by Dr. Ester A. Garcia	Chairman of the Commission on Higher Education; 2003-2004	Succeeded by Fr. Rolando de la Rosa, O.P.
Preceded by Bro. Andrew Gonzalez, F.S.C.	President of De La Salle University-Manila and the De La Salle University System; 1998-2003	Succeeded by Dr. Carmelita I. Quebengco; Interim President
Preceded by Bro. Benildo Feliciano, F.S.C.	Brother Visitor of the De La Salle Brothers in the Philippines; In an Acting capacity 1976-1977	Succeeded by Bro. Victor Franco, F.S.C.
