= De La Salle University =

Roman Catholic university in Manila, Philippines

- Pamantasang De La Salle (Filipino)
- Other name: De La Salle or La Salle
- Former names: De La Salle College (1911–1975)
- Motto: Religio, Mores, Cultura (Latin)
- Motto in English: Religion, Morals, Culture
- Type: Private, research, non-stock, coeducational higher education institution
- Established: June 16, 1911 (115 years and 152 days)
- Founder: Institute of the Brothers of the Christian Schools
- Religious affiliation: Roman Catholic
- Academic affiliations: ACUCA; ASAIHL; ASEACCU; AUN; IALU; IAU; IFCU; PATE; SMIIC; UBCHEA; UNCOFIN
- Chairman: Fortunato T. de la Peña
- President: Br. Bernard S. Oca, FSC
- Academic staff: 1,432 (A.Y. 2025–26)
- Students: 26,747 (A.Y. 2025–26)
- Undergraduates: 23,574 (A.Y. 2025–26)
- Postgraduates: 3,173 (A.Y. 2025–26)
- Campus: Main: Manila: Urban 2401 Taft Avenue, Manila, Metro Manila, Philippines 5.45 hectares (54,500 m^{2}) Satellite: Makati: Urban RCBC Plaza, Makati, Metro Manila, Philippines Rufino: Urban University Parkway, Bonifacio Global City, Taguig, Metro Manila, Philippines 0.14 hectares (1,400 m^{2}) Laguna: Suburban LTI Spine Road, Biñan, Laguna, Philippines 50 hectares (500,000 m^{2}) Lian: Suburban Sitio Matuod, Binubusan, Lian, Batangas, Philippines 1 hectare (10,000 m^{2})
- Student moniker: Lasallian (English), Lasalyano/Lasalista (Filipino)
- Acceptance Rate: 37.95% (2022)
- Colors: Green and white
- Nickname: Green Archers
- Sporting affiliations: UAAP; PCCL; PFFWL; UNIGAMES; AsiaBasket; PBA D-League; Filoil EcoOil Sports
- Mascots: Archers named Gordo, Flaco, and Sally
- Website: www.dlsu.edu.ph

De La Salle Alma Mater
- De La Salle University Chorale and produced by the De La Salle-College of Saint Benilde-Center for Institutional Communications (Benilde-CIC): file; help
- Location in Manila Location in Metro Manila Location in Luzon Location in the Philippines

De La Salle University (DLSU; Filipino: Pamantasang De La Salle) is a private Catholic research university run by the Institute of the Brothers of the Christian Schools with its main campus on Taft Avenue, Malate, Manila, Philippines. It was established by the Christian Brothers in 1911 as De La Salle College (DLSC) in Nozaleda Street, Paco, Manila with Br. Blimond Pierre Eilenbecker, FSC serving as director, and is the first De La Salle school in the Philippines. The college was granted university status on February 19, 1975, and is the oldest constituent of De La Salle Philippines (DLSP), a network of 16 educational institutions, established in 2006 replacing the De La Salle University System.

The institution started as an exclusive all-boys elementary and high school. In 1920, it began offering a two-year Associate in Arts Commerce program, which was later discontinued in 1931 in favor of a Bachelor of Science in Commerce program. The patron saint of the university is St. John Baptist de La Salle, the Vatican's patron saint for those who work in education.

Logotype of De La Salle University

De La Salle University has been cited by the Philippine Commission on Higher Education (CHED) as a Center of Excellence in 14 of its programs and a Center of Development in five. The university is among 40 institutions granted autonomous status by CHED as of 2010. It is the first of only two institutions granted the highest-level accreditation (Level IV) by the Philippine Accrediting Association of Schools, Colleges and Universities (PAASCU). The university is a member of the ASEAN University Network (AUN) and International Association of Universities (IAU) as well as the local South Manila Inter-Institutional Consortium.

== History ==
The Philippines was one of the last few Southeast Asian countries in which the De La Salle Christian Brothers established themselves. The De La Salle Christian Brothers had established several De La Salle schools in British and French Southeast Asian colonial territories a century before settling in the new American colony. Initially, the De La Salle Brothers were reluctant in establishing a school in the Philippines due to the Americans' insistence that the first school should only educate the children of the ruling Filipino elite. The Americans instructed the Christian Brothers to Americanize future Filipino leaders through their Catholic Lasallian education. The American demand ran contrary to the original spiritual teachings and charism of St. John Baptist de La Salle, the Vatican's patron saint of Christian educators whose main religious vocation was to "Teach Minds, Touch Hearts and Transform Lives" while providing tuition-free education to the poor. The De La Salle Christian Brothers eventually agreed to establish a school in Manila, conceding that the "upper-class children of the ruling elite families also needed good Catholic moral and spiritual training."

De La Salle University traces its founding roots to Manila Archbishop Jeremiah James Harty. Harty, an alumnus of a Christian Brother–Lasallian school in St. Louis, Missouri, believed that the establishment of a De La Salle school in Manila would be instrumental in preempting the spread of Protestantism in the Philippines through the arrival of the Thomasites and American Protestant church missions. His request was endorsed in 1907 by Pope Pius X. An envoy of the De La Salle Christian Brothers arrived in 1910. Together with Manila Archbishop Harty, the Christian Brothers searched for a suitable campus location. A 13,000-square-meter (140,000 sq ft) property in Nozaleda Street, Paco, Manila was purchased for this purpose.

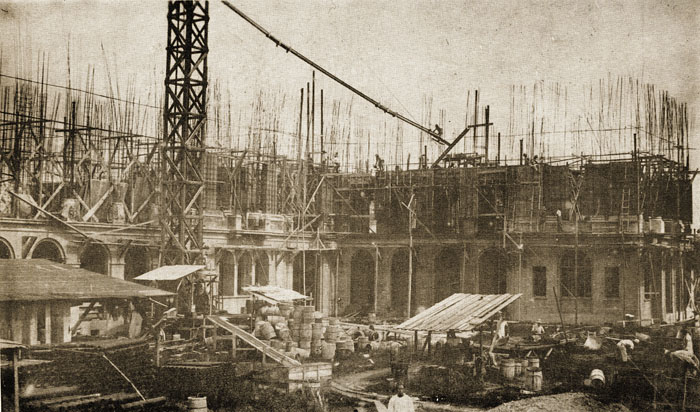
Construction of St. La Salle Hall c. 1921

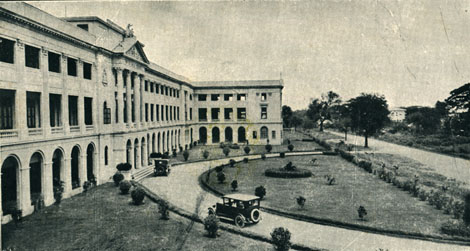
St. La Salle Hall c. 1925

=== Early history ===
De La Salle College was established by nine De La Salle Christian Brothers. Three, Blimond Pierre Eilenbecker, Aloysius Gonzaga McGiverin, and Augusto Correge, arrived on March 10, 1911, and the remaining six, Ptolomee Louis Duffaux, Goslin Camillus Henri, D. Joseph, Celba John Lynam, Imar William Reale, and Martin, on May 13. De La Salle College formally opened on June 16, 1911, with 125 students. By July 10, the number of students reached 175.

On February 12, 1912, the college was incorporated under the sole ownership of the college director, Br. Eilenbecker. In March 1912, four more Brothers arrived, Wilfrid, Basilian Coin, Dorotheus Joseph, and Egbert Xavier Kelly. The college was permitted to confer high school diplomas in the same year. It received a charter from the Governor-General of the Philippines, allowing the college to confer associate degrees in commerce. It started offering the degree as a two-year program in 1920. Brothers Donatian Felix, V. Andrew, Albinus Peter, Flavius Leo, Alphonsus Henry, Felix and David King were sent to the school to teach various subjects from 1917 to 1929.

The college had 425 students by 1921. Due to the lack of space on the original Nozaleda Campus in Paco, Manila, it moved to 2401 Taft Avenue in Malate, its present location. Brother Acisclus Michael, FSC was able to secure a 30,300-square-meter (326,000 sq ft) lot at the southernmost boundary of Manila. In 1931, the college discontinued its two-year commerce program in favor of a three-year Bachelor of Science in Commerce program, which was approved a year earlier.

=== World War II ===
During the Second World War, the American De La Salle Christian Brothers were interred in the Japanese Los Baños Internment Camp for the duration of the three-year Japanese occupation of the Philippines while the other non-American Brothers were allowed to stay on and continue to teach at the Taft Campus.

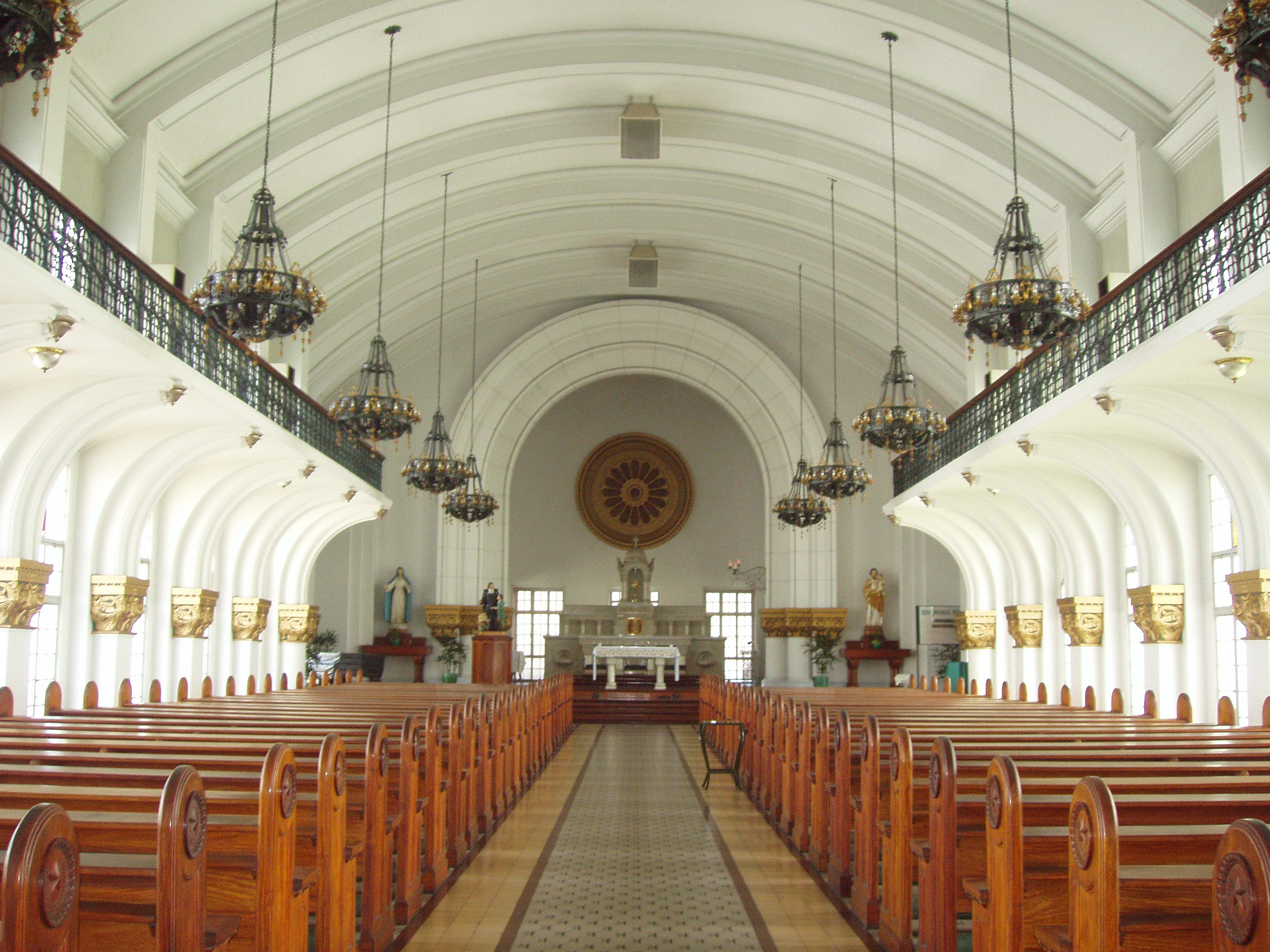
The Chapel of the Most Blessed Sacrament on the southwestern wing of St. La Salle Hall

Initially, the De La Salle campus served as a secret shelter for several displaced civilians, nearby families, wounded soldiers, and some Filipino guerrilla freedom fighters at the beginning of the Japanese occupation. However, it was occupied by the Imperial Japanese Army and made into military defense quarters on January 2, 1942. Several bombings severely damaged the DLSC campus. Despite this, classes continued during the Japanese occupation. During this time, several Lasallians set their sports rivalries aside to share their De La Salle College classrooms with students from various neighboring schools in and around Manila. The DLSC high school classes were later transferred to its neighbor St. Scholastica's College, Manila in 1943.

Classes were eventually discontinued at the De La Salle campus by the end of 1944. On February 1, 1945, as the war was coming to a close, retreating Japanese forces ordered the occupants of the DLSC and the surrounding vicinity to vacate the college. However, Br. Egbert Xavier Kelly, FSC refused the order to vacate. On February 7, 1945, he was abducted by Japanese soldiers and was believed to have been tortured and killed. On February 12, shortly after noon, 20 Japanese soldiers forcibly entered the DLSC campus and massacred 16 of the 17 De La Salle Brothers residing in the chapel of the campus, along with 25 other residents. Only one Brother (Antonius von Jesus) and 21 others survived.

=== Post–war period ===
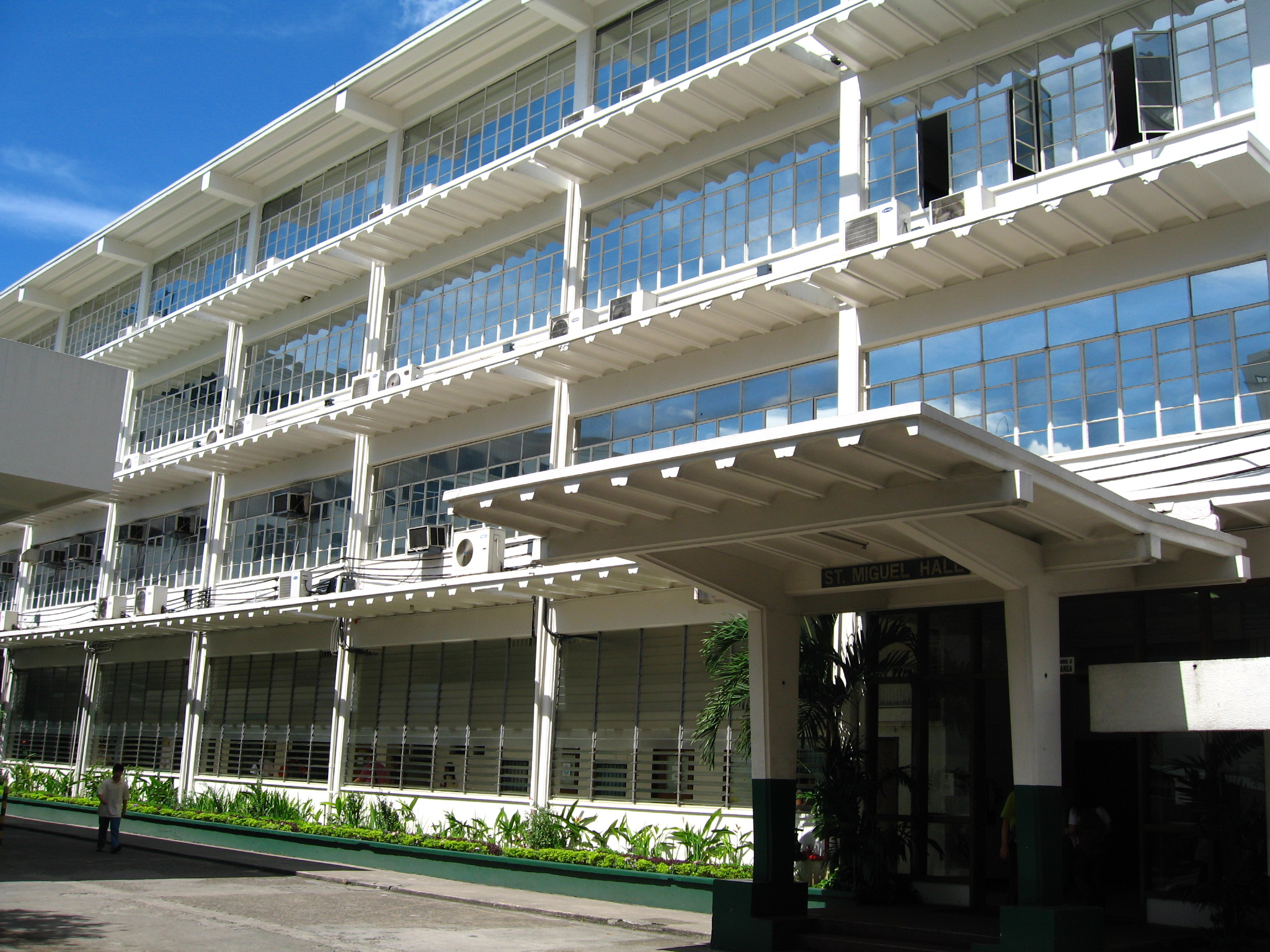
St. Miguel Hall (formerly St. Benilde Hall)

Classes resumed in July 1945 with a class of incoming freshmen that was composed of 60 high school graduates. One year later, the College of Commerce reopened with its three-year BS Commerce program extended to a four-year program.

The High School Department of De La Salle College on Taft Avenue, Manila, was dissolved in 1968 and transferred to La Salle Green Hills on Ortigas Avenue, Mandaluyong, which was then a part of Rizal province.

The College of Commerce, together with Ateneo de Manila University, gave birth to the Asian Institute of Management in the same year with assistance from the Ford Foundation and Harvard University. Several other units were established in the following years.

=== During the Martial Law era ===
The school continued to change even as the nation went through the difficulties of the Marcos dictatorship era. It became co-educational in 1973. On February 19, 1975, De La Salle College was granted university status and became known as De La Salle University (DLSU). Since 2008, it has referred to itself as De La Salle University, its registered name in the Philippine Securities and Exchange Commission. The Grade School Department was deprecated in 1978.

In 1981, De La Salle University shifted from the traditional semestral academic calendar to a trimestral one. Prior to this, students were referred to as Lasallites, but this was replaced with Lasallian, the present term.

In comparison to other schools in the capital, where massive protests were typical, the De La Salle campus was relatively quiet during the First Quarter Storm and Martial Law years. However, there were some constituents who were active in the resistance against the Marcos dictatorship, even in its early years. At one point, soldiers went into the campus hunting for student activist (and later La Sallian editor in chief) William Chua, who was forced to hide in the trunk of a sympathetic faculty member's car. Outside of the campus, a number of alumni actively resisted the regime, such as prominent businessman and De La Salle high school alumnus Alfonso Yuchengco, who became an important part of the Light-A-Fire Movement.

The broader student population became more active in protests against the authoritarian regime in 1983, becoming part of what was called the "middle force opposition" that grew across the nation after the Assassination of Ninoy Aquino. A particular leader during this time was Immanuel "Imo" Obispo, a student activist who was a junior when he was killed under mysterious circumstances in October 1984.

Chua, Yuchengco, and Obispo are all honored at the Philippines' Bantayog ng mga Bayani memorial, which honors the martyrs and heroes of the resistance against the authoritarian regime of Ferdinand Marcos.

=== Later 20th century ===
In 1987, the university, together with four other Lasallian institutions, became part of the De La Salle University System. The system was later dissolved in favor of De La Salle Philippines, a network of 16 Lasallian institutions. De La Salle–College of Saint Benilde (DLS–CSB) became independent of the university in 1988.

=== Recent history ===
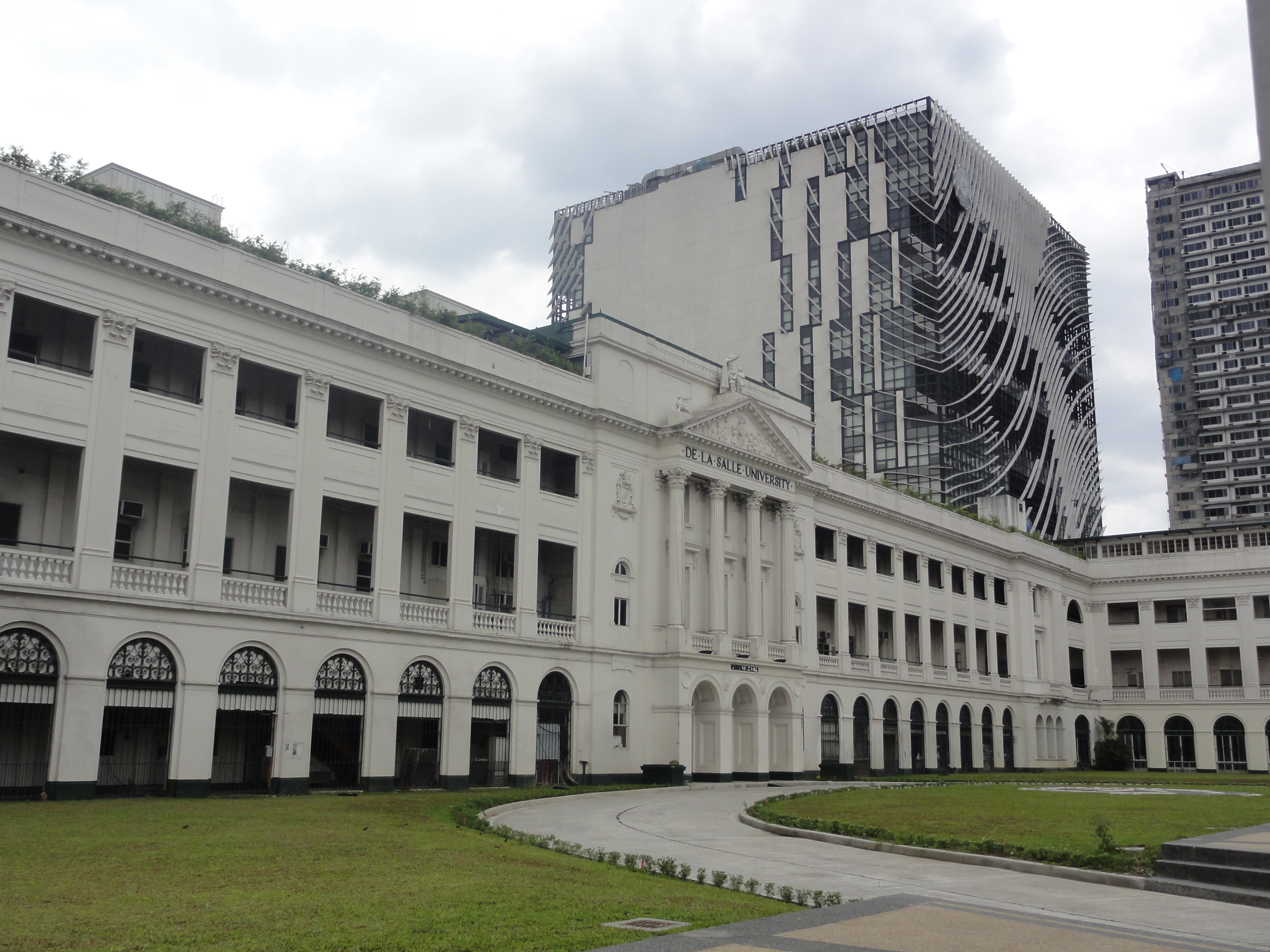
St. La Salle Hall in 2014 (with Henry Sy Sr. Hall in the background)

A Mk 2 grenade was detonated outside the southern portion of the DLSU campus in front of a popular burger shop along Taft Avenue on September 26, 2010, at around 5:05 pm by opposing rival Law fraternities, the same day as the Philippine Bar exams conducted by the university. The blast injured 47 individuals, two of whom required limbs to be amputated. Anthony Leal Nepomuceno was indicted by the Philippine Department of Justice on April 29, 2011, on the charge of detonating the device.

In 2012, De La Salle Canlubang was formally integrated with De La Salle University and became an extension of DLSU. It was inaugurated as the De La Salle University – Science & Technology Complex (DLSU–STC), and later renamed as the De La Salle University – Laguna Campus. In 2015, DLSU announced that it would open its Manila campus for senior high school students in response to the K–12 implementation. The Senior High School (SHS) classes officially opened on June 1, 2016. In December 2018, DLSU announced its plan to launch a new Learning Management System (LMS) called AnimoSpace, built based on the Canvas LMS software. AnimoSpace was officially launched on January 15, 2019.

== Campuses ==
=== Manila ===
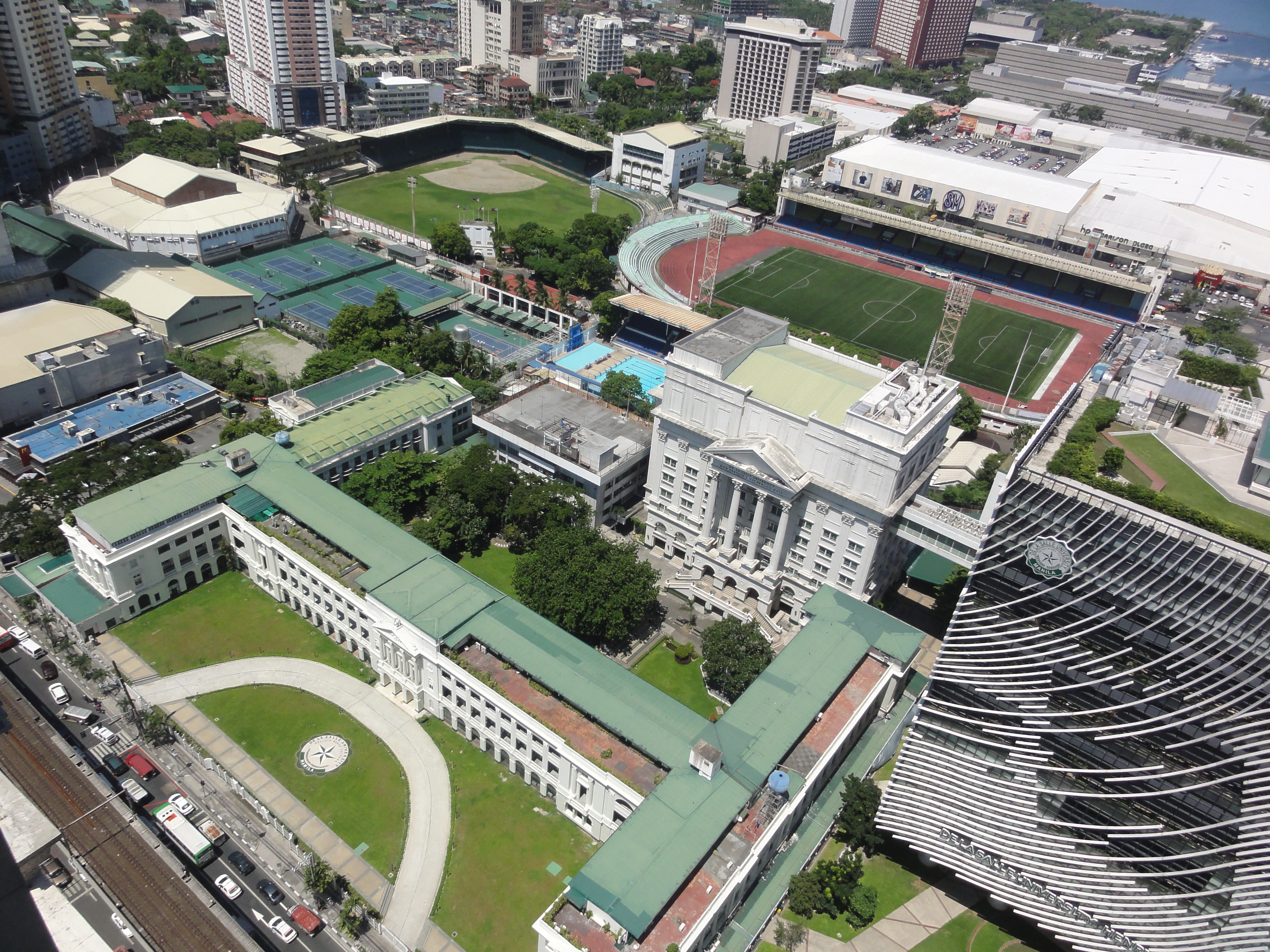
An aerial shot of the DLSU Manila Campus and the Rizal Memorial Sports Complex

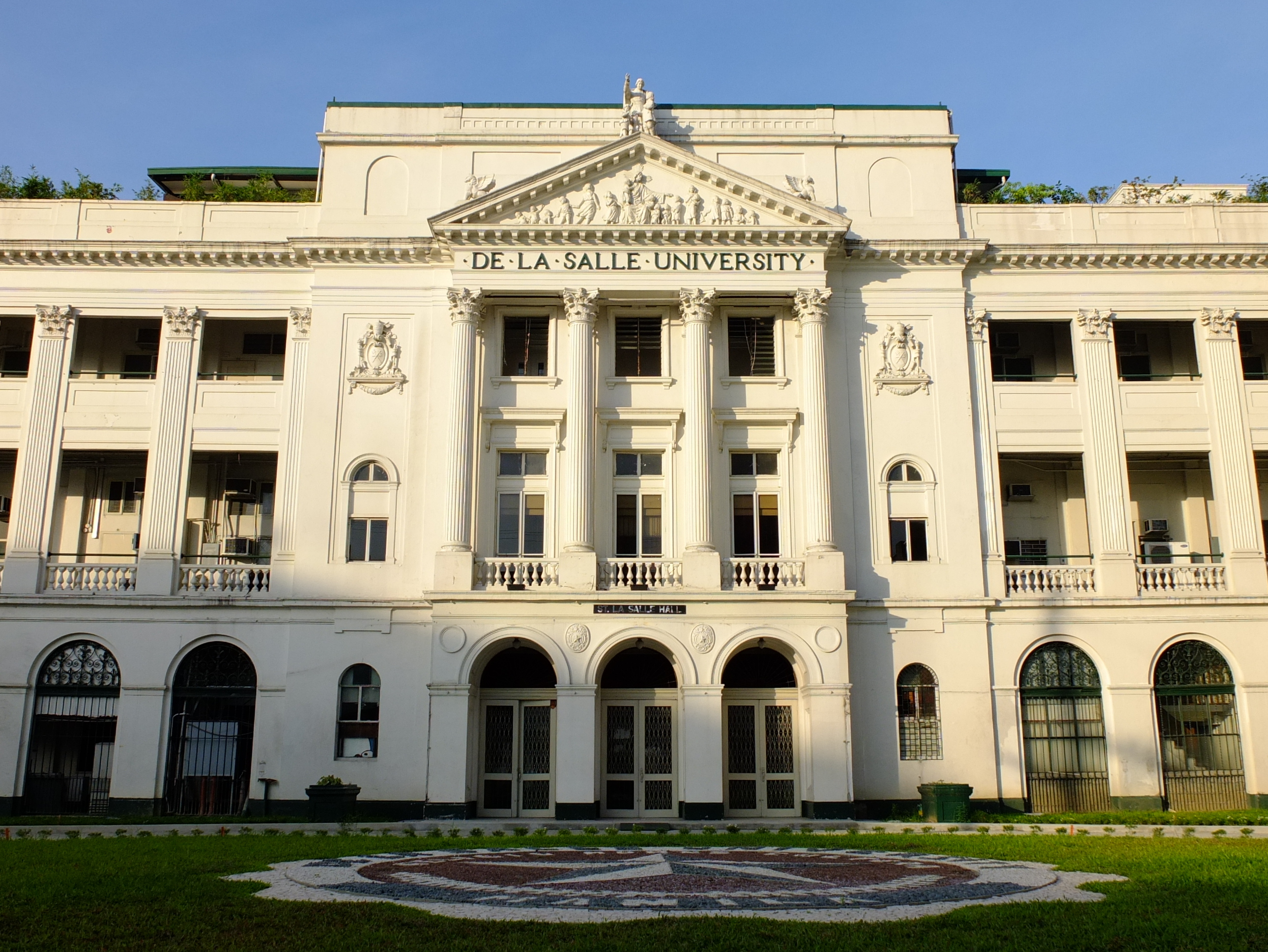
St. La Salle Hall

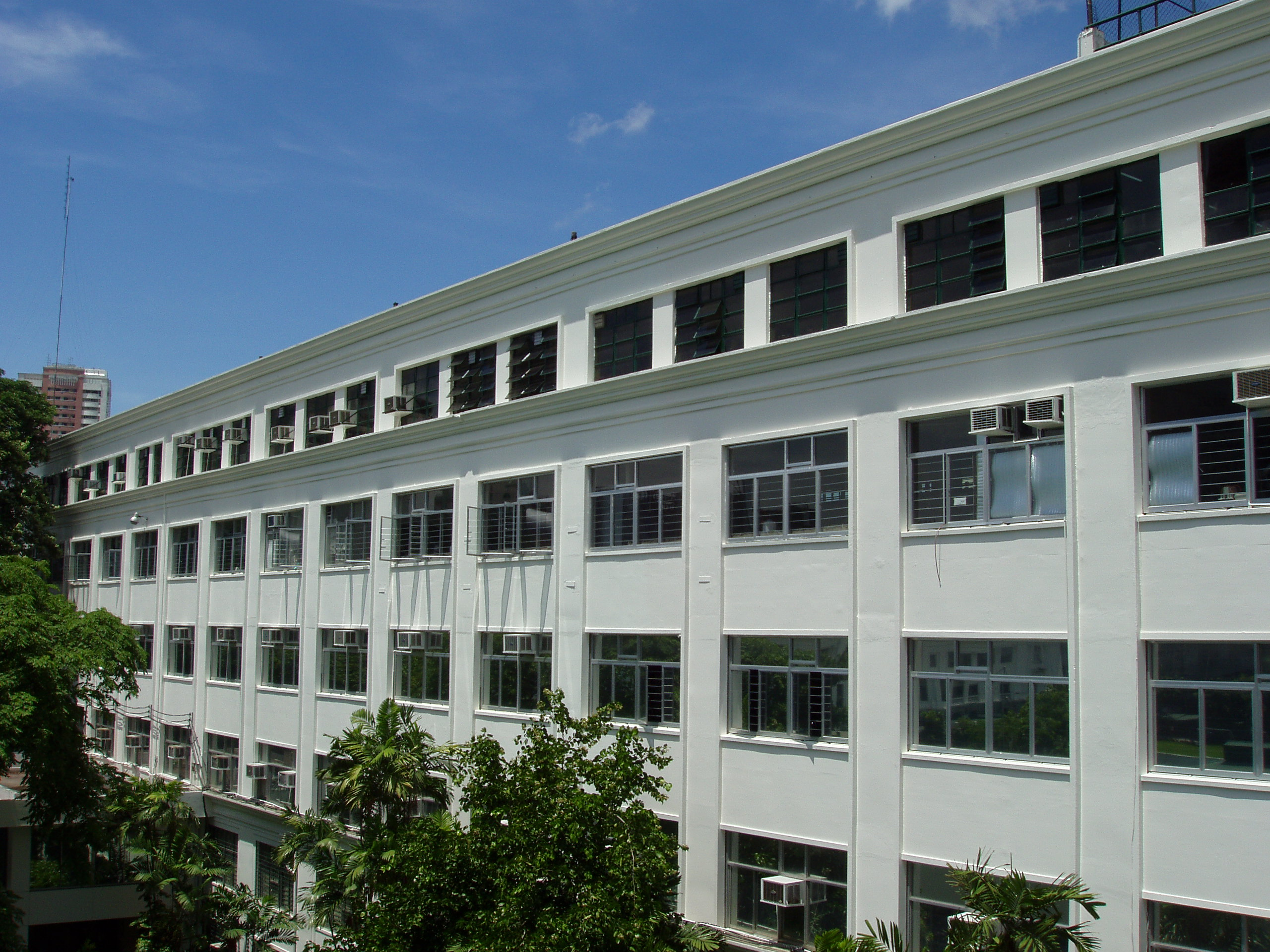
St. Joseph Hall

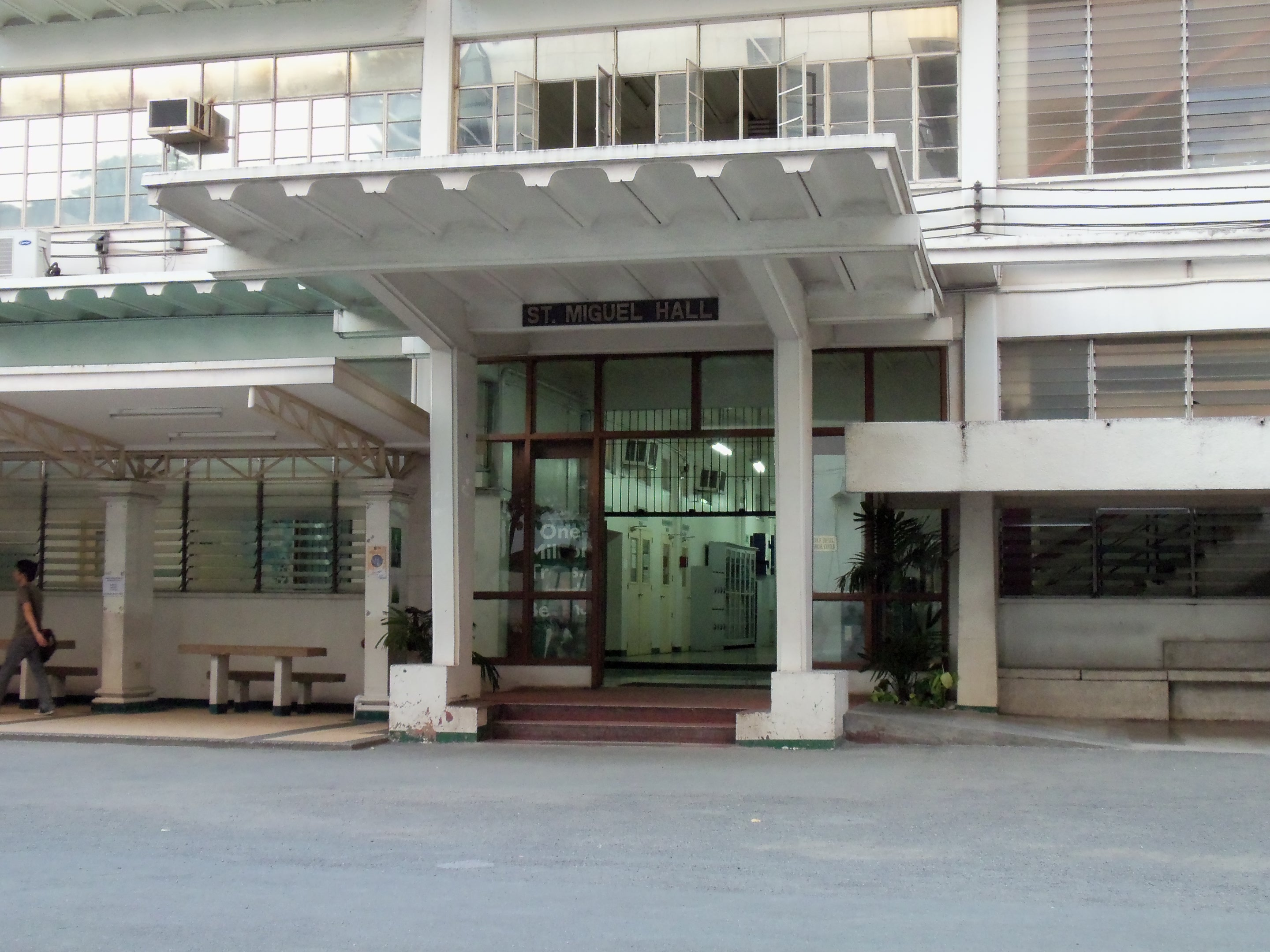
St. Miguel Hall

Velasco Hall

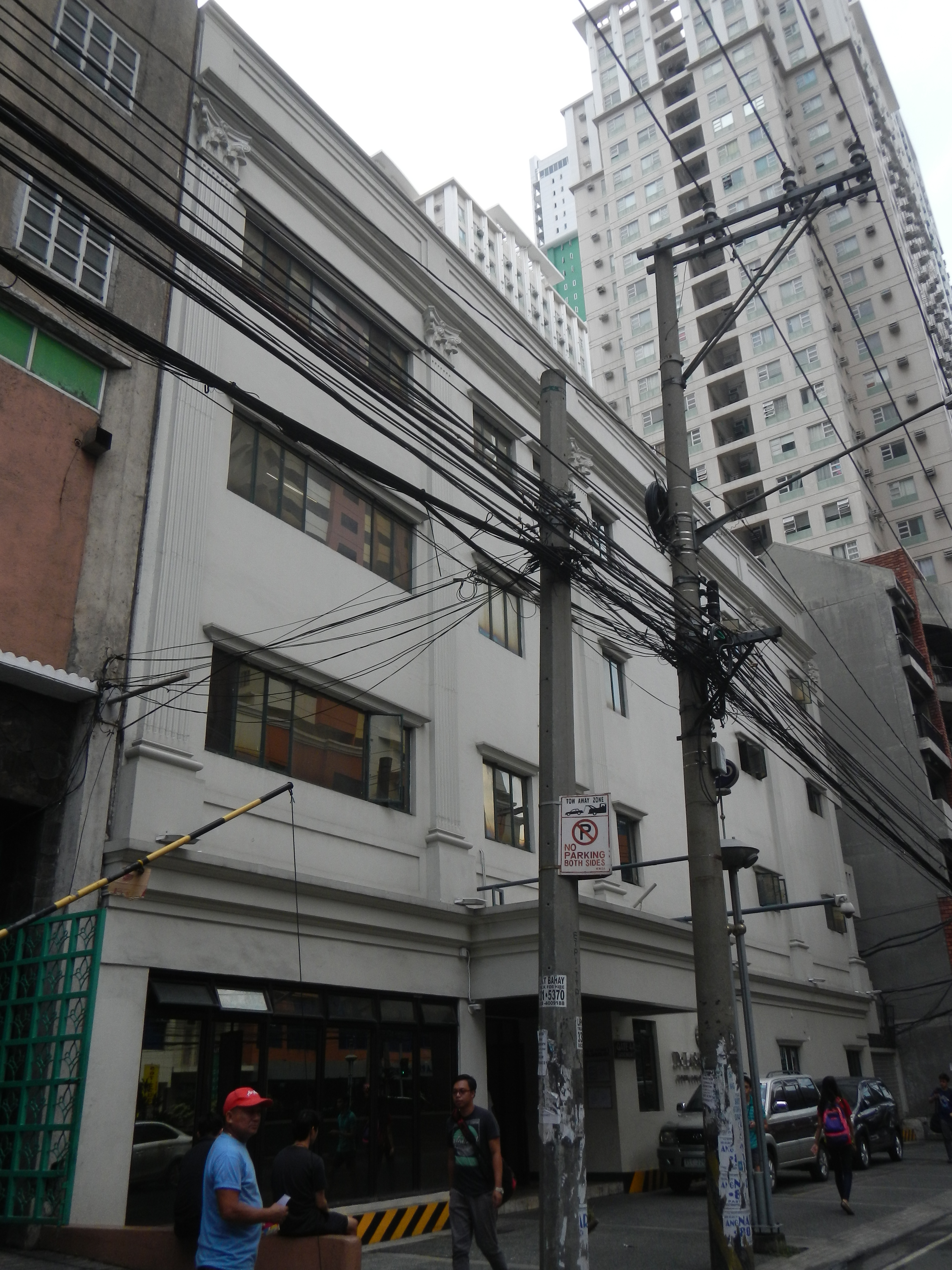
Gokongwei Hall

Yuchengco Hall

The main campus is situated on a 5.45-hectare (13.5-acre) lot at 2401 Taft Avenue, Malate, Manila. It is part of the University Belt with several other colleges and universities, including St. Scholastica's College, Manila and Philippine Women's University, which are both located nearby. Some buildings that are part of the campus are also situated at other nearby lots along Taft Avenue and at the nearby Fidel Reyes Street, formerly named Agno Street.

The buildings have a combined floor area of 136,685.98 m^{2} (1,471,275.6 sq ft). Six of the DLSU Manila campus buildings – Br. Andrew Gonzalez Hall, Don Enrique T. Yuchengco Hall, Enrique M. Razon Sports Center, Gokongwei Hall, Henry Sy Sr. Hall, and Velasco Hall – were funded and provided by DLSU alumni. Most of the buildings in the DLSU campus feature neoclassical design. These include:

- St. La Salle Hall, the first building on the campus. A four-story building, its construction started in 1921 and was completed in 1924. The classic H-shaped LS main building was designed by Cornell University alumnus Tomás Mapúa, the first Filipino registered architect and subsequent founder of Mapúa Institute of Technology. St. La Salle Hall was one of the very few buildings that survived the near total destruction of Manila during the 1945 Battle of Manila. It has undergone retrofitting since 2011, and was completed in 2012. It is the only Philippine structure featured in 1001 Buildings You Must See Before You Die: The World's Architectural Masterpieces, a book published by Quintessence Editions Ltd. in 2007. St. La Salle Hall also houses the College of Business and School of Economics.
- St. Joseph Hall, a six-story building completed in 1956. It was the location of the DLSU library from 1956 to 1985. It houses the College of Science and DLSU's Discipline Office.
- St. Miguel Febres Cordero Hall, a four-story building completed in 1969. Originally known as the St. Benilde Hall, it was renamed in 1989 and houses the College of Liberal Arts, academic offices, and some laboratories belonging to the College of Engineering.
- Urbano J. Velasco Hall, a five-story building completed in 1981. It houses the College of Engineering.
- Don Enrique T. Yuchengco Hall, a nine-story building completed in 2002. The building has 20 classrooms, six conference rooms, DLSU's administrative offices and the Teresa G. Yuchengco Auditorium.
- John Gokongwei Sr. Hall, a four-story building completed in the 1990s. Originally named the INTELLECT (Information Technology Lecture) Building, the building houses the College of Computer Studies, the university's Information Technology Services (ITS) facilities, National Service Training Program and Formations Office, and 24-hour study hall. The ground floor of the building underwent renovation from 2019 to 2021, which included additional classrooms and study spaces.
- William J. Shaw Hall, a seven-story building that houses the College of Science and the William Shaw Little Theater.
- Br. Gabriel Connon Hall, a five-story building that houses the university clinic, Waldo Perfecto Seminar Room, discussion rooms, and office of various university departments and student organizations.
- Br. Alphonsus Bloemen Hall, a building that houses food stalls and the studio of Green Giant FM.
- Br. Celba John Hall, a three-story building south of St. La Salle Hall that houses the offices of foundations and non-government organizations including De La Salle University Science Foundation, Inc. and DLSU-Parents of the University Students Organization (DLSU-PUSO).
- Br. Andrew Gonzalez Hall, a 20-story, 90-meter (300 ft) tall building, making it the tallest academic building in the Philippines. The building, completed in 2006, houses more than 100 classrooms and faculty rooms, a satellite library called Br. Benedict Learning Resource Center, the Natividad Fajardo–Rosario Gonzalez Auditorium, a retreat facility called Center for Lasallian Formation, and offices of various colleges especially the College of Education.
- Enrique M. Razon Sports Center, a 10-story building that is the main sports facility of De La Salle University. It was built in 1998 to replace the old Br. Athanasius Sports Complex, which was demolished in 2000 to give way to the construction of the Don Enrique T. Yuchengco Hall. The Sports Center stands on a 3,155-square-meter (33,960 sq ft) lot located at the corner of Fidel Reyes (formerly named Agno) and Noli Streets. It has an Olympic-sized pool, a track and field oval with a balcony. It has basketball and volleyball courts, table tennis courts, a dance and martial arts studio, and weight training rooms. The George T. Yang Performing Arts Studios are located on the sixth floor of the building. The sixth floor also houses the Gold's Gym Taft branch which opened in late 2016.
- The Faculty Center, a four-story building built in 1985. Located behind the St. Joseph Hall, it houses the offices of departments belonging to the College of Liberal Arts and to the College of Business, respectively, and formerly the university library.
- The Science & Technology Research Center, a four-story research center along Fidel Reyes (formerly named Agno) Street that houses various research facilities and laboratories belonging to the Colleges of Science and Engineering, respectively.
- Henry Sy Sr. Hall, a 14-story building housing the academic services hub, administrative offices, and the university library, now called the Learning Commons. Construction of the Henry Sy Sr. Hall began on December 2, 2010, as part of the university's Centennial Renewal Plan. Named after its first donor and businessman Henry Sy, the building was constructed on the location of the former DLSU football field adjacent to Velasco Hall. It was completed by December 2012 and inaugurated on February 13, 2013. The project had an estimated cost of ₱1.4 billion (US$32.5 million). In line with this, DLSU entered an eight-year agreement with the Philippine Sports Commission. Under the contract, DLSU would fund the ₱7.4 billion (US$171,000) renovation of the Rizal Memorial Track and Football Stadium. DLSU would get to use the facilities in return.

The campus will also open the following facilities as part of its ongoing development:

- St. Mutien-Marie Wiaux Hall, a 10-story building behind Miguel Hall that broke ground on July 6, 2023, and topped off on July 29, 2024. It will house art and music facilities, collaboration areas, and more classrooms and offices. Expected to be complete by January 2025, it would replace its previous incarnation, which was demolished alongside the adjacent Eco/Solar Car shed. The old building was also where the university's Harlequin Theatre Guild annually stages their "Haunted Hall" production due to its reputation for its ghostly rumors.

The DLSU–Manila campus, which is relatively small in size for its large student population, suffers from limited space. According to The LaSallian, each student had only 7.1 m^{2} (76 sq ft) for himself in 2009. Crowding is expected to only get worse. It has also expressed concerns regarding fire safety, citing possible evacuation difficulties should a fire occur at the Br. Andrew Gonzalez Hall, and accessibility issues for fire trucks, given the lack of wide roads to major buildings. At least three fires have occurred in the campus, including two at St. Joseph Hall. To address the problem of limited space, DLSU has resolved to vertical expansion. However, this has resulted in overcrowded elevators.

=== Laguna ===
The Laguna campus, also known as the Leandro V. Locsin Campus, has been an extension of De La Salle University since 2012 and is located adjacent to Laguna Technopark in Biñan, Laguna, Philippines. The 50-hectare (120-acre) campus was built on land donated by the family of the late National Artist for Architecture and De La Salle alumnus Leandro Locsin. It was originally known as De La Salle Canlubang (DLSC), a district school of De La Salle Philippines that provided science-and-technology-based primary, secondary, and tertiary education. In 2012, the administrations of DLSU and DLSC approved the integration of DLSC into DLSU, becoming the De La Salle University – Science & Technology Complex (DLSU–STC), and later renamed as the De La Salle University – Laguna Campus. By 2010, 6,000 m^{2} (65,000 sq ft) of the campus had been developed. The Laguna campus offered 18 undergraduate degree programs by 2017, as well as pre-school, primary, and secondary education at the DLSU Integrated School (DLSU IS). Its college division is called the School of Innovation and Sustainability.

In 2016, DLSU signed an agreement with Ubisoft to open a new studio in the Philippines and to offer two new undergraduate courses in game development, as well as entertainment and multimedia computing. The Laguna campus was selected as the site of the studio. The studio opened two years later in 2018, and is the first AAA game studio in the country. However, Ubisoft Philippines transferred its office to Bonifacio Global City in 2024 to address staffing challenges caused by its remote location.

In 2025, the campus was designated as a Knowledge, Innovation, Science, and Technology (KIST) Ecozone.

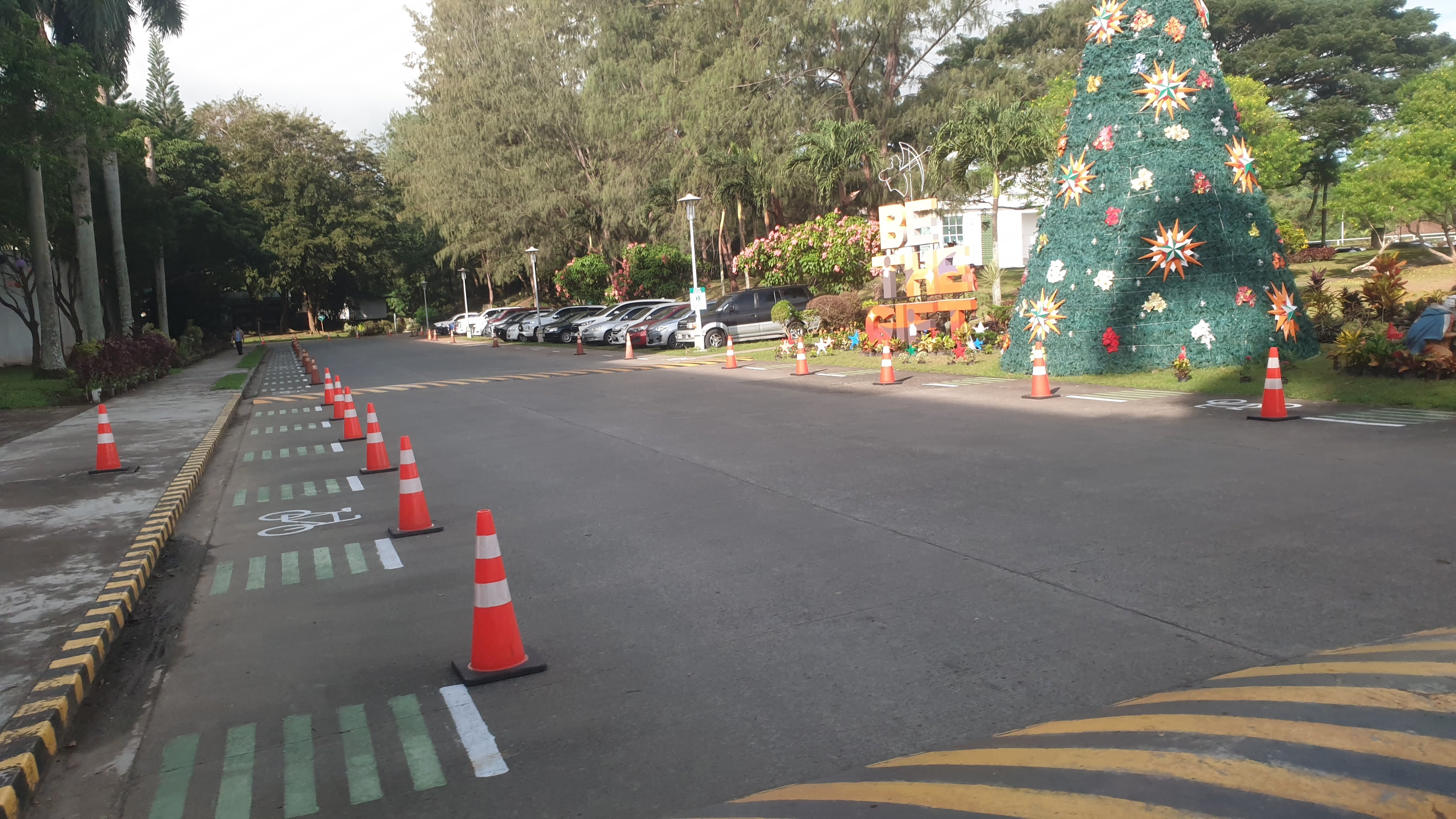
Bike lanes on Archbishop Harty Road at DLSU Laguna Campus

The Laguna campus has inner roads named after notable Lasallian brothers and saints in the university's history. The facilities in the campus include:

- Milagros R. del Rosario Building, the first building in the campus. The five-story building houses the campus's administrative offices, DLSU Integrated School's senior high school, computer and science laboratories, an auditorium, a library for senior high school and college levels, a media laboratory, a radio station booth, and three research facilities. The building was donated to the school by Ambassador Ramon V. del Rosario. Construction began in April 2002 and was completed in June 2003. It was designed by the firm L.V. Locsin and Partners.
- Learning Center 1 (LC1), home to DLSU Integrated School's pre-school, Kindergarten, and elementary (Grades 1 to 4) levels. It is also considered to be part of LC1, LC1 Annex, or more commonly Annex.
- Integrated School Complex, also known as Learning Center 2 (LC2), home to the DLSU Integrated School's Grades 5 to 10, as well as the Integrated School's library and administrative office since 2013.
- One Mission Park, a park between the Milagros R. del Rosario Building and Learning Commons 1 containing the statue of St. John Baptist de La Salle and the 100th anniversary logo of De La Salle University.
- Residence Hall, a two-story dormitory for senior high school and college students, and the first dormitory at the campus.
- Kalye Berde, an elevated park with the statue of Leandro Locsin.
- Richard L. Lee Engineering Technology Block, originally known as The Hangar, a three-story hub of the university's engineering program, inaugurated in February 2019. It houses the industry locators doing various R&D projects on campus, as well as Animo Labs and laboratories that will cater the College of Computer Studies.
- George S.K. Ty Advanced Instrumentation Building, originally known as the Clean Building, a four-story building completed in 2018 and inaugurated in 2019. It currently houses classrooms for the college level, as well as high-precision equipment for experiments and laboratory works. It is also home to research facilities, including the Central Instrumentation Facility (NMR Lab), Integrated Electron Microscopy Center, Biological Control Research Unit, and Imaging and Cell Culture Facility.
- Teaching Laboratory Building, also known as the Clean Building Extension, a five-story building situated next to George S.K. Ty Advanced Instrumentation Building. The building was completed in 2023.
- John L. Gokongwei Jr. Innovation Center, a three-story building launched in January 2019 that hosted the Philippine hub of Ubisoft from 2018 to 2024.
- Santuario de La Salle, the world's first Roman Catholic shrine dedicated to St. John Baptist de La Salle. Originally named as Signum Fidei Chapel and Shrine of St. John Baptist de La Salle, its groundbreaking was held on January 26, 2019, on the campus's former open parking, and it was opened on November 21, 2022. A carillon tower is located southeast of the shrine.
- Enrique K. Razon Jr. Hall, a multidisciplinary center that houses the Enrique K. Razon Jr. Logistics Institute and learning spaces, including the "first bi-level digital learning commons". Inaugurated on December 6, 2024, it is named after La Salle Green Hills alumnus Enrique K. Razon.
- University Hall, an academic building adjoining the Enrique K. Razon Hall, opened in 2025.
- Sports facilities, such as:
  - The campus's Football Field and Track Oval, an artificial football pitch and track and field oval. The football field, surrounded by an IAAF-standard track, measures 100 by 64 meters (328 by 210 ft) wide and is the second artificial pitch in Laguna after the Biñan Football Stadium.
  - St. Matthew Gymnasium, a fully air-conditioned indoor sports facility that features open courts with a 504-seating capacity for university-wide activities and events, donated by DLSU alumnus Danilo Dimayuga. It was opened on September 21, 2022, coinciding with the feast day of its namesake, St. Matthew the Apostle.
  - DLSU Covered Court, the original indoor court of the campus.
  - IS Football Field, a soccer field near DLSU Integrated School buildings such as LC1 and LC2.
  - A semi-Olympic swimming pool, a beach volleyball court, and a baseball field near LC1 and LC2.
- Evelyn D. Ang Hall, a building that is home to the Evelyn D. Ang Institute of Biomedical Engineering and Health Technologies (EDA-IBEHT). Groundbreaking was held on November 24, 2023 and the building was topped off on January 24, 2025.

Courtyard Hall, a student dormitory managed by Arthaland Corporation on its property next to the DLSU Laguna Campus, is also considered part of the campus.

The campus will also open the following facility as part of its ongoing development:

- University Pad, a condominium, dormitory, and hotel developed by Summitleaf, Inc. Groundbreaking was held on December 6, 2024, and the facility is expected to be finished after 24 months.

=== Rufino (Bonifacio Global City) ===
The Rufino Campus is an extension of De La Salle University in Bonifacio Global City, Taguig, that serves as the College of Law building. Donated by the Rufino family, the campus consists of a seven-story green building that houses 17 classrooms, an auditorium, an arbitration room, and a moot court.

In September 2013, the Bases Conversion and Development Authority (BCDA) awarded to DLSU the lease and development of a 1,395-square-meter (15,020 sq ft) institutional building on a slightly larger lot in Bonifacio Global City. DLSU signed a contract with the BCDA in October 2013. It was inaugurated on February 18, 2017.

=== Makati (RCBC) ===
The Makati Extension Campus (MEC) is an extension campus of DLSU at the 5th floor of the Alfonso Yuchengco-owned RCBC Plaza in Makati City, Philippines. The campus primarily serves the university's graduate business students.

=== Lian ===
The Lian campus, known as the De La Salle University – Br. Alfred Shields Ocean Research (SHORE) Center Marine Station (formerly the DLSU Marine Biological Station) is a research facility and an extension of DLSU on a 1-hectare (2.5-acre) parcel of land in Sitio Matuod, Barangay Binubusan, Lian, Batangas. It is an academic facility of the College of Science for further class field activities, research and extension activities and as a base for teaching, research, and extension activities in coastal areas. The SHORE Center was established in May 2013 upon approval by Br. Ricardo Laguda, FSC, then president and chancellor of DLSU, to which the existing Marine Station would be attached. The SHORE Center is headquartered at Henry Sy Sr. Hall of the Manila campus.

== Organization ==
Directors
Name	Tenure of office
Blimond Pierre Eilenbecker	1911–1912
Goslin Camille Thomas	1912–1915
Acisclus Michael Naughter	1915–1919
Albinus Peter Graves	1919–1921
Presidents
Name	Tenure of office
Albinus Peter Graves	1921–1923
Acisclus Michael Naughter	1923–1927
Celba John Lynam	1927–1930
Dorothy Joseph Brophy	1930–1933
Marcian James Cullen	1933–1936
Flannan Paul Gallagher	1936
Egbert Xavier Kelly	1937–1945
Lucian Athanasius Reinhart	1945–1950
Antony Ferdinand Kilbourn	1946 (acting)
Andelino Manuel Castillo	1950 (acting)
Hyacinth Gabriel Connon	1950–1959
Denis of Mary Ruhland	1959–1961
Crescentius Richard Duerr	1961–1966
Hyacinth Gabriel Connon	1966–1978
Andrew Gonzalez	1978–1991
Rafael Donato	1991–1994
Andrew Gonzalez	1994–1998
Rolando Ramos Dizon	1998–2003
Carmelita Quebengco	2003–2004
Armin Luistro	2004–2010
Narciso S. Erguiza Jr.	2010–2012
Ricardo Laguda	2012–2015
Raymundo B. Suplido	2015–2021
Bernard S. Oca	2021–present
Notes	Names in italics were acting presidents.
Reference

=== Administration ===
As a non-stock incorporated entity, DLSU is governed by an independent board of trustees. The DLSU Board of Trustees, currently chaired by Dr. Fortunato T. de la Peña, selects the DLSU president. As resolved by the board of trustees in June 2010, the president of De La Salle University must be a Lasallian Brother and be a holder of a PhD. Filipino citizenship is not a must but preferred. Prior to the university's move to its present location in 1921, the president was referred to as the director. The president and the Provost are assisted by four vice chancellors. Prior to the reorganization of DLSU in 2007, the chancellor was referred to as the executive vice president. The president may concurrently be the chancellor of the university, as with former president and chancellor Br. Armin Luistro, FSC.

Since its establishment in 1911, De La Salle University has had 24 presidents (10 Filipinos, six Americans, six Irishmen, and two Frenchmen); Br. Bernard S. Oca, FSC is serving as the current president. His term started on August 1, 2021. All of them, except Carmelita Quebengco, were male. Two of them had been appointed as secretaries of the Philippine Department of Education, including Br. Andrew Gonzalez, FSC (1998–2001) and Br. Armin Luistro, FSC (2010–2016). Meanwhile, Br. Rolando Ramos Dizon, FSC, also a former DLSU, University of St. La Salle and La Salle Green Hills president, had served as the chairman of Philippine Commission on Higher Education from 2003 to 2004. Brother Armin Luistro, FSC became the first Superior-General of the De La Salle Brothers worldwide on May 18, 2022.

=== Affiliations ===
De La Salle University is the oldest member of De La Salle Philippines, a network of 16 Lasallian institutions established in 2006. DLSP is the successor of the De La Salle University System, a similar organization. De La Salle Philippines is a member of an international, worldwide network of Lasallian educational institutions. Presently, the Lasallian order consists of over 3,000 Christian Brothers, who together with 90,000 teachers and Lay associates help run and manage over 1,100 educational institutions established globally in 80 countries with over a million students worldwide.

De La Salle University is also a member of several notable international university associations such as the ASEAN University Network, Association of Christian Universities and Colleges in Asia, Association of Southeast and East Asian Catholic Colleges and Universities, Association of Southeast Asian Institutions of Higher Learning, International Association of Lasallian Universities, International Association of Universities, International Federation of Catholic Universities, United Board for Christian Higher Education in Asia and University Cooperation for Internationalisation. The university is also a member of local organizations, including the Philippine Association for Technological Education and the South Manila Inter-Institutional Consortium.

== Academics ==
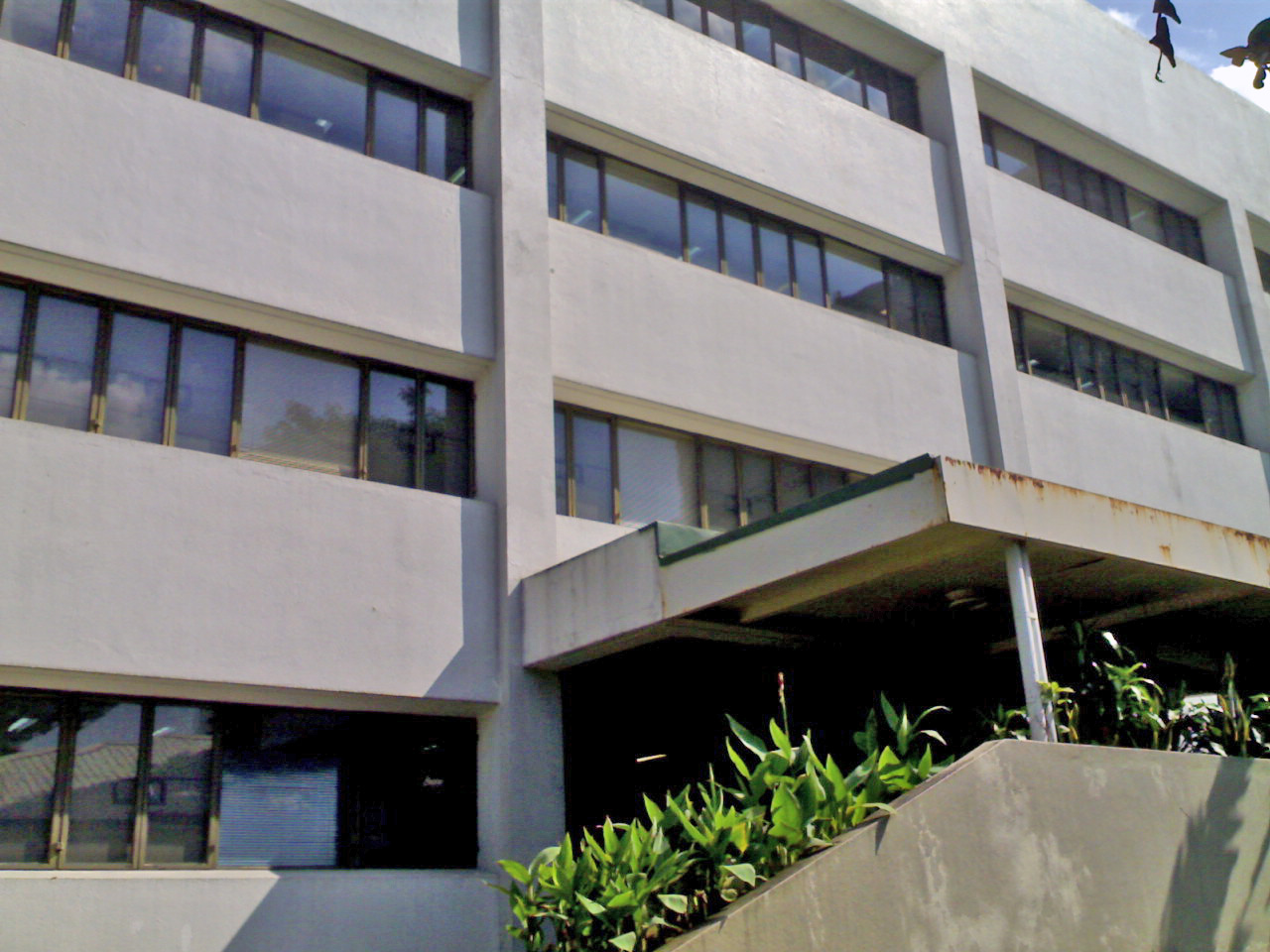
The facade of the Faculty Center (formerly the DLSU Library) built in 1985

De La Salle University offers over a hundred undergraduate and graduate degree programs through its seven colleges and one school. It also offers a degree in mechatronics and robotics, one of the first to offer such in the Philippines. As of 2022, DLSU operates 15 research centers and institutes.

DLSU received 23,495 undergraduate freshman applications in 2010, and 3,428 of them were admitted. In the same year, it had 11,413 undergraduate and 3,366 graduate students, making a total of 14,779, with 704 of these being non-Filipino. Fifty-three percent of the undergraduate students were male while 59 of the graduate students were female. Eighty-five percent of its students come from Metro Manila while almost all reside near the university. In 2011, it had an average of 990 faculty members for the academic year. Sixty-nine percent of them held doctorate degrees, while 28 had master's degrees. In Academic Year 2021–22, the university had 1,500 faculty members. It also received 19,488 undergraduate freshman applications and 7,397 were enrolled. DLSU also had 18,821 undergraduate and 4,289 graduate students for a total student population of 23,110.

The College of Liberal Arts and the College of Business, both established in 1918 and 1920 respectively, are the oldest degree-granting units of the university. The College of Liberal Arts was originally established as the College of Arts and Sciences. In 1982, the departments of Biology, Chemistry, Mathematics, and Physics separated from the Liberal Arts department to formally establish the College of Science as a distinct unit in the university. The College of Business was originally known as the College of Commerce, and later reorganized as the College of Business and Economics until 2010. In 2011, the College of Business was inaugurated as the present-day Ramon V. del Rosario College of Business.

The Br. Andrew Gonzalez College of Education dates back to 1936 when De La Salle College was authorized to confer the degree of Master of Science in education. It was in 1959 when the college started to offer undergraduate degrees in education. The Gokongwei College of Engineering was established in 1947 after World War II, and the College of Computer Studies was created in 1981, the same year the university shifted to a trimestral academic calendar.

The College of Law and the School of Economics, both established in 2010, are the newest units of the university. The College of Law was established by Founding Dean Chel Diokno. It offers a Juris Doctor degree program with focus on environmental and human rights law. On February 26, 2022, it was renamed as the Tañada-Diokno College of Law. The School of Economics is the product of the reorganization of the now-defunct College of Business and Economics to create two separate entities in the university. The School of Economics formally separated from the College of Business in 2010.

=== Grading system ===
Academic performance is rated from 4.0 (excellent) to 0.0 (fail). Grades 4.0 to 1.0 are separated by increments of 0.5, while 0.0 is immediately after 1.0. Students who attain a grade point average of 3.8, 3.6, 3.4 and 3.2 are awarded upon graduation summa cum laude, magna cum laude, cum laude and honorable mention, respectively. Graduation occurs every February, June and October.

=== Tuition and financial aid ===
De La Salle's tuition fee is one of the highest in the Philippines in terms of annual payment and may vary in different colleges within the university. As of Term 2, 2021, the price-per-unit for 6 colleges (RVR-COB, CLA, GCOE, SOE, COS, CCS) is ₱3,604.00 with the only exception being the Br. Andrew Gonzalez College of Education with ₱3,021.00. Total cost of studies per year in DLSU may range from, on average, ₱205,000 to ₱225,000.

DLSU offers multiple scholarship and financial aid programs in both the undergraduate and graduate levels. High school valedictorians and salutatorians of all De La Salle Philippines schools are automatically exempted from paying fees under the Br. Andrew Gonzalez Academic Scholarship program. Also, dependents of military personnel who died or became incapacitated during duty enjoy similar benefits through PD 577. Meanwhile, children of faculty and staff, university athletes and performing artists, and senior editors of DLSU student publications are provided tuition fee discounts. Further financial assistance may be provided to students with annual family incomes less than ₱500,000 (US$11,600). Aside from these, the Top 100 of the De La Salle College Admission Test (DCAT) are given full scholarship under the Archer Achiever Scholarship program.

=== Reputation and rankings ===
University rankings

Global – Overall
- QS World: 751–760 (2027)
- THE World: 1801–2000 (2027)

Regional – Overall
- QS Asia: 204 (2027)
- THE Asia: 601–800 (2026)

National – Overall
- QS National: 3 (2026)
- THE National: 3 (2026)

As of 2026, Quacquarelli Symonds (QS) ranks DLSU in the 751–760 bracket of its World University Rankings and 204th on its Asian University Rankings. DLSU has appeared on the QS rankings since 2005. Times Higher Education (THE) included De La Salle University in its 2019 edition of Times Higher Education World University Rankings where DLSU was placed in the 801–1000 bracket, which also marked the university's first appearance in the rankings. It joined the University of the Philippines as the only two universities in the Philippines to enter the list, and was the only private university from the Philippines to be included at the time. De La Salle University also made its debut appearance on the Times Higher Education Asia University Rankings in 2019, where it was placed in the 251–300 bracket. As of 2026, DLSU is placed in the 1801–2000 and 601–800 brackets, respectively.

As of 2026, De La Salle University is ranked second in the Philippines by the Webometrics Ranking of World Universities, after University of the Philippines Diliman and ahead of Ateneo de Manila University and University of Santo Tomas. The university also ranks fourth in the list of top universities in the Philippines by the SCImago Institutions Rankings (SIR), after University of the Philippines Diliman, University of the Philippines Manila and University of Santo Tomas, and ahead of University of the Philippines Los Baños and Ateneo de Manila University. DLSU is also ranked second by EduRank in its list of 100 best universities in the Philippines, after University of the Philippines Diliman, and ahead of Ateneo de Manila University and University of Santo Tomas. The university has yet to appear in any edition of the Academic Ranking of World Universities (ARWU).

In 2010, De La Salle University was identified by the Commission on Higher Education (CHED) as a Center of Excellence in seven disciplines (namely biology, chemistry, Filipino, information technology, literature, mathematics, physics), teacher education, and a Center of Development in the field of political science and engineering (namely chemical engineering, civil engineering, industrial engineering, electronics and communications engineering, computer engineering and mechanical engineering).

It is the first of the only two institutions (the other being Ateneo de Manila University) granted the highest-level accreditation (Level IV) by the Philippine Accrediting Association of Schools, Colleges and Universities (PAASCU).

=== Libraries and collections ===
The 14-story Henry Sy Sr. Hall, houses the Learning Commons since 2012

The college library was established in 1956 upon the merger of the high school and college libraries. It was located on the first two floors of St. Joseph Hall with a seating capacity of 100 persons and a collection of almost 10,000 books. Its collection includes 21,218 titles and 33,741 volumes on language and literature as of 2008, 3,751 titles and 4,898 volumes on fine arts and music as of 2006, and 17,999 titles and 26,526 volumes on philosophy and religion as of 2005. A 2001 assessment places its number of periodicals at 14,362 titles. The De La Salle University Library, now called the Learning Commons, is presently housed in the 14-story Henry Sy Sr. Hall. The Learning Commons occupies the 5th to the 13th floors. The Henry Sy Sr. Hall has almost four hectares of floor space. Aside from the Learning Commons, DLSU also has satellite libraries such as the Br. Benedict Learning Resource Center, located on the 18th floor of Br. Andrew Gonzalez Hall; the Business Library at Makati Campus; the Law Library at Rufino Campus; and three libraries for pre-school, Integrated School, and college levels, respectively, at Laguna Campus.

The University Archives grew from its early beginnings in 1973 as the College Archives to a major department/unit in 1989, occupying the fourth floor of the DLSU Library. It holds materials of historical significance to the university (many of which were lost during the Second World War), and acts as its "official memory". The Archives now holds not only the theses collection and the university records, but also the special collections (consisting of books as well as non-book materials, manuscripts and personal papers), faculty publications, De La Salle publications, LaSalliana collection, and museum artifacts among others. Its museum collection includes over 600 ceramic artifacts from Southeast Asia dating back as early as 200 BC, almost 400 specimens of rare Philippine banknotes and coins, and over 200 artworks. In addition, it has 298 volumes of film scripts, 766 audio tapes, 66 videotapes, 1,205 volumes on health and nutrition, and 1,050 books and journals on neurology and related disciplines, among others. Several of these collections are donations previously owned by various notable Lasallites, including lawyer and Senator José W. Diokno, Don Francisco Ortigas Jr., José Javier Reyes, and Senator Lorenzo Tañada.

The Museum is the university's collection of Philippine modern art donated by the heirs of Doreen Fernandez, a food critic. The collection comprises more than 400 works by several artists, including ten National Artists of the Philippines (namely Fernando Amorsolo, Benedicto Cabrera, Botong Francisco, José T. Joya, Ang Kiukok, Cesar Legaspi, Arturo R. Luz, Vicente Manansala, Jeremias Elizalde Navarro and Hernando R. Ocampo).

== Research ==
The De La Salle University Science Foundation serves as DLSU's repository of research funding, providing research grants to faculty and scholarship grants to students. Registered in April 1998, its total assets were worth over ₱8.5 billion (US$197 million) in 2008. 120 (20 percent) of DLSU faculty had been involved in 80 research projects between March 2008 and February 2009. 39 (12 percent) of its faculty had their research published in ISI-listed journals in 2008.

Since 2000, DLSU has been the Commission on Higher Education Zonal Research Center for the 59 colleges and universities located in Las Piñas, Makati, Manila, Muntinlupa, Parañaque, Pasay, Pasig, Pateros, Taguig and San Juan. Its functions include evaluation of research proposals for recommendation for CHED funding and monitoring of CHED-funded researches, among others.

The College of Computer Studies Center for Empathic Human-Computer Interactions specializes in affective computing, a study that seeks to create machines capable of reacting to human emotions. The center is funded by the Philippine Department of Science and Technology. Emotion recognition (including laughter recognition), behavior prediction and the influence of music to emotion are among the center's research, many of which are in collaboration with Osaka University. The center, also in collaboration with Osaka, is the first one that constructed an empathic computing space in the Philippines.

The Center for Micro-Hydro Technology for Rural Electrification of the College of Engineering, established in 2002 through Japan International Cooperation Agency funds, is engaged in designing micro hydro generators. The center, in coordination with the Philippine Department of Energy, has been involved in the electrification of remote areas using micro hydro installations.

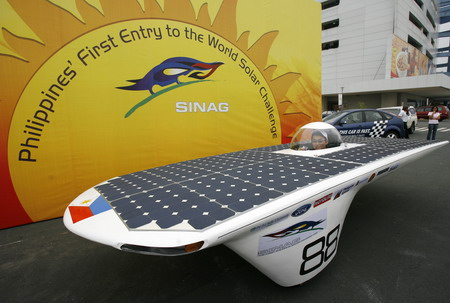
SINAG, the first Philippine solar car

Both of the only two solar cars, SINAG (Tagalog for light beam) and SIKAT (brilliance), of the Philippines were made by DLSU engineering faculty and students. SINAG participated in the 2007 World Solar Challenge, and finished 12th among 40 entries. SIKAT (which has more advanced solar cells, a more aerodynamic body, and 100 kg less weight) will participate in the 2011 competition. The project is funded by several private companies, including Ford Philippines, Pilipinas Shell, Philippine Airlines and San Miguel Corporation.

The College of Engineering is among the 18 "National Research Institutions" of the Asian Regional Research Programme on Environmental Technology, a project funded by the Swedish International Development Cooperation Agency and coordinated by the Asian Institute of Technology that seeks to assess environmental degradation in Asia. The college has also conducted research on biodiesel from the pili nut and winged bean, and sustainable technology.

In 2020, the university's I-Nano facility initiated a project on developing a Thermal Mechanical Garment (outer layer of a space suit) made from Abaca fiber. This is officially funded by the DOST and to be collaborated alongside the Technological University of the Philippines, FEATI University, Philippine Nuclear Research Institute, and the Philippine Textile Research Institute. In the same year, the university also won £200,000 (₱13.2 million) from the Newton Fund of the UK government for its research on the conversion of wastewater into nutrient-rich fertilizer for farming improvement.

Based on Scopus-indexed papers, De La Salle University was named the country's most productive research university in March 2020. In 2019, DLSU published over 600 Scopus-indexed publications, the most by any Philippine institution in a single calendar year. DLSU's publications account for almost 15% of the nation's research output. DLSU had 4,113 indexed publications in the database by June 2020, which was the second-highest number among Philippine higher education institutions (HEIs). According to Scopus's most recent citation database, DLSU's 2019 statistics were 729, keeping it as the country's top research institution.

In September 2024, a student from the university won the 2024 James Dyson Award in the Philippines for his underground monitoring system that provides real-time video feeds of the Earth's subsurface. In September 2025, three of the university's professors were included in Research.com's list of World's Best Scientists 2025 in their respective fields.

== Student life ==
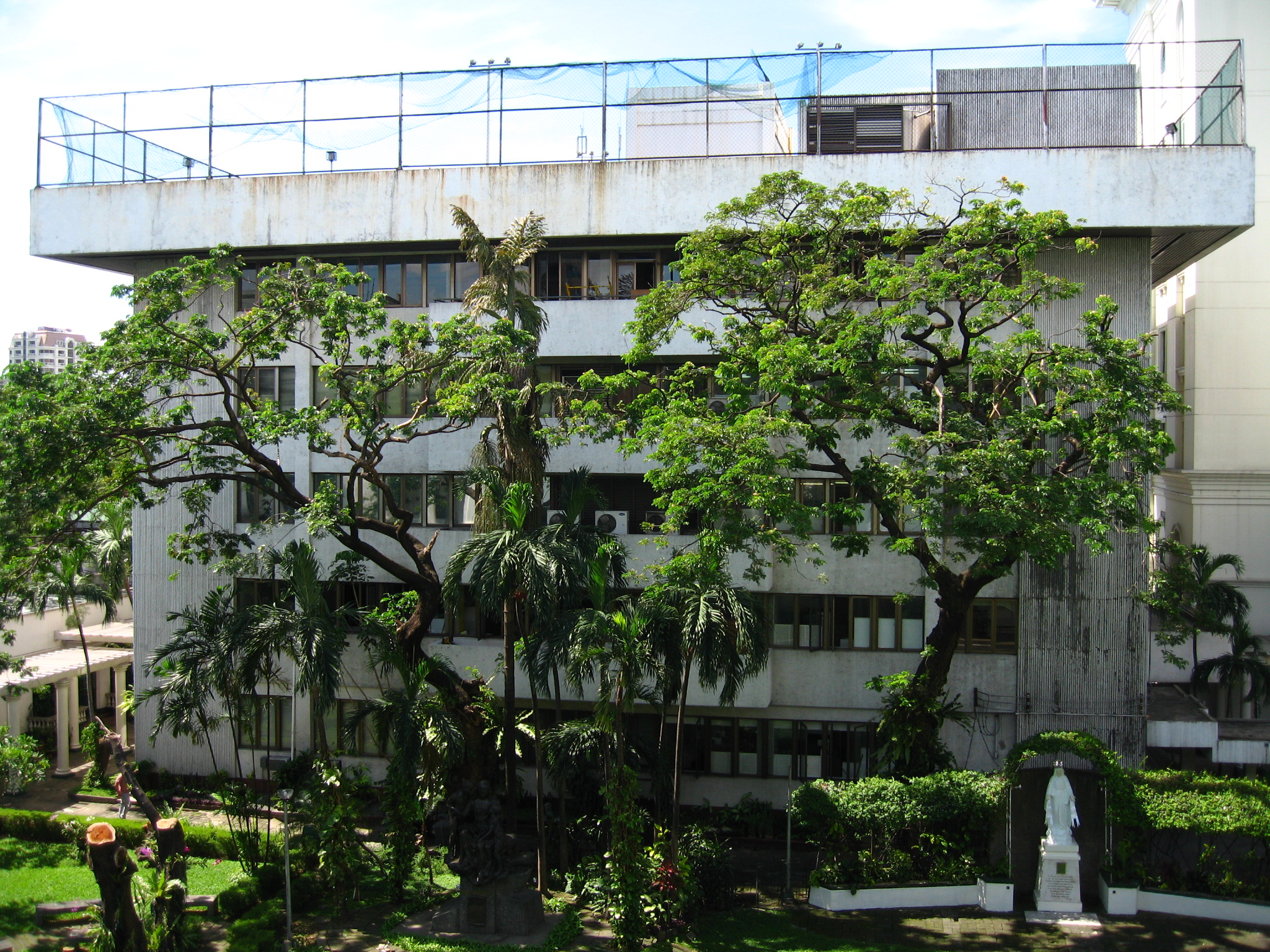
Br. Connon Hall, location of the Office of the Dean of Student Affairs

As of 2010, the Council of Student Organizations, a union of DLSU-accredited student organizations, had 39 members. Founded in 1974, the council oversees implementation of university-wide activities, such as annual freshmen welcoming.

The LaSallian (first published in 1960) and Ang Pahayagang Plaridel (Tagalog for The Plaridel Newspaper; first published in 1984) are the official student newspapers of the university. The two, written in English and Filipino respectively, are among the four periodicals managed by the Student Media Office. Other student media groups managed by the Student Media Office include the Malate Literary Folio, Green & White, Green Giant FM, and Archers Network.

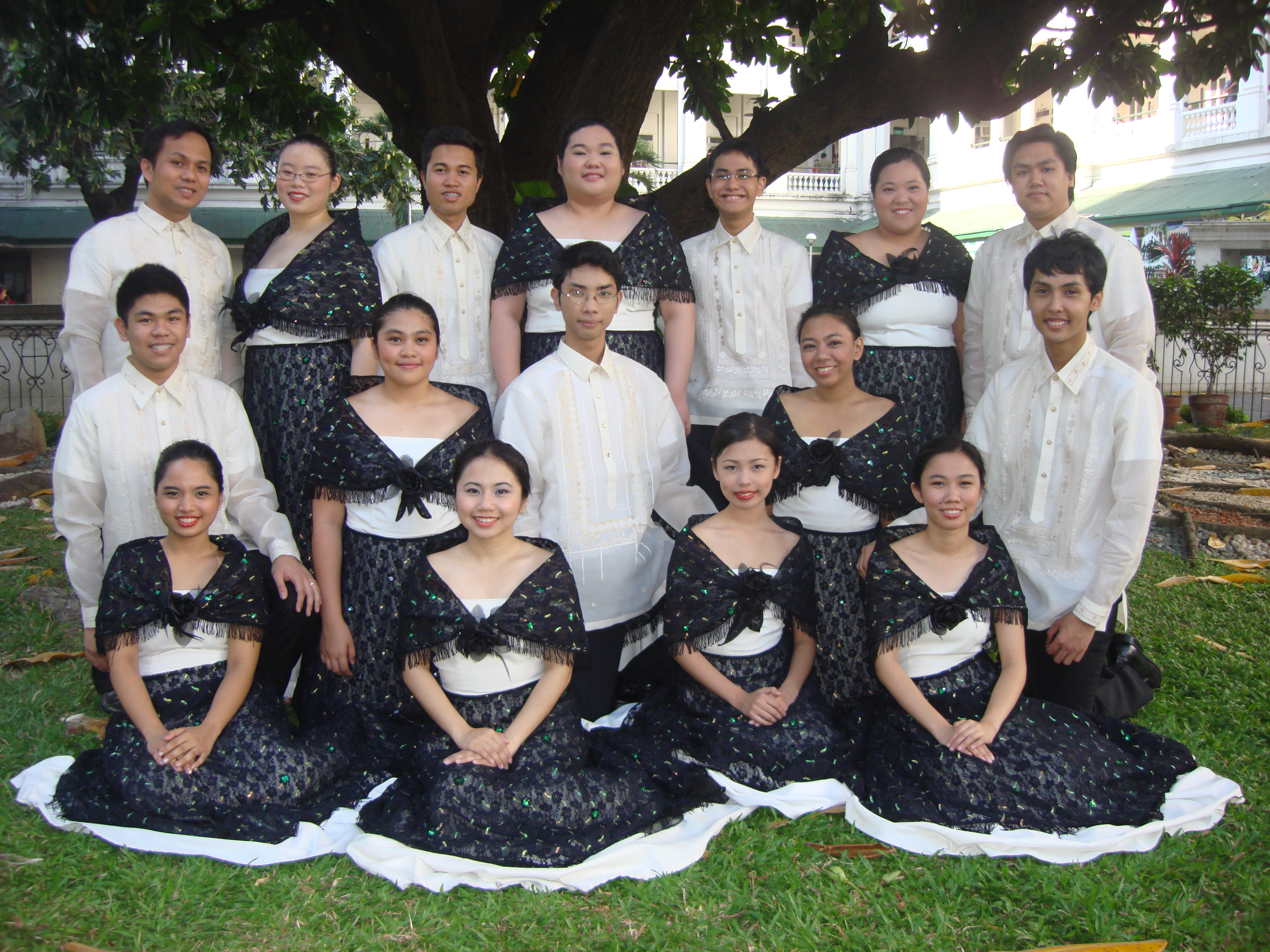
The De La Salle University Chorale in 2010

=== Performing arts ===
The De La Salle University Chorale is "the premiere chorale group in the university." Since its establishment in 1987, it has won several awards from different international choir competitions, including the Llangollen International Musical Eisteddfod in 1992 and 2010 for the chamber and folk music, and the grand prize in the Tampere Vocal Music Festival in 1995, among others.

The La Salle Dance Company – Street is the first champion of the UAAP Street Dance Competition, an annual event organized by the University Athletic Association of the Philippines since it was first introduced in the second semester of UAAP Season 73 in 2011. They have won the most number of titles in the seniors' division of the UAAP Street Dance Competition with four championships. They also represent the country as frequent finalists in the World Hip Hop Dance Championships. Other groups in the company specialize in contemporary and folk.

Established around 1966, the Harlequin Theatre Guild is the official theater organization of DLSU. It has performed plays written by Palanca Awards laureates, including Unang Ulan ng Mayo (Tagalog for First Rainfall of May) by John Iremil Teodoro, which was staged for the fourth time in December 2011 in line with the LGBT month of Metro Manila and Rizal is My President: 40 Leadership Tips from Jose Rizal by Joshua So based on the book written by Napoleon G. Almonte and staged during the May 2009 presidential elections. Other notable organizations include the De La Salle Innersoul, Green Media Group, and Lasallian Youth Orchestra.

=== Athletics ===
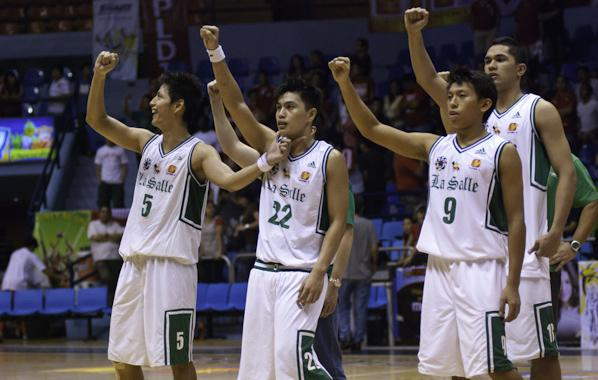
The De La Salle Green Archers in 2010

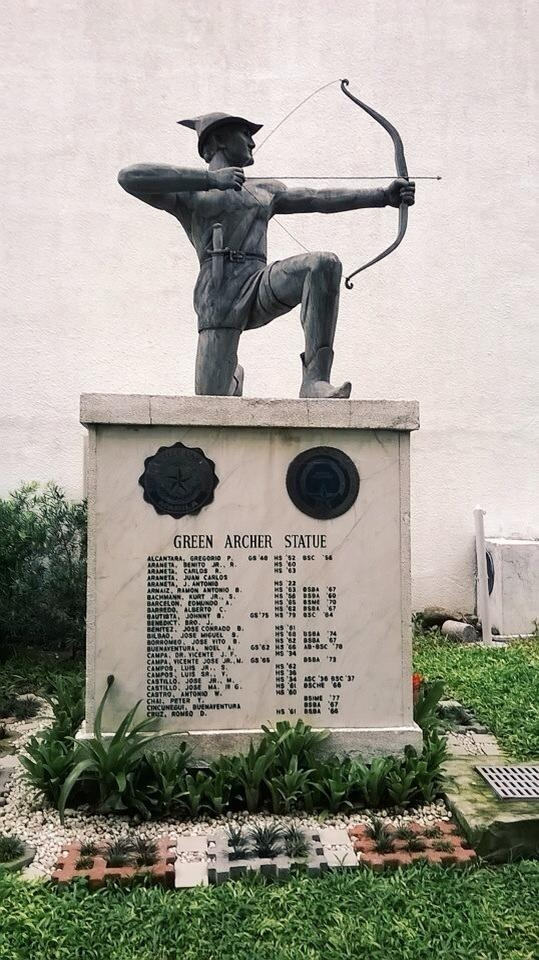
The Green Archer statue

La Salle has several varsity teams and sport clubs participating in different sports competitions, most notably basketball, volleyball, football and cheerleading. In 1924, De La Salle College (DLSC) became a pre-war founding member of the National Collegiate Athletic Association (NCAA), in which it won five General Championships (1972–73, 1974–75, 1976–77, 1977–78, and 1980–81). La Salle announced its decision to leave the NCAA in a press conference in September 1980, effective after the then ongoing 1980–81 NCAA Season due to a violent basketball game against their archrivals at the time, the Letran Knights. Irish-American Br. Celba John Lynam FSC organized the first La Salle sports teams and the first La Salle & LSC Yell Command Spirit Team. In 1924, he established the pre-war NCAA as the first and oldest collegiate athletic association in the Philippines composed of De La Salle College, San Beda College, University of the Philippines, University of Santo Tomas, Institute of Accounts (now Far Eastern University), National University, Ateneo de Manila, and University of Manila. In 1986, De La Salle University was admitted into the University Athletic Association of the Philippines (UAAP), an intercollegiate sporting association formed in 1938. Ever since joining the UAAP in 1986, DLSU has won three UAAP General Championships – Season 75 (2012–13), Season 76 (2013–14), and Season 78 (2015–16), giving the university a combined eight General Championship titles in the seniors' division in the NCAA and UAAP. Notable Lasallian athletes and alumni are inducted into the De La Salle Alumni Association (DLSAA) Sports Hall of Fame.

=== Alma Mater Hymn ===
In 1961, Br. Stephen Malachy FSC took out a small harmonica during a class and shared a song that he and Br. Bonaventure Richard FSC had recently composed to his students. The melody originated in San Joaquin Memorial High School (a Christian Brother school), in Fresno, California, where Br. Malachy was assigned as a lyricist in the 1950s. The words were modified, but the tune is the same. The song was first sung during a graduation in 1964. It was later adopted by the NCAA basketball team and cheerleaders in 1965 when La Salle lost to Mapua Tech, but the Lasallites stayed to sing the song at the end of the game. The song eventually became the alma mater theme of De La Salle College and other Lasallian institutions in the Philippines. The De La Salle Alma Mater Hymn has, since the 1960s, been sung traditionally by all Lasallians in every Lasallian sports, alumni, and school event in all 16 La Salle schools in the Philippines with the gesture of continuously raising a clenched fist into the air. De La Salle was the first school in any Philippine collegiate league to sing its Alma Mater Hymn after the end of each La Salle match in the NCAA – a practice now done by all schools in the NCAA and the UAAP.

=== Animo La Salle ===
Animo is the traditional Lasallian word for "Spirit to Fight" and it is also known as the "La Salle Spirit". Animo La Salle, the school battle cry, was derived from the Lasallian spirit of "Faith & Zeal" of St. John Baptist de La Salle and his Christian Brothers. The Lasallian spirit of "Faith" is symbolized by a radiant Signum Fidei Christmas Nativity Star of Bethlehem. The Lasallian spirit of "Zeal" on the other hand, is symbolized by three broken chevrons that represent the three broken leg bones suffered by Warrior Chieftain Johan Salla of Atphonus the Chaste, king of Oviedo Spain, who was the great-grandfather of Saint La Salle who fought several battles to defend Christian Spain from invading Eastern Moorish armies. The ancient broken chevrons can be seen on the 1000-year-old royal coat of arms of the De La Salle family. The coat of arms contains the Latin motto Indivisa Manent which translates to being "Permanently Indivisible". This ancient motto of the De La Salle family was carried over and presently translated into the modern tagline of De La Salle Philippines as "One La Salle".

== See also ==
- Ateneo de Manila University – De La Salle University's major college rival
  - Ateneo–La Salle rivalry
- De La Salle Brothers
- De La Salle Brothers Philippine District
- De La Salle Philippines
- John Baptist de La Salle
- Lasallian educational institutions
- List of colleges and universities in Metro Manila
