= Rafael Donato =

Rafael Donato may refer to:

- Rafael Donato (academic) (1938–2006), Filipino academic, linguist, and university president
- Rafael Donato (footballer) (born 1989), Brazilian footballer
