= De La Salle University College of Liberal Arts =

Coordinates: 14.56626°N 120.99375°E

College of Liberal Arts
- Dalubhasaan ng mga Malalayang Sining
- Type: Private
- Established: 1918; 1982
- Dean: Dr. Ador R. Torneo
- Associate Dean: Dr. Darren E. Dumaop
- Academic staff: 208
- Location: Malate, Manila, Philippines
- Website: www.dlsu.edu.ph/cla/

The College of Liberal Arts (CLA) of De La Salle University, formerly known as the College of Arts and Sciences was founded in 1918. In 1982, the College of Arts and Sciences was split into two colleges, the College of Liberal Arts, and the College of Science. The CLA provides Lasallians with a liberal education enough to develop the student in humanities and the social sciences. The college is now the most populous in the university, following the split of the College of Business and Economics into the College of Business and the School of Economics in 2010. The CLA Administration is located on the Ground Floor of the Faculty Center. The Departments of Literature and English are both recognized by the Commission on Higher Education as Centers of Excellence.

== Academic departments of the CLA ==
- Communication
- Filipino
- History
- International Studies
- Literature
- Philosophy
- Political Science and Development Studies
- Psychology
- Sociology and Behavioral Sciences
- Theology and Religious Education

== Degree offerings ==
=== Undergraduate Degree Programs ===
- AB in Behavioral Sciences major in Organizational and Social Systems Development
- AB in Communication Arts
- AB in Development Studies
- AB in History
- AB in International Studies major in American Studies
- AB in International Studies major in Chinese Studies
- AB in International Studies major in European Studies
- AB in International Studies major in Japanese Studies
- AB in Literature
- AB in Organizational Communication
- AB in Philippine Studies major in Filipino in Mass Media
- AB in Philosophy
- AB in Political Science
- AB in Psychology
- AB in Sports Studies
- BS in Psychology
- Bachelor of Arts and BS in commerce (AB-BSC or LIA-COM Program), major from any of the AB major fields, combined with any of the following Commerce degrees:
  - BS in Accountancy
  - BS in Advertising Management
  - BS in Applied Corporate Management
  - BS in Business Management
  - BS in Entrepreneurship
  - BS in Legal Management
  - BS in Management of Financial Institutions
  - BS in Marketing Management

=== Graduate Degree Programs ===
- Doctor of Arts in Language and Literature major in English
- Doctor of Arts in Language and Literature major in Filipino
- Doctor of Arts in Language and Literature major in Literature
- Doctor of Philosophy in Applied Theology
- Doctor of Philosophy in Development Studies
- Doctor of Philosophy in Filipino majors in Language and Literature
- Doctor of Philosophy in Literature
- Doctor of Philosophy in Philosophy
- Master of Arts in Applied Behavioral Sciences
- Master of Arts in Applied Theology (Thesis/Non-Thesis Program)
- Master of Arts in Communication major in Applied Media Studies
- Master of Arts in Development Policy
- Master of Arts in Education major in Religious and Values Education
- Master of Arts in history (Thesis/Non-Thesis Program)
- Master of Arts in International Studies major in European Studies
- Master of Arts in Language and Literature major in Filipino
- Master of Arts in Language and Literature major in Literature
- Master of Arts in Philippine Studies
- Master of Arts in Political Science
- Master of Arts in Religious Education
- Master of Arts in Religious Formation
- Master of Arts major in Japanese Studies
- Master of Education major in Religious Values Education with Specialization in Formative Counseling
- Master of Education major in Religious and Values Education
- Master of Fine Arts major in Creative Writing
- Master of Health in Social Science
- Master of History/Political Science
- Master of Science in Psychology major in Applied Social and Cultural Psychology
- Master of Science in Psychology major in Clinical Psychology
- Master of Science in Psychology major in Human Development Psychology
- Master of Science in Psychology major in Industrial Psychology
- Master of Science in Psychology major in Organizational Psychology
- Master of Science in Psychology major in Psychological Measurement
- Master of Science in Psychology major in Social Cultural Psychology
- Master of Philosophy

=== Certificate and Diploma Programs ===
- Certificate in Teaching Religion
- Diploma in Applied Theology

== Notable alumni ==
- Ryan Agoncillo - host, Philippine Idol; main cast in Krystala, Ysabella, Kasal, Kasali, Kasalo, and played a cameo role in Ouija
- Shaira Luna - Mensa-certified genius; former TV host & Dep-Ed Youth Representative; professional freelance photographer
- Edu Manzano - chairman, Optical Media Board; Host, Game Ka Na Ba and The Weakest Link; film and television actor; radio commentator at DZMM
- Kitchie Nadal - band vocalist; commercial model
- Vitaliano N. Nañagas III - former chairman, Development Bank of the Philippines; former president, Social Security System of the Philippines
- Ambeth Ocampo - Director, National Historical Institute, Republic of the Philippines
- Rufus Rodriguez - Member, House of Representatives of the Philippines; former Commissioner of the Bureau of Immigration and Deportation; former Dean, San Sebastian College - Recoletos College of Law; former lead counsel of former President Joseph Estrada, Senator Loren Legarda, and 2004 Presidential candidate Fernando Poe Jr.
- Gary Valenciano - concert performer, composer, and producer
