= Gokongwei College of Engineering =

Coordinates: 14.5663°N 120.9932°E

- Dalubhasaan ng Inhenyeriya ng Gokongwei
- Type: Private
- Established: 1947
- Dean: Dr. Kathleen Aviso
- Associate Dean: Engr. Maria Antonette Roque
- Academic staff: 114
- Location: Malate, Manila, Philippines
- Website: www.dlsu.edu.ph/coe/

The Gokongwei College of Engineering of De La Salle University is one of eight colleges that comprise the University. It was established in 1947 with the aim of providing young men who are knowledgeable in science and technology to help rehabilitate the Philippines, which was then devastated in the aftermath of World War II.

At present the College aims to prepare young men and women to help in the industrialization and improvement of the economy of the Philippines. The College currently offers six Bachelor of Science (BS) degree programs: Chemical Engineering, Civil Engineering, Electronics and Communications Engineering, Industrial Engineering, Manufacturing Engineering and Management, and Mechanical Engineering, as well as Doctor of Philosophy programs in Chemical Engineering, Electronics and Communications Engineering, Industrial Engineering, and Mechanical Engineering. It also offers Master of Science programs for its undergraduate BS degrees with the addition of Environmental Engineering and Management.

Through the College of Engineering, the university has been selected by the Association of Southeast Asian Nations to be part of the Southeast Asian Engineering Education Network (SEED-Net), the only Philippine private university in the network.

The College is located at the Velasco Hall, a building named after alumnus Geronimo Z. Velasco, who was a former President of the Philippine National Oil Company and Minister of Energy.

The College was renamed in 2011 after its donor, the Filipino-Chinese tycoon John Gokongwei.

== Academic departments ==
The College's academic programs are distributed among six academic departments.

=== Chemical Engineering ===
The Chemical Engineering Department currently handles the University's Bachelor of Science program in Chemical Engineering. This course has been offered continuously by the University since 1947. The department also offers specialization sub-areas in: Industrial Process Control, Environmental Engineering, Biotechnology, Energy Engineering, and Corrosion Engineering.

=== Civil Engineering ===
The Civil Engineering Department was established to provide the Philippines with engineers who will be able to contribute to the expansion of Philippine infrastructure. The department currently offers four specialization programs which are Construction Technology and Management Engineering, Hydraulics and Water Resources Engineering, Structural Engineering, and Transportation Engineering. Specialization in Geotechnical Engineering will be offered soon. There is a plan to open the 6th specialization, Environmental Engineering at the Laguna Campus.

The department has been recognized by the Commission on Higher Education (CHED) as a Center of Excellence.

=== Electronics and Communications Engineering ===
The Electronics and Communications Engineering Department is the largest department in the College.

Recognized by the Commission on Higher Education (CHED) as a Center of Excellence (one of only two in the country), its programs aim to establish expertise in electronics, communications, and digital signal processing.

=== Industrial Engineering ===
The programs of the Industrial Engineering Department cover Production and Operations Management, Operations Research/Management Science, and Ergonomics. The department has also been recognized by the CHED as a Center of Excellence.

=== Manufacturing Engineering and Management ===
The Manufacturing Engineering and Management Department of the College offers an interdisciplinary engineering course that integrates mechanical engineering, electronics engineering, computer studies, and modern management. This program is the first of its kind in the Philippines and is being offered with two specializations, Mechatronics and Robotics Engineering and Biomedical Engineering.

=== Mechanical Engineering ===
The Mechanical Engineering Department offers programs in the fields of Mechatronics, Mechanical Design, and Energy and Environmental Technology. It is a CHED-recognized Center of Excellence.

=== Computer Engineering ===
Computer Engineering is a combination of elements of Electronics and Communication Engineering, Electrical Engineering and Computer Science, which deals with the design, and utilization of computers. The parent discipline of Computer Engineering is Electrical Engineering with which it shares considerable commonality. Computer Engineering seeks to match efficient digital devices with appropriate software to meet the scientific, technological and administrative needs of business and industry in a global economy. The program provides students with a background that prepares them for careers in embedded systems design, computer system operations, and systems support.

== Program offerings ==
Velasco Hall

=== Undergraduate degree programs ===
- Bachelor of Science (BS) in Chemical Engineering
- BS in Civil Engineering with specialization in Construction Technology and Management
- BS in Civil Engineering with specialization in Hydraulics and Water Resources Engineering
- BS in Civil Engineering with specialization in Structural Engineering
- BS in Civil Engineering with specialization in Transportation Engineering
- BS in Computer Engineering
- BS in Electronics Engineering
- BS in Industrial Engineering
- BS in Industrial Management Engineering minor in Information Technology
- BS in Industrial Management Engineering minor in Service Management
- BS in Mechanical Engineering with concentration in Mechatronics Engineering
- BS in Manufacturing Engineering and Management with Specialization in Mechatronics and Robotics Engineering
- BS in Manufacturing Engineering and Management with Specialization in Biomedical Engineering

=== Graduate degree programs ===
==== Doctoral programs ====
- Doctor of Philosophy in Chemical Engineering
- Doctor of Philosophy in Civil Engineering
- Doctor of Philosophy in Electronics and Communications Engineering
- Doctor of Philosophy in Industrial Engineering
- Doctor of Philosophy in Mechanical Engineering

==== Master's degree programs ====
- Master of Science in Chemical Engineering
- Master of Science in Civil Engineering
- Master of Science in Electronics and Communication Engineering
- Master of Science in Environmental Engineering and Management
- Master of Science in Industrial Engineering
- Master of Science in Manufacturing Engineering and Management
- Master of Science in Mechanical Engineering

==== Non-thesis Master's degree programs ====
- Master in Engineering Science
- Master of Engineering Major in Chemical Engineering
- Master of Engineering Major in Civil Engineering
- Master of Engineering Major in Electronics and Communications Engineering
- Master of Engineering Major in Environmental Engineering and Management
- Master of Engineering Major in Industrial Engineering
- Master of Engineering Major in Manufacturing Engineering and Management
- Master of Engineering Major in Mechanical Engineering

== Student organizations ==
- Engineering College Government (ECG) former Engineering College Assembly (ECA)
- nth ENG Batch Government (Engineering Batch Government) former nth ENG Batch Assembly
- Association of Computer Engineering Students (ACCESS)
- Chemical Engineering Society (ChEn)
- Civil Engineering Society (CES)
- Industrial Management Engineering Society (IMES)
- Electronics and Communications Engineering Society (ECES)
- Mechanical Engineering Society (MES)
- Society of Manufacturing Engineers (SME)
- Society of Young Engineers Towards Achieving Excellence (SYNTAX)
- Student Association of Graduate Engineering School (SAGES)

== See also ==
- Electronics and Communications Engineering Society
