= De La Salle University College of Science =

Private college

College of Science
- Type: Private
- Established: 1982
- Dean: Mary Jane C. Flores
- Associate Dean: Regina M. Tresvalles
- Academic staff: 120
- Location: Malate, Manila, Philippines
- Website: www.dlsu.edu.ph/cos/

The College of Science (COS) of De La Salle University was originally part of the College of Arts and Sciences. In 1982, the departments of Biology, Chemistry, Mathematics and Physics separated to form the College of Science while the liberal arts departments formed the College of Liberal Arts. The engineering programs of the college have been granted the recognition of Center of Excellence in the Philippines by the Commission on Higher Education.
