= Br. Andrew Gonzalez College of Education =

Private college

- Dalubhasaan ng Pagpapanuto ng Br. Andrew Gonzalez
- Type: Private
- Established: 1936
- Dean: Dr. John Addy Garcia
- Associate Dean: Dr. Rochelle Irene Lucas
- Faculty: 141
- Undergraduates: 464
- Postgraduates: 869
- Location: Malate, Manila, Philippines
- Website: www.dlsu.edu.ph/colleges/bagced/

The Br. Andrew Gonzalez FSC College of Education (BAGCED) of De La Salle University is one of the oldest colleges in the university where it dates back to 1936 when De La Salle College was authorized to confer the degree of Master of Science in education. It was in 1959 when the college started to offer undergraduate degrees in education. The College of Education seeks to train students to be holistic, interdisciplinary, innovative, and culture-sensitive mentors. While the College of Education (CED) of the De La Salle University is the smallest college in terms of the undergraduate student population, it is the biggest college in terms of graduate student population.

The College of Education also provides professors and instructors for English and Physical Education subjects to freshmen. In July 2006, all CED offices and departments were transferred to the Br. Andrew Gonzalez Hall. The Gonzalez Hall, located between Fidel A. Reyes St. (Agno) and Taft Avenue, is where freshmen students attend their general education classes.

== Historical background ==
In 1963, the Graduate School of Education, Arts and Science (GSEAS) was established as a response to the need for updating secondary education in the country. GSEAS began to focus on tertiary education, and in 1976 it implemented a program for science teachers at the collegiate level. In 1980, GSEAS offered the first PhD program in Counseling Psychology in the country, and a PhD program in Science Education. By 1982, it also implemented a doctoral program in Educational Management, and later a Doctor of Arts in Language and Literature. When the GSEAS was dissolved, the La Salle Teacher Training Center was created to strengthen the existing education programs. In 1987, the Center became the La Salle School of Education, which was elevated to college status three years later.

On May 31, 2013, the college was renamed to Br. Andrew Gonzalez College of Education headed by V.P. and Past Dean Dr. Myrna Austria.

== Academic departments of BAGCED ==
=== Counseling and Educational Psychology ===
The Counseling and Educational Psychology Department aims to produce students who are proficient in teaching, research, counseling practice, career development, assessment, supervision, and consultation. Its graduates are envisioned to become outstanding professionals in the field of counseling and human development.

Its current chair is Dr. John Addy Garcia.

=== Educational Leadership and Management ===
The Educational Leadership and Management Department was established in June 2001 from start up University of the Philippines, under Dr. Roberto T. Borromeo, through the merger of the Educational Management Department and the Specialized Education Departments. Its academic programs aim to train and develop teachers and educational managers in the country.

The department is currently chaired by Dr. Michaela Perez Munoz.

=== English and Applied Linguistics ===
Prior to being a part of the College of Education, the Department of English and Applied Linguistics was part of the College of Liberal Arts as the Department of Languages. It then became a part of the College of Education as the English Language Department, finally becoming the Department of English and Applied Linguistics.

Its programs include offerings in the allied field of language education and applied linguistics. It has undergraduate courses, which are taken by all students of the university, regardless of college, that promote critical and technical reading and writing. It also runs the English Language Laboratory, which further develops and enhances the students' reading, writing, and oral communication skills.

Its current chair is Dr. Danilo T Dayag. Its faculty have included the late Br. Andrew Gonzalez FSC, former Secretary of Education, Culture, and Sports and former President of DLSU.

=== Physical Education ===
The Physical Education Department offers Physical Education and Fitness classes to the undergraduate students of the university. It also assists the university's Office of Sports Development in providing support to its athletes as well as responsibility for recommendations as regards the upkeep of the university's sports facilities and equipment.

Its program offerings include classes on body conditioning, physical fitness, basic motor and movement skills, individual, dual, and team sports, social recreation games, dance and rhythmic activities.

It is currently headed by Virgilia T. Calabio and its offices are located at the Enrique M. Razon Sports Center.

=== Science Education ===
The Science Education Department aims to produce competent educators and researchers of science and mathematics, with Bachelor of Secondary Education majors in Biology, Chemistry, Mathematics, and Physics.

Its current chair is Dr. Lydia Roleda.

== Lasallian Institute for Development and Educational Research ==
The Lasallian Institute for Development and Educational Research is tasked to undertake educational research to serve the needs of educational institutions, government, and non-governmental organizations. The institute also offers programs and services to improve the practice of teaching, to enhance the teaching-learning environment, and to influence education policy. It also affords training programs not only for the faculty of the university but also for other De La Salle University schools in the Philippines, external agencies, and organizations.

It currently publishes the academic journal, Tanglaw.

== Center for English Language Learning ==
The Center for English Language Learning gives students the opportunity to improve their English proficiency through short courses in General English, Grammar Review, among others. It is located at the Bro. Andrew Gonzales Hall and is headed by Dr. Leonisa A. Mojica.

== Undergraduate degree programs ==
- Bachelor of Science (BS) major in Early Childhood Education
- BS in Educational Psychology
- Bachelor of Secondary Education (BSE) major in English
- BSE major in Biology
- BSE major in Chemistry
- BSE major in Mathematics
- BSE major in mathematics with specialization in Computer Application
- BSE major in Physics
- BSE major in Physical Sciences

== Graduate degree programs ==
- Doctor of Education major in Educational Leadership and Management
- Doctor of Education major in Religious and Values Education
- Doctor of Philosophy in Applied Linguistics
- Doctor of Philosophy in Counseling Psychology
- Doctor of Philosophy in Science Education
- Doctor of Philosophy in Education major in Educational Leadership and Management
- Doctor of Philosophy in Science Education With areas of specialization: Biology, Chemistry, Mathematics & Physics
- Master of Arts in Counseling (Thesis/Non-Thesis Program)
- Master of Arts in Education major in Educational Technology
- Master of Arts in Education major in Educational Management
- Master of Arts in Education major in Educational Leadership & Management
- Master of Arts in Education major in Guidance and Counseling
- Master of Arts in English Language Education Specialization in Second Language Teaching
- Master of Arts in Education major in Special Education
- Master of Arts in Teaching General Science
- Master in Science Teaching; Areas of specialization: Biology, Chemistry, Mathematics & Physics
- Master of Arts in English Language Education Specialization in Second Language Teaching
- Master of Arts in English Language Education with specialization in English for Specific Purposes
- Master of Arts in Education major in Student Affairs and Services Management
- Master of Arts in Language Education major in English for Specific Purposes
- Master of Arts in Religious Formation
- Master of Arts in Teaching major in English Language
- Master of Arts in Teaching English Language
- Master of Arts in English Language Education with specialization in Reading Education
- Master of Arts major in School Counseling
- Master of Arts in Education major in Early Childhood Education
- Master of Education; Areas of Specialization: General Science, Biology, Chemistry, Mathematics and Physics
- Master of Education major in Biology
- Master of Education major in Chemistry
- Master of Education major in Educational Leadership
- Master of Education major in General Science
- Master of Education major in Mathematics
- Master of Education major in Physics
- Master of Education major in Religious and Values Education
- Master of Education major in School Leadership
- Master of Science in Education major in Measurement and Evaluation
- Master of Science in Guidance Counseling
- Master of Science in Teaching General Science
- Master of Science in Teaching major in Biology
- Master of Science in Teaching major in Chemistry
- Master of Science in Teaching major in Mathematics
- Master of Science in Teaching major in Physics

== Certificate and diploma programs ==
- Teacher Certificate Program
- Executive Program in Educational Leadership and Management
- Diploma in Community Counseling
- Diploma in School Counseling
