= Rafael Donato (academic) =

De La Salle Brother

Brother Rafael Donato FSC

President of De La Salle Araneta University
- In office 2006–2006

President of De La Salle Lipa
- In office 1995–2003

President of De La Salle University
- In office 1991–1994

President of La Salle College-Bacolod
- In office 1977–1983

President of La Salle Greenhills
- Second term 1983–1990
- First term 1970–1973

Personal details
- Born: Serafin Ramon Rivero Donato; October 12, 1938 Vigan City, Ilocos Sur, Philippines
- Died: November 2, 2006 (aged 68) Morong, Bataan, Philippines

Brother Rafael S. Donato FSC was a Filipino Lasallian Brother and academic who led several Lasallian educational institutions in the Philippines. Throughout his career, he successively served as president of La Salle Green Hills, La Salle College-Bacolod (now University of St. La Salle), De La Salle University-Manila, De La Salle Lipa, and De La Salle Araneta University.

== Biography ==
Donato finished grade school in 1952, high school in 1956, and a Bachelor of Science in Education, majoring in English literature with a minor in Philosophy in 1961 all at De La Salle College. In 1956, he decided to become a De La Salle Brother.

Donato then earned his Master's degree in English as a Second Language and Linguistics at Columbia University in 1965 as a Fulbright scholar. Another Fulbright grant allowed him to travel to Europe and Vietnam.

In the 1970s, Donato became the first Filipino Director of De La Salle Lipa and the first Filipino President of La Salle Green Hills. In 1974, he received a Certificate of Advanced Studies from Harvard and in 1976, he earned his Doctor of Education degree in Administration, Planning and Social Policy. Upon his return to the Philippines, he was then assigned to La Salle College Bacolod in Bacolod City, Negros Occidental as its first Filipino president.

Donato was appointed Brother Visitor and concurrent President of La Salle Green Hills in Mandaluyong, Metro Manila from 1983 to 1990. He then served as President of De La Salle University-Manila from 1991 to 1994. In 1994, he became a British Council Fellow for Peace Studies at the University of Bradford in the United Kingdom. In 1995, he received another fellowship from the Hebrew University of Jerusalem's Truman Institute for Peace.

He was then appointed President of De La Salle Lipa in Lipa City, Batangas on May 15, 1995, and served in that capacity until 2003, at which time he was named President Emeritus for his role in the expansion of the school.

Donato was at the time of his death the Auxiliary Visitor of the Philippine District as well as President of De La Salle Araneta University in Malabon, Metro Manila effective SY 2006–2007. He was also a faculty member of the Educational Leadership and Management Department of De La Salle University Manila's College of Education. On October 16, 2006, he celebrated his 50th year as a De La Salle Brother in ceremonies held at La Salle Green Hills.

On November 2, 2006, Donato was reported missing after a few hours of swimming off the shores of Morong, Bataan. His body was found at 8:30 p.m., six hours after he was reported missing and one kilometer away from where he was last seen. His remains were subsequently driven back to Manila.

== See also ==
- List of people from De La Salle University-Manila

| Preceded by Br. Armin Luistro FSC | President of De La Salle Araneta University; 2006 | Succeeded by Br. Ricardo Laguda FSC |
| Preceded by Br. Andrew Gonzalez FSC | President of De La Salle University-Manila and the De La Salle University System; 1991-1994 | Succeeded by Br. Andrew Gonzalez FSC |
| Preceded by Br. Narciso Erguiza FSC | President of De La Salle Lipa; 1995-2003 | Succeeded by Br. Manuel Pajarillo FSC |
| Preceded by Br. Victor Franco FSC | Brother Visitor of the De La Salle Brothers in the Philippines; 1983-1990 | Succeeded by Br. Raymundo Suplido FSC |
