= Ramon V. del Rosario College of Business =

Coordinates: 14.5648°N 120.9931°E

Ramon V. del Rosario College of Business (RVR-COB)
- Dalubhasaan ng Komersiyo ng Ramon V. del Rosario
- Type: Private
- Established: 1920
- Dean: Dr. Emilina Sarreal
- Associate Dean: Dr. Cynthia P. Cudia
- Location: Malate, Manila, Philippines
- Website: https://www.dlsu.edu.ph/colleges/rvrcob/

The College of Business (COB), also known as Ramon V. del Rosario College of Business and formerly De La Salle-Professional Schools, Inc. (DLS-PSI), is one of the eight undergraduate and graduate schools of De La Salle University (DLSU). It was established in 1920 as the College of Commerce when the University began offering a two-year commercial course. In 1931, the Bachelor of Science in Commerce degree was first conferred after a third year was added to the initial two-year program.

In 1957, the College underwent its formal first survey by the Philippine Accrediting Association of Schools, Colleges, and Universities (PAASCU). Now known as the College of Business and Economics, it is home to two academic departments, which have been recognized by the Commission on Higher Education as Centers of Development, Business Management and Economics.

In A.Y. 2010-2011, the College of Business and Economics formally separated into two entities: The College of Business (COB) and the School of Economics (SOE). College of Business focuses on attracting students who aspire to become business professionals or professors of the faculty who would like to share their knowledge to help other aspiring students in their formation as business professionals.

Students of COB may opt to specialize in any of the following fields: Accountancy, Business Management or Applied Corporate Management, Legal Management, Management of Financial Institutions, Marketing Management, and Advertising Management.

The College also offers a double-degree (Liberal Arts-Commerce or LIA-COM) program in partnership with the College of Liberal Arts, that combines a Bachelor of Arts major with that of Accountancy or Commerce, major in any other business program. Its administrative offices are located at the St. La Salle Hall.

It is currently the largest College of the University in terms of students. Many of its alumni have distinguished themselves, assuming top-level positions in the academe, business and industry, and government, such as José W. Diokno, Alberto Romulo, and Enrique Zobel.

On July 25, 2011, the college was inaugurated as Ramon V. del Rosario College of Business (RVR-COB) to honor this respected alumnus and visionary businessman. This is the first time DLSU attached a name to one of its colleges. Ramon V. del Rosario built the first Filipino-owned oil refinery, Filoil Refinery Corporation, and challenged foreign oil companies. Afterwards, he also served as ambassador to Canada, Germany, and Japan. During this time, he brought professors from the Harvard Business School into the country to teach management courses. This initiative eventually led to the creation of Asian Institute of Management (AIM), an institution that meets the global accreditation standards of the US-based Association to Advance Collegiate Schools of Business (AACSB).

== Undergraduate Degree Programs and Code ==
- Bachelor of Science in Accountancy (BSA)
- Bachelor of Science in Applied Corporate Management (APC)
- Bachelor of Science in Advertising Management (ADV)
- Bachelor of Science in Business Management (MGT)
- Bachelor of Science in Management of Financial Institutions (FIN)
- Bachelor of Science in Legal Management (LGL)
- Bachelor of Science in Marketing Management (MKT)
- Bachelor of Science in Entrepreneurship (BS-ENT)
- Bachelor of Science in Interdisciplinary Business Studies (IBS)

== Student organizations ==
- AdCreate Society (ADC)
- Business Management Society (BMS)
- Junior Philippine Institute of Accountants- DLSU Chapter (JPIA-DLSU)
- Junior Entrepreneurs' Marketing Association (JEMA)
- Management of Financial Institutions Association (MaFiA)
- Ley La Salle (LLS)
- Young Entrepreneurs Society (YES)
