= Sinag =

Solar-powered race car

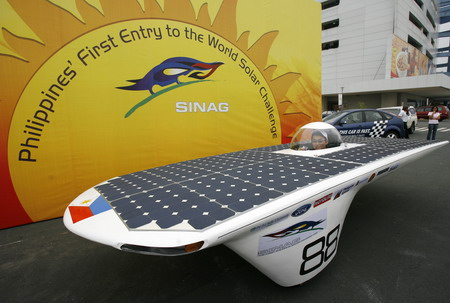

Overview
- Assembly: De La Salle University
- Designer: De La Salle University

Powertrain
- Battery: 5.9 kWh lithium-ion

Dimensions
- Wheelbase: 1,700.54 mm (67.0 in)
- Length: 4,799.25 mm (188.9 in)
- Width: 1,748.48 mm (68.8 in)
- Height: 1,132.05 mm (44.6 in)
- Curb weight: 290 kg (639 lb)

Chronology
- Successor: Sikat I

Sinag (stylized in all caps; Filipino for 'sun ray'), based in De La Salle University in the Philippines, is the first Philippine solar-powered race car and the first entry of the Philippines to the World Solar Challenge.

== Background and design ==
The design and construction of Sinag undertaken by a group of and students from the mechanical engineering and electronic engineering department of the De La Salle University in Manila backed by various corporate sponsors. Robert Obiles is the overall team leader and Rene Fernandez is the overall technical project leader. Other members include Jack Catalan, Isidro Marfori, Emmanuel Gonzales, Noriel Mallari, Ivan Porcalla, Sherwin To, Prince Ang, Mico Villena, Martin Sy-Quia, Vincent Yao, Kaiser Fernandez, Walter Chua, and Eric Tan.

The Sinag is a solar car which cost ₱9 million to make. is a three-wheeled single-seater vehicle made of carbon fiber with its bottom part having foam core material. The top view of Sinag is 4,799.25 by 1,748.48 millimeters (188.95 in × 68.84 in) While the height of the vehicle is 1,132.05 millimeters (44.569 in). The wheelbase is 1,700.54 millimeters (66.950 in). It weighs 290 kg (640 lb).

Sinag is powered by its 403-cells 6 square meters (65 sq ft) solar array and it is equipped by a 5.9 kWh lithium-ion battery.

== Operational history ==
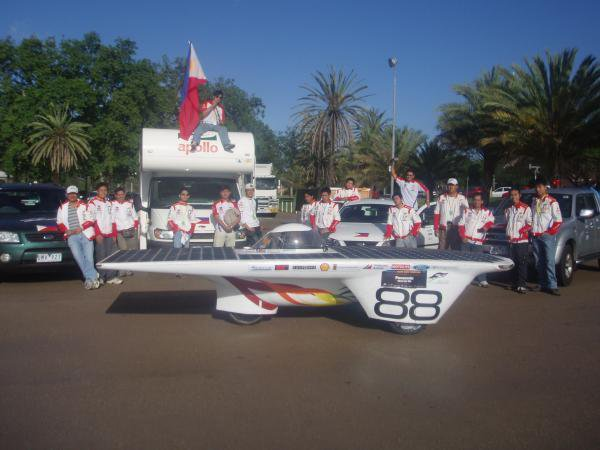
The Sinag in Adelaide, Australia.

Sinag was built and designed in less than a year for the 2007 edition of the World Solar Challenge, a race in Australia for solar-powered cars. It is the Philippines' debut in the race which was first held in 1987. Sinag was earlier launched on January 27, 2007, at NBC Tent, Fort Bonifacio, Taguig.

The country represented by Team Sinag operating Sinag finished 12th place from 40 participants. The event was a 3,000 km (1,900 mi) race. Sinag with lead driver Eric Tan started in Darwin on October 21, reached Alice Springs on October 24, and finished the race in Adelaide on October 27. However there's a slightly conflicting information, with records showing the team covered a distance of the 2,691 km (1,672 mi) and finished 12th.

== Successors ==
Sinag was succeeded by at least three more models, namely Sikat I in 2009, Sikat II in 2011, and Sikat II-A in 2013.
