= De La Salle University School of Economics =

Private college

School of Economics
- Paaralan ng Ekonomiks
- Type: Private
- Established: 1920; established as a separate college in 2010
- Chairperson: Dr. Mariel Monica Sauler
- Dean: Dr. Arlene Inocencio
- Associate Dean: Dr. Mitzie Irene Conchada
- Location: Malate, Manila, Philippines

The College of Business and Economics of DLSU-Manila, Philippines has formally separated into two entities: the De La Salle University School of Economics and the College of Business. Accomplished in 2010, this created a distinct and concentrated academic entity in the university. The main objective of the School of Economics is for the better understanding of the issues surrounding the economic policies found and implemented not only in politics or government, but also in businesses or firms that affect humanity and work.

The Department of Economics is one of only two CHED Centers of Development of the former College of Business and Economics. It aims to produce students that are well-versed with economic principles, policies, and research methodologies, as well as allowing Economics majors to specialize in any one of the following: labor economics, public finance, environmental economics, financial economics, and agricultural economics among others.

De La Salle University is currently ranked as the top Philippine private university in economics and econometrics according to the 2021 edition of the QS World University Rankings by Subject. The university has also been named the top Philippine university for Business and Economics in the 2021 Times Higher Education (THE) World University Rankings.

The School of Economics offers two distinct and focused undergraduate programs under the Applied Economics program dividing into: Industrial Economics and Financial Economics. That is, Bachelor of Science in Applied Economics major in Industrial Economics and Bachelor of Science in Applied Economics major in Financial Economics. A Bachelor of Arts in Economics is offered for those who are more interested in a multi-disciplinary and public policy approach

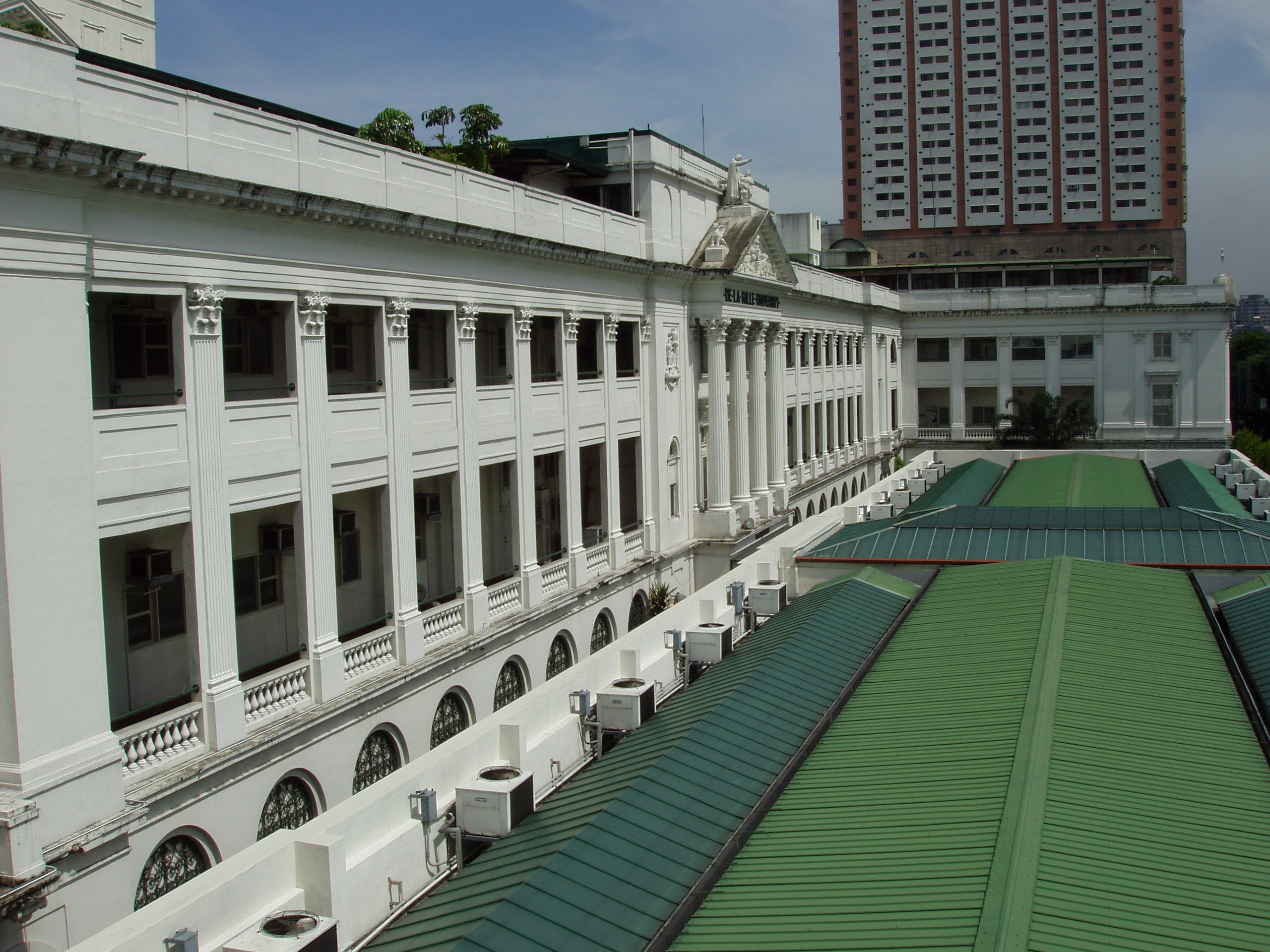
St. La Salle Hall

== Faculty ==
The faculty of the department are holders of advanced academic degrees and are noted in the academe, such as Dr. Tereso Tullao Jr., current executive director of the Center for Business and Economics Research and Development, past dean of the College of Business and Economics, and who was cited as one of the most outstanding teachers in the Philippines in 1993 by the Metrobank Foundation, Dr. Angelo Unite, whose paper, The Effect of Capital Market Liberalization Measures on the Integration of the Philippine Stock Market with International Markets: Evidence from Johansen’s Multivariate Cointegration Procedure, won an Outstanding Scientific Paper award in the 2005 National Academy of Science and Technology Awards, Dr. Ponciano Intal Jr., who was a member of the editorial board of the Philippine Journal of Development and former executive director of the DLSU-Angelo King Institute for Economic and Business Studies, and Dr. Lawrence Dacuycuy, who is the current dean of the college and Mr. Marvin Raymond Castell as its new vice dean.

== Degree Offerings ==
=== Undergraduate Degree Programs ===
- Bachelor of Science in Applied Economics major in Industrial Economics
- Bachelor of Science in Applied Economics major in Industrial Economics and Bachelor of Science in Applied Corporate Management
- Bachelor of Science in Applied Economics major in Industrial Economics and Bachelor of Science in Accountancy
- Bachelor of Science in Applied Economics major in Industrial Economics and Bachelor of Science in Business Management
- Bachelor of Science in Applied Economics major in Industrial Economics and Bachelor of Science in Management of Financial Institutions
- Bachelor of Science in Applied Economics major in Industrial Economics and Bachelor of Science in Marketing Management
- Bachelor of Science in Applied Economics major in Industrial Economics and Bachelor of Science in Advertising Management
- Bachelor of Science in Applied Economics major in Industrial Economics and Bachelor of Science in Legal Management
- Bachelor of Science in Applied Economics major in Financial Economics
- Bachelor of Science in Applied Economics major in Financial Economics and Bachelor of Science in Applied Corporate Management
- Bachelor of Science in Applied Economics major in Financial Economics and Bachelor of Science in Accountancy
- Bachelor of Science in Applied Economics major in Financial Economicsand Bachelor of Science in Business Management
- Bachelor of Science in Applied Economics major in Financial Economics and Bachelor of Science in Management of Financial Institutions
- Bachelor of Science in Applied Economics major in Financial Economics and Bachelor of Science in Marketing Management
- Bachelor of Science in Applied Economics major in Financial Economics and Bachelor of Science in Advertising Management
- Bachelor of Science in Applied Economics major in Financial Economics and Bachelor of Science in Legal Management
- Bachelor of Arts in Economics
- Bachelor of Arts in Economics and Bachelor of Science in Applied Corporate Management
- Bachelor of Arts in Economics and Bachelor of Science in Accountancy
- Bachelor of Arts in Economics and Bachelor of Science in Business Management
- Bachelor of Arts in Economics and Bachelor of Science in Management of Financial Institutions
- Bachelor of Arts in Economics and Bachelor of Science in Marketing Management
- Bachelor of Arts in Economics and Bachelor of Science in Advertising Management
- Bachelor of Arts in Economics and Bachelor of Science in Legal Management

=== Ladderized and Graduate Degree Programs ===
- Bachelor of Science in Applied Economics and Master of Science in Economics
- Master of Science in Economics and Doctor of Philosophy in Economics
- Master of Science in Economics

== Angelo King Institute for Economic Research and Development ==
The Angelo King Institute for Economic Research and Development was established to address the need of providing and undertaking research for use by government, businesses, and the academe. It aims to translate theory into actual projects and provide other services, which would ensure its implementation.

It also publishes the academic journal called DLSU Business and Economics Review.

The institute's director is currently Dr. Tereso Tullao.

== Student Organization ==
- Economics Organization (EconOrg)

== Student Government ==
- School of Economics Government - the Collegiate Student Government
- Excellence Driven Economics Leaders - the Batch Student Government

== Notes ==
1. A Brief Biography of Tereso S. Tullao, Jr.
2. De La Salle faculty, alumnus reap NAST awards
3. Philippine Journal of Development
