= Animo =

Latin legal term

Animo is a Latin legal term meaning 'with intention' or 'with purpose'.

Animo can be neutral or negative, "a double edged sword," but is more often negative - and rarely positive. It was formerly used only in criminal law, but later in tort cases, which was used by juries to determine "ill will" of the defendant, as in 'animosity'.

A number of Latinisms developed: animo furandi (intent to steal), animo felonico (intent to commit a felony), and animo defamadi (intent to defame). These were all negative, but neutral forms arose in estate law: animo testandi (animus testandi or testamentary intent) and animo revocandi (intent to revoke a will). Additional Latinisms include animo manendi (intent to remain) and animo revertendi (intent to return), which are essential elements of domicile.

Animus nocendi, derived from the word, is still used to describe the intent to commit a crime, and animus donandi to show the intent to give a gift or bequest.
