= Andrew Gonzalez =

Filipino linguist, writer and educator

Brother Andrew Gonzalez FSC

45th Secretary of Education, Culture, and Sports
- In office July 1, 1998 – January 22, 2001
- President: Joseph Estrada; Gloria Macapagal Arroyo
- Preceded by: Erlinda Pefianco
- Succeeded by: Raul Roco

President Emeritus of De La Salle University
- In office 2005–2006

President of De La Salle University
- In office 1978–1991
- Preceded by: Bro. Hyacinth Gabriel Connon, F.S.C.
- Succeeded by: Bro. Rafael Donato, F.S.C.
- In office 1994–1998
- Preceded by: Bro. Rafael Donato, F.S.C.
- Succeeded by: Bro. Rolando Dizon, F.S.C.

President of De La Salle University System
- In office 1987–1991
- Preceded by: None
- Succeeded by: Bro. Rafael Donato, F.S.C.
- In office 1994–1998
- Preceded by: Bro. Rafael Donato, F.S.C.
- Succeeded by: Bro. Rolando Dizon, F.S.C.

Personal details
- Born: Macario Diosdado Arnedo Gonzalez; February 29, 1940 Manila, Commonwealth of the Philippines
- Died: January 29, 2006 (aged 65) Dasmariñas, Cavite
- Education: Saint Mary's University of Minnesota; University of California, Berkeley; Catholic University of America; Philippine Normal University
- Occupation: Linguist, Writer, and Educator

Brother Andrew Benjamin Gonzalez FSC (February 29, 1940 – January 29, 2006) was a Filipino linguist, writer, educator, and a De La Salle Brother. He served as president of De La Salle University from 1979 to 1991 and from 1994 to 1998. From 1998 to 2001 he served as Secretary of the Department of Education, Culture and Sports under the presidency of Joseph Estrada. After his term ended, he returned to De La Salle University as vice president for Academics and Research from 2001 to 2003 and as Presidential Adviser for Academics and Research from 2003 to 2005.

He earned his Ph.D. in linguistics from the University of California, Berkeley.

== Early life ==
Gonzalez was born as Macario Diosdado Arnedo Gonzalez in Manila to Augusto Gonzalez, a prominent businessman, wealthy landowner, and the son of Dr. Joaquin Gonzalez; and Rosario Arnedo, daughter of Pampanga Governor Macario Arnedo.

Gonzalez attended and completed grade school at De La Salle College in Manila. He was a consistent honor student and graduated as salutatorian. He also finished his high school at De La Salle College in 1955 as Valedictorian. His love for teaching made him decide to become a De La Salle Christian Brother. He finished his novitiate at the De La Salle Retreat House in Baguio on November 20, 1955, and made his initial vows the year after. He joined the Scholasticate of the De La Salle Christian Brothers in Winona, Minnesota, U.S.A. on December 10, 1956. He studied at Saint Mary's University of Minnesota, a Christian Brother-run college in Winona and earned his Bachelor of Arts degree at the top of his class at the age of 19. He obtained his Master of Arts in English Literature from The Catholic University of America in Washington, D.C., the year after.

He returned to the Philippines in 1960 and began teaching English Language and Literature at the high school department of La Salle College in Bacolod, Negros Occidental. He served in several administrative positions at De La Salle College in Manila from 1964 to 1967 and made his final vows as a De La Salle Brother on May 30, 1965. He took up graduate courses in linguistics in the Philippine Normal College. He was admitted to the doctoral program in linguistics at the University of California, Berkeley as a Regent's Fellow in Linguistics and as a Stanley Tasheira Scholar in 1967 and completed the PhD degree in 1970.

== Return to the Philippines ==
Gonzalez returned to the Philippines in 1971 where he was chosen to become the chairman of the Humanities Department of De La Salle College and was promoted to Academic Vice President from 1971 to 1978. Upon the sudden death of then-De La Salle University President Br. H. Gabriel Connon FSC, Gonzalez became the Acting President. In recognition of his exceptional management ability, he was elected as the president of De La Salle University by the board of trustees in 1979 and served until 1991. After his term as university president, he was designated as president of Manila Bulletin Publishing Corporation, and in 1994 he was elected to his second term as president of De La Salle University-Manila where he served until 1998. He was appointed as the Secretary of the Department of Education, Culture and Sports during the term of President Joseph Ejercito Estrada in July 1998 and served until January 2001. During his term as DECS Secretary he got involved with the Ford Expedition Scandal. He rejoined De La Salle University-Manila as vice president for Academics and Research from 2001 to 2003 and as Presidential Adviser for Academics and Research from 2003 to 2005. Manila Bulletin gave him the title of President Emeritus on January 26, 2006.

== As President of De La Salle University-Manila ==
As president of De La Salle University - Manila, he conceptualized the De La Salle University System and helped expand the range of Lasallian education in the Philippines. Brother Andrew established the College of Career Development of De La Salle University - Manila which became the De La Salle-College of Saint Benilde and took over a college and a medical school in Dasmariñas, Cavite which respectively became De La Salle University-Dasmariñas and the De La Salle Medical and Health Sciences Institute. He prioritized graduate education by creating new masteral and doctoral degree programs. He also wrote many books in linguistics and education. Under his term, De La Salle University-Manila underwent significant developments as an institution of higher learning, particularly in the areas of research and faculty and program development. He also promoted Alumni activities, and boosted scholarly activities on campus. For example, he made his private collection of books available to members of the public, especially ones interested in learning about applied linguistics.

== As Education Secretary ==
He initiated the revision of the Basic Education Curriculum and placed a corruption-free procurement system which significantly reduced the costs of textbooks and supplies purchased by the Department of Education, Culture and Sports. He initiated the changing of language of instruction to the regional language for the first three grades.

== Recognition ==
In recognition of Gonzalez's achievements, he received awards from the City of Manila, National Press Club, Adamson University and from San Beda College. He received honorary doctorate degrees from Waseda University and Soka University in Japan, St. Paul University in Canada and from St. Mary's College of California. De La Salle University-Manila granted him the title of President Emeritus on September 28, 2005, and DLSU-Manila's new state-of-the-art 20-storey General Education Building was named the Br. Andrew Gonzalez Hall.

Apalit Technical Vocational High School in San Juan, Apalit, Pampanga was renamed Bro. Andrew Gonzalez Technical High School in his honor.

== Death ==
Gonzalez died due to complications of diabetes on January 29, 2006, at the De La Salle University Medical Center of De La Salle Medical and Health Sciences Institute in Dasmariñas, Cavite. His remains were brought to the De La Salle Brothers' Mausoleum at Lipa City, Batangas.

Academic offices
Preceded by Bro. Hyacinth Gabriel Connon, F.S.C. Bro. Rafael Donato, F.S.C.	President—De La Salle University-Manila; 1978-1991; 1994-1998	Succeeded by Bro. Rafael Donato, F.S.C. Bro. Rolando Dizon, F.S.C.
Preceded by None; Bro. Rafael Donato, F.S.C.	President—De La Salle University System; 1987-1991; 1994-1998	Succeeded by Bro. Rafael Donato, F.S.C. Bro. Rolando Dizon, F.S.C.
Political offices
Preceded by Erlinda Pefianco	Secretary of Education, Culture and Sports; 1998-2001	Succeeded by Raul Roco
