= List of theaters and concert halls in Metro Manila =

This list of performing art centers and theaters in Manila includes present-day performing arts theaters, concert halls, music halls and other places of live entertainment in Metro Manila, Philippines. It excludes theatrical companies, sports stadia, other outdoor venues and convention centers which may occasionally be used for concerts.

Venue	Room	Opened	Location	Capacity
ABS-CBN Broadcasting Center	Dolphy Theater	1968	Diliman, Quezon City	300
Adamson University	Adamson University Theater	1995	Ermita, Manila	700
Amoranto Theater		2006	Paligsahan, Quezon City	800
Ateneo de Manila University	Henry Lee Irwin Theater	1994	Loyola Heights, Quezon City	1,131
Ateneo de Manila University	Leong Hall Auditorium	2008	Loyola Heights, Quezon City	476
Ateneo de Manila University	Areté Hyundai Hall	2017	Loyola Heights, Quezon City	840
Ateneo de Manila University	Doreen Black Box Theater	2017	Loyola Heights, Quezon City	200
BGC Arts Center	Globe Auditorium	2017	Bonifacio Global City, Taguig	200
BGC Arts Center	Maybank Performing Arts Theater	2017	Bonifacio Global City, Taguig	500
Camp Aguinaldo	AFP Museum and Multi-Purpose Theater		Camp Aguinaldo, Quezon City	1,074
Circuit Makati	Samsung Performing Arts Theater	2022	Carmona, Makati	1,520
Colegio San Agustin – Makati	Saint Ambrose Hall	1980, renovated in 2005	Dasmariñas Village, Makati	1,100
De La Salle University	Teresa Yuchengco Auditorium	2002	Malate, Manila	1,100
Far Eastern University	FEU Auditorium	1949	Sampaloc, Manila	1,040
Far Eastern University	Ground floor Arts Building	1998	Sampaloc, Manila	400
Far Eastern University	FEU Mini Auditorium	2005	Sampaloc, Manila	700
Far Eastern University	FEU Communication Arts Student Theater	1990	Sampaloc, Manila	300
Greenbelt	OnStage Greenbelt		Ayala Center, Makati	800
Greenhills	Music Museum	1988	Greenhills, San Juan	718
Insular Life Corporate Centre	Insular Life Auditorium	2001	Alabang, Muntinlupa	524
New Frontier Theater		1965, renovated in 2015	Cubao, Quezon City	2,385
Meralco Theater		1969	Ortigas Center, Pasig	1,000
Metropolitan Theater		1931	Ermita, Manila	1,670 (under renovation)
Metro Concert Bar			Paltok, Quezon City	1,000
PAGCOR Airport Casino Filipino	PAGCOR Grand Theater	1998	Santo Niño, Parañaque	2,000
PETA Theater Center	PETA-PHINMA Theater	2005	New Manila, Quezon City	450
Philam Life Theater		1961	Ermita, Manila	780 (closed for redevelopment)
RCBC Plaza	Carlos Romulo Auditorium	2001	Bel-Air, Makati	450
Resorts World Manila	Newport Performing Arts Theater	2010	Newport City, Pasay	1,500
Rizal Park	Rizal Park Open Air Auditorium		Ermita, Manila	
SM Aura Premier	Samsung Hall	2013	Bonifacio Global City, Taguig	1,000
SM City North EDSA	Sky Dome	2009	Diliman, Quezon City	1,500
Solaire Resort & Casino	The Theatre at Solaire	2015	Entertainment City, Parañaque	1,740
St. Scholastica's College, Manila	Saint Cecilia's Hall	1932	Malate, Manila	995
Star City	Aliw Theater	2002	Cultural Center of the Philippines Complex, Pasay	1,275
Star City	Star Theater		Cultural Center of the Philippines Complex, Pasay	850
Tanghalang Francisco Balagtas (Francisco Balagtas Theater); Folk Arts Theater		1974	Cultural Center of the Philippines Complex, Malate, Manila	8,458
Tanghalang Pambansa (National Theater)	Tanghalang Nicanor Abelardo (Main Theater); Nicanor Abelardo Theater	1969	Cultural Center of the Philippines Complex, Malate, Manila	1,821
Tanghalang Pambansa (National Theater)	Tanghalang Aurelio Tolentino (Little Theater); Aurelio Tolentino Theater	1969	Cultural Center of the Philippines Complex, Malate, Manila	421
Tanghalang Pambansa (National Theater)	Tanghalang Huseng Batute (Studio Theater); Huseng Batute Theater	1969	Cultural Center of the Philippines Complex, Malate, Manila	250
Tanghalang Pasigueño	Asamblea Magna (Main Theater)		San Nicolas, Pasig	1,300
Tanghalang Pasigueño	Nagsabado Hall (Mini Theater)		San Nicolas, Pasig	60
Tanghalang Pasigueño	Dalampasigan Hall (Mini Theater)		San Nicolas, Pasig	60
Teatro Marikina		2002	Santa Elena, Marikina	1,100
University of Makati	University of Makati Grand Theater (shortly: Grand Theater)		West Rembo, Taguig	1,000
University of the Philippines Diliman	Dalisay J. Aldaba Hall	1960	Diliman, Quezon City	211
University of the Philippines Diliman	Cine Adarna of UP Film Institute		Diliman, Quezon City	800
University of the Philippines Diliman	Wilfrido Ma. Guerrero Theater	1951	Diliman, Quezon City	300
TIU Theater	UP Theater	1960	Makati City	2,000

== See also ==
- Art Deco theaters of Manila
