= List of Art Deco theaters in Metro Manila =

The following is a list of Art Deco theaters in Metro Manila, theaters constructed in the 1930s to 1950s built in Art Deco style, or a similar branch of the style like Streamline Moderne, in the Philippines. The construction of these early theaters in the Manila metropolitan area provided the venue for early forms of entertainment like bodabil, a local adaptation of vaudeville, with most eventually converting to movie theaters with the growth and popularity of Philippine cinema in the metropolis, while some were showing American films. Several theaters built within the city of Manila were designed by prominent Philippine architects, including future National Artists Juan Nakpil and Pablo Antonio. Many of these theaters have since been closed and several of them demolished, while movie theaters in the Philippines shifted to shopping mall-based movie theaters.

== Performing arts theaters ==
=== Ateneo Auditorium ===
Once described as "the best theater in the Orient," this theater was on Dakota Street in Ermita. The construction of the auditorium began in May 1935 and was completed in time for the commencement ceremony in 1936. Its architect, Juan Nakpil, was an Ateneo alumnus. The hall had six hundred seats on the ground floor and 193 more in the cantilevered boxes. There were boxes upstairs, and four proscenia. Other features were a projection room and nineteen dressing rooms. The theater was badly damaged in February 1945 during the Battle of Manila, and its ruins were later demolished.

=== FEU Auditorium ===
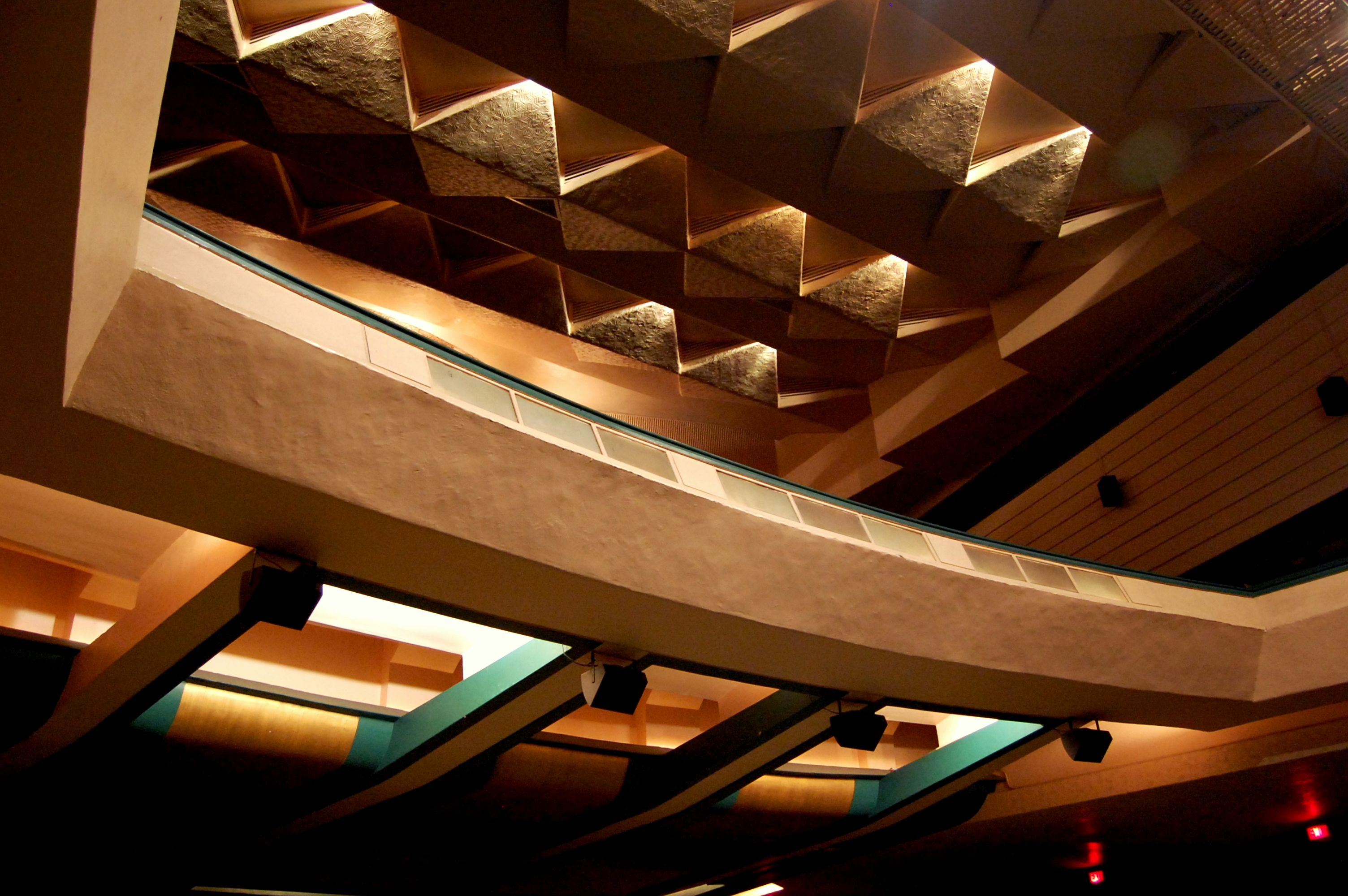
FEU Auditorium ceiling

The FEU Auditorium is the Administration Building's centerpiece. It houses 1,040 seats and occupies three floors of the four-story building.

Art Deco features abound in the design of the Auditorium and include the gradual curves, the ribbed piers and geometric volumes and patterns. Above the orchestra section are star or diamond like patterns which also serve as lighting fixtures. Above the balcony are triangles which also serve as air conditioning ducts. These, together with the green and gold theme, and the subtle lettering of "FEU" under the boxes were all combined in a regal manner. The interior was restored in 2002-2003 and was also infused with new lighting, sound and video equipment. It was the only postwar venue with air-conditioning and a revolving stage. It used to be the Cultural Center of the Philippines in the 1950s given that all the foremost Filipino and foreign performers of the time performed there.

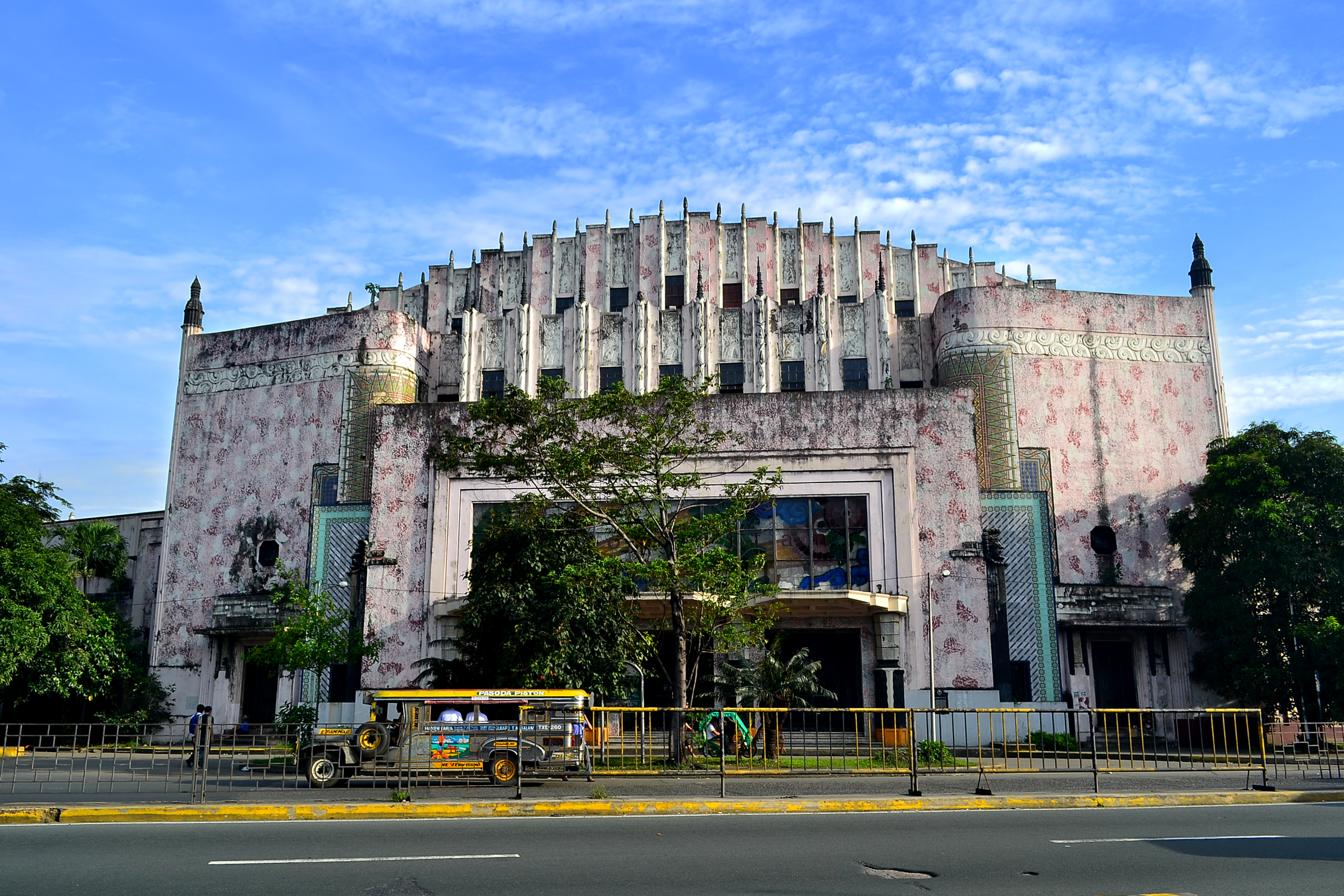
Manila Metropolitan Theater

=== Manila Metropolitan Theater ===
The Manila Metropolitan Theater is located on Padre Burgos Avenue, Ermita district adjacent to the Mehan Garden. The theater was built in 1931 with an Art Deco design by architects Juan M. Arellano and Otillio Arellano and could accommodate as many as 1,670 people. The theater is endowed with bronze sculptures depicting female performers designed by Francesco Riccardo Monti, a stained glass mural mounted above the main audience entrance, and relief woodcarvings of Philippine plants found in the interior lobby made by Isabelo Tampingco. The theater was restored in 1978, but was again closed in 1996 due to lack support from the public and local officials. Its east wing was used as an office space for government services.

The theater has undergone renovations which began in 2018, and is now opened on December 10, 2021.

=== Saint Cecilia's Hall ===
Saint Cecilia's Hall is located at St. Scholastica's College Manila.

=== Saint Theresa's College Auditorium ===
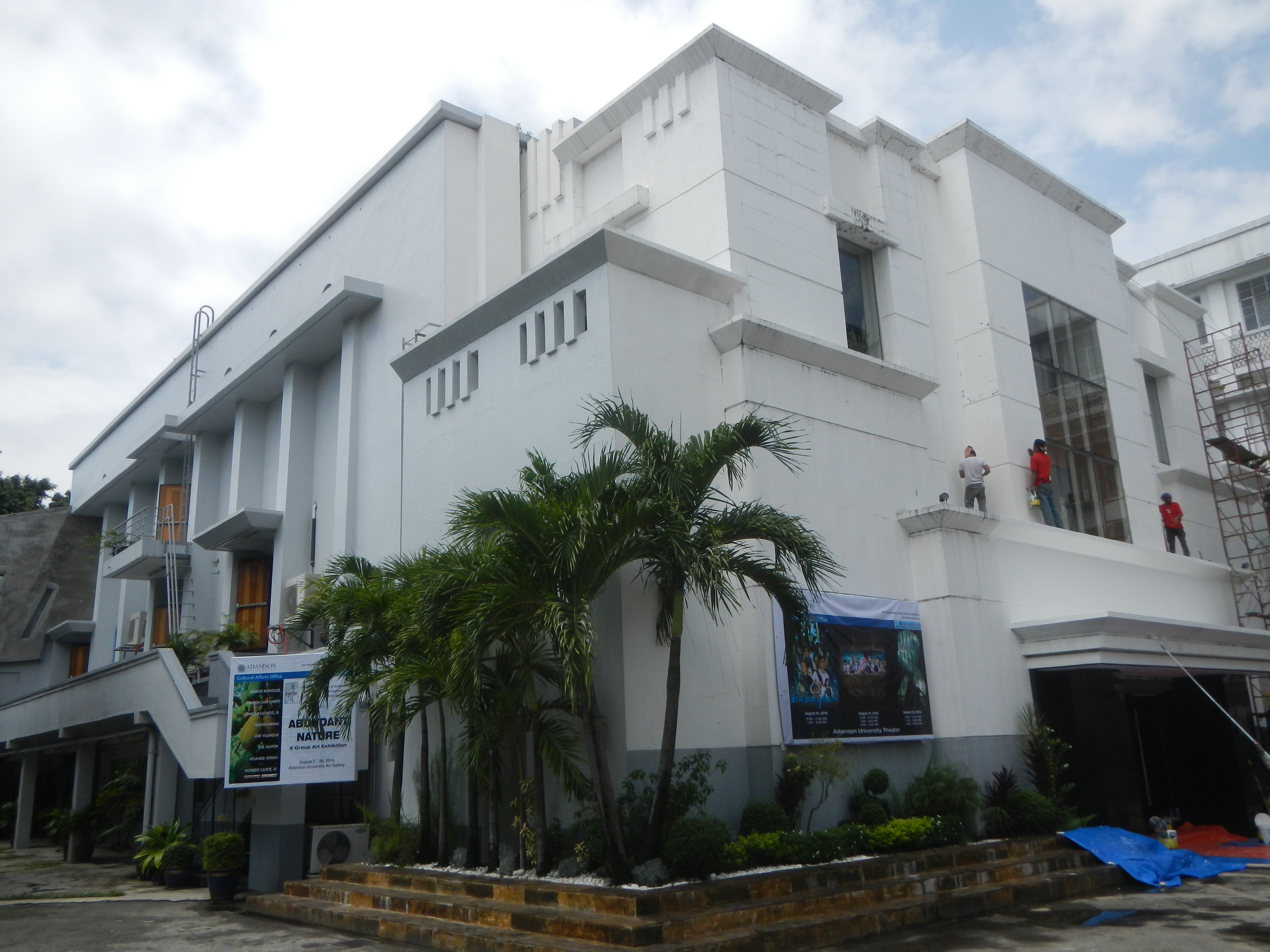

This theater, which was completed in 1940 under the direction of the engineer Carlos Quisumbing, is located on San Marcelino Street and was renamed the Adamson University Theater. It was remodeled in 2004, and its most notable Streamline Moderne features that remain are the circular windows near the top of the sides of the building.

=== U.P. University Theater ===
This theater was on Taft Avenue.

=== Wilfrido Ma. Guerrero Theater ===
Located at the second floor of Palma Hall, Roxas Avenue, University of the Philippines Diliman Campus.

=== Zorilla Theatre ===
A former venue for Spanish-language and Tagalog-language stage performances which was located along Recto Avenue.

== Movie theaters ==
=== Avenue Theater ===
Another architectural work by Juan Nakpil was the Avenue Theater, which was located on the west side of Rizal Avenue in Santa Cruz, Manila. When it was inaugurated in January 1939, it was considered to be the largest and most luxurious movie theater of the colony. It had a 1,470 seating capacity with its lobby bearing a Belgian marble finish flooring and it exclusively showed Paramount Pictures films in the Philippines. First-run movies of Warner Bros., First National Pictures, Columbia Pictures, United Artists Corp., and R.K.O. Radio Pictures, Inc. were also shown. At one point, the building housed a hotel and also served as office space. . The Avenue Theater, along with the Grand, State, Gaeity, Reno, and Rialto Theaters were owned by the Rufino family. In 2006, it was demolished to make way for a parking lot, as realty costs were too expensive for it to be maintained. As of 2013, this site was occupied by a branch of Padi's Point restaurant, and behind it is a parking lot. The restaurant has since been demolished, and now the site is being redeveloped.

=== Bellevue Theater ===
The Bellevue Theater is one of a few Philippine theaters built in the 1930s. It is located on Pedro Gil Street (formerly Herran), in Paco district and had a total seating capacity of six hundred. The building features a Neo-Mudéjar theme, and contains a quonset hut design, and other classic ornamentation. The theater is not currently operational and a general merchandise store occupies its first floor. As of 2013, the building was occupied by Novo Jeans and T-shirt, though a Super 8 Grocery Warehouse, has since moved into the building.

The interior is completely gutted, with almost no traces of the original auditorium left, inside the building.

=== Benper Theater ===
This 1960s style building on Fernando Poe Jr. Avenue in Quezon City has Art Deco features. The structure and cinema was originally owned by the Ang family, one of the first Filipino-Chinese clans in San Francisco del Monte, Quezon City. "Benper" came from the late couple's combined name - Benito Ang and his spouse Peregrina Dela Rosa.

=== Capitol Theater ===
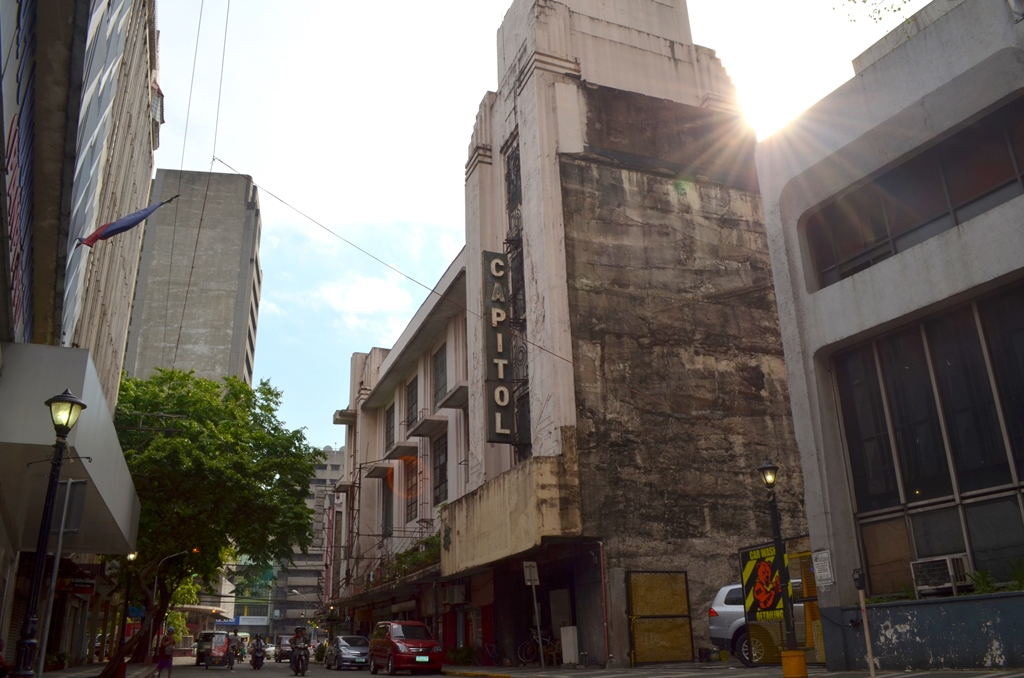
Capitol Theater – Street View

Situated on Escolta Street in Binondo, the Capitol Theater which was managed by members of the Tuason business family, was designed by Juan Nakpil and was inaugurated in January 1935. With the strong presence of symmetry, geometric shapes, and the occasional presence of graceful curves, the design is strongly identified with the Art Deco visual arts design style which was very popular during the 1930s. On 11 February 1942 it was one of six first-class movie theaters in Greater Manila which reopened after the Japanese invaded the city. The others were the Lyric, also on Escolta, the Avenue, the Ideal, and the State on Rizal Avenue, as well as the Times on Quezon Boulevard. It was renamed Daitoa Gekijo on 15 July 1944, and after the Americans returned the following year, the theater became a social hall and the building also housed the Silver Slipper, a nightclub popular among Americans.

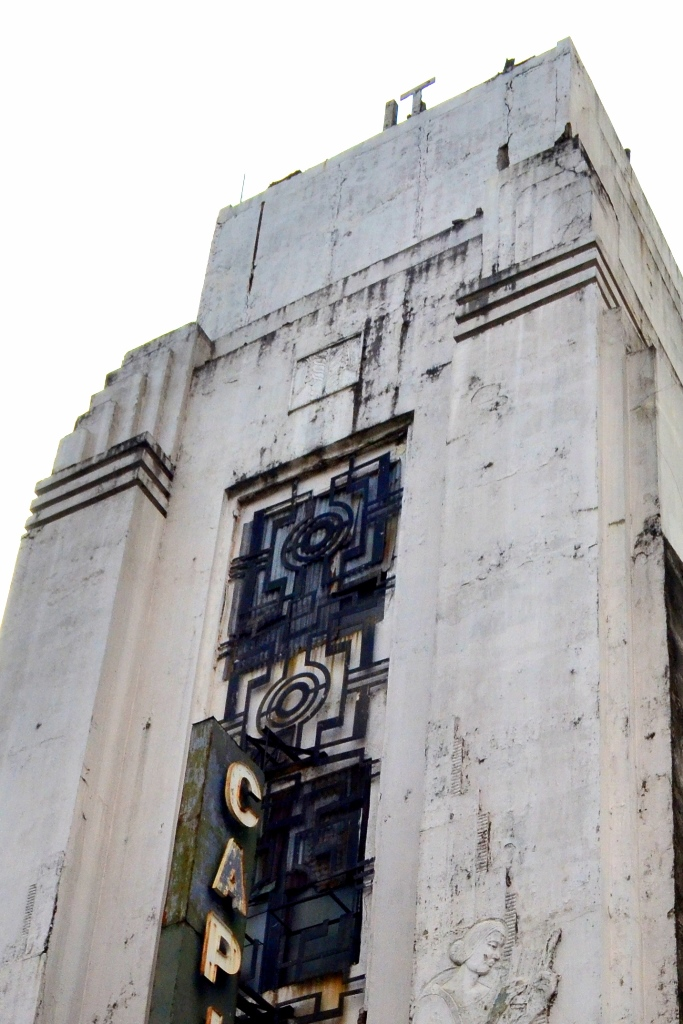
Capitol Theater – Facade – Top Details

==== Façade ====
The most prominent elements of the façade are the reliefs of two Filipina muses done by Francesco Ricardo Monti. Symmetrically installed, the two Filipina muses are explicitly portrayed in native garb or traje de mestizas, evoking contrast between their rural representation and urbanized location. Further contrast can be found in the details of their skirts, where strong lines and soft curves are juxtaposed to depict the pleats of their terno. Both muses carry symbols strongly associated with the performing arts – the left muse carries a mask [associated with theater arts], while the right muse carries a lyre [associated with music].

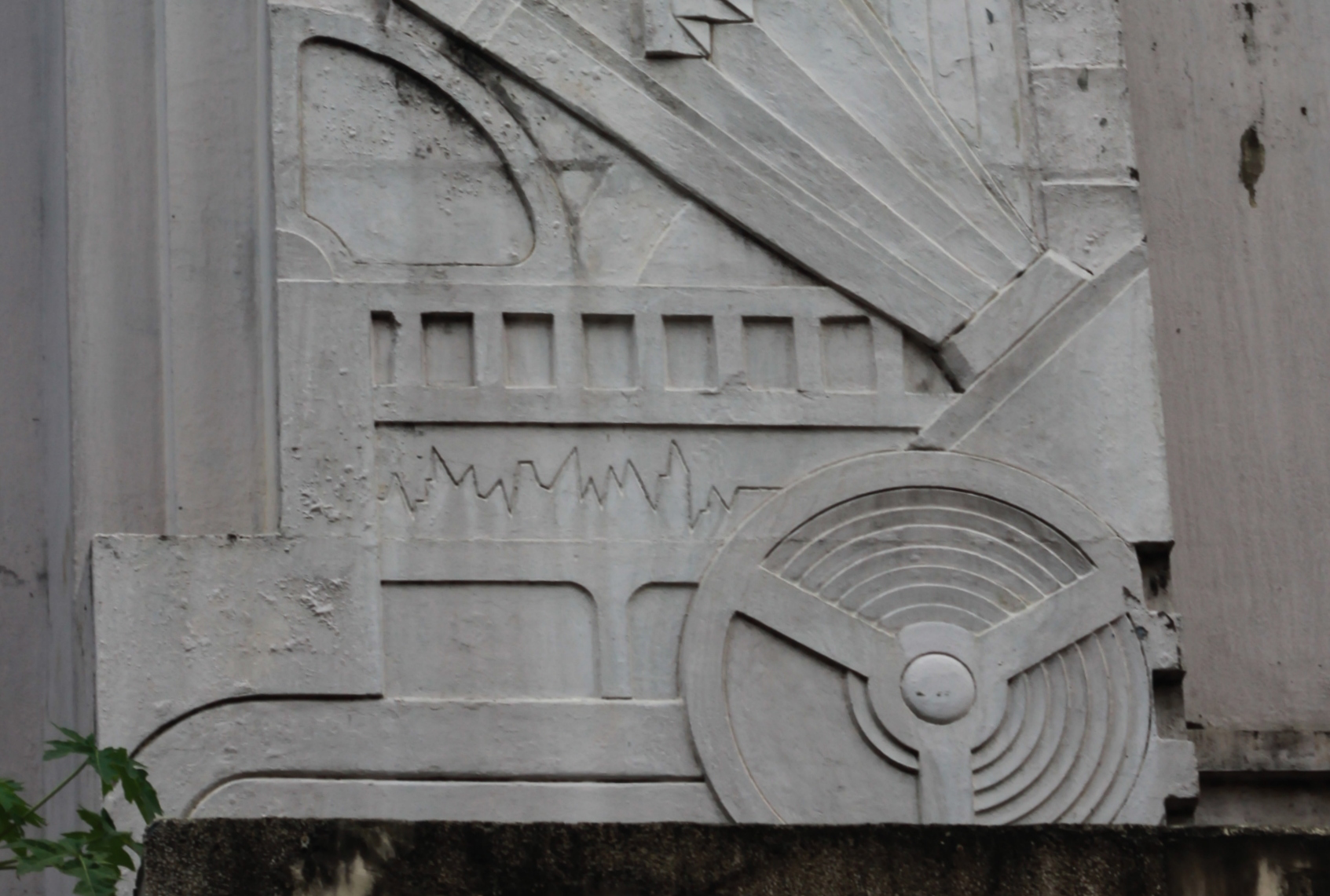
Capitol Theater – Facade – Film Reel Elements

The bottom of both reliefs are images of film and film reels, likewise executed symmetrically. The presence of these elements are in line with the establishment's purpose as a cinema, and consistent with the Art Deco style which heavily favors bold geometric shapes. Concrete letters spelling the word “Capitol”, once adorned the top of the structure, but only the letters I and T are left. Additional Art Deco elements can be found in the strong geometric details of the top corners and the central iron grills which marries both straight and curved lines.

==== Interiors ====
The double-balcony theatre had a total of 800 seats and was among Manila's air-conditioned theaters. Its lobby was adorned with a mural called “Rising Philippines” created by Victorio C. Edades, Carlos V. Francisco, and Galo B. Ocampo.

==== Damage and Decay ====
It was ultimately the deterioration of the theatre business in Manila that led to the stoppage of Capitol Theater's operations as a cinema. The construction of the Manila LRT Line 1 and the extensive delays prompted movie goers to prefer newly opened air–conditioned malls with newer cinemas. As of June 2020, most of the theater has been demolished, with only the facade intact.

=== Cine Concepcion ===
This movie house was located in Malabon.

=== Cine Oro ===
This movie house was located at Plaza Santa Cruz.(see nineteenth photo). Various photos show that the Cinema was also called the Radio in the thirties, the Astor after the Pacific War, and the Savoy in the sixties.

=== Ever Theater ===
The Ever Theater is located along Rizal Avenue in Santa Cruz district. The theater was also designed by Juan Nakpil and has a single screen cinema with an 800 seating capacity. It was also visited by Walter Gropius during its inauguration in the 1950s, praising the theater's outstanding qualities. Currently closed as a theater, it now serves the public as a commercial arcade. As of 2013, this site is occupied by Astrotel, a hotel.

=== Gaiety Theater ===
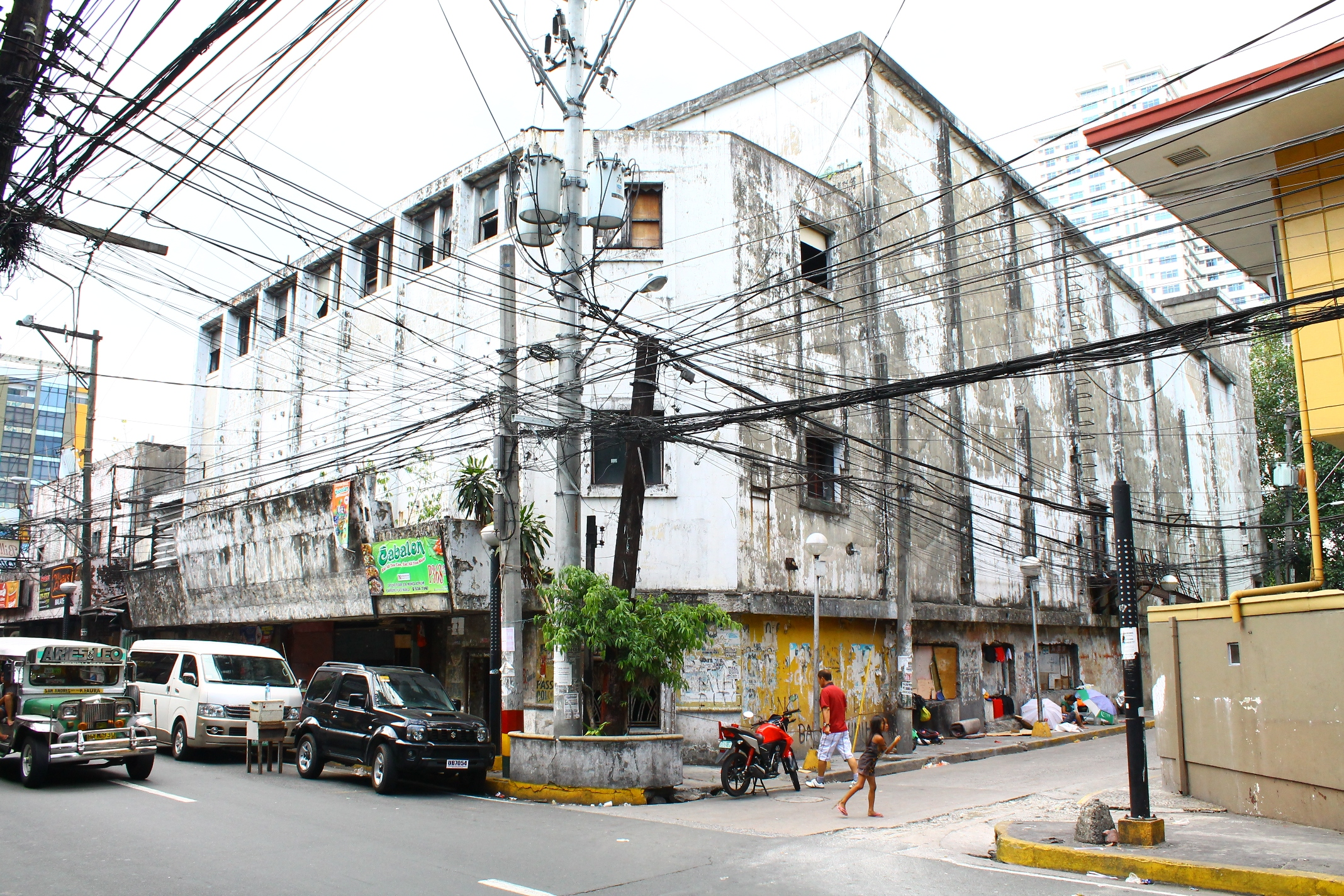
Gaiety Theater

The Gaiety Theater was located on Del Pilar Street in the Ermita district in the city of Manila. It was designed in 1935 by Juan Nakpil. As of 2014, it is dilapidated with several families living inside as caretakers. It was demolished in 2016.

=== Grand Theater ===
This movie house was on Rizal Avenue.

=== Ideal Theater ===
The Ideal Theater was located at Rizal Avenue corner Carriedo Street, Santa Cruz district and designed by the late architect Pablo S. Antonio Sr. in 1933, the theater was exclusively showing Metro-Goldwyn-Mayer (MGM) films in the Philippines. The theater was demolished in the late 1970s to give way to the construction of a department store now present site of Philtrust Bank Carriedo Branch. The Ideal Theater in 1933, in front Capitan Luis Gonzaga Bldg in 1953 was one of the first major works of Pablo Antonio along with the Nicanor B. Reyes Sr. Hall main buildings in 1939 of Far Eastern University and Manila Polo Club.

=== Joy Theater ===
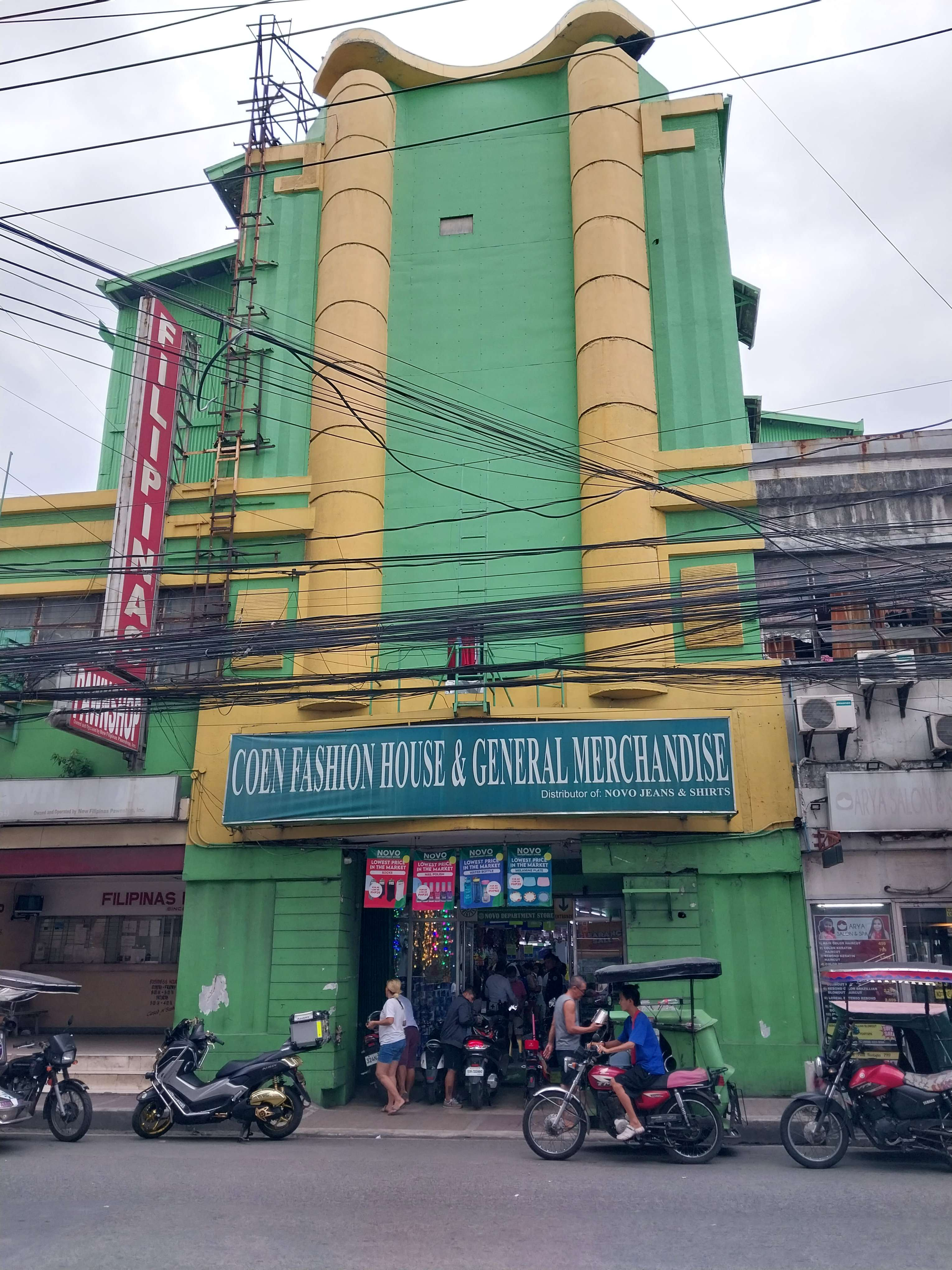
Facade of the former Joy Theater.

The Joy Theater, built in 1939, is located at 187 Antonio S Arnaiz Avenue, in Libertad, Pasay. It has since been closed and converted to a Novo Department Store, and was recently painted bright green and yellow.

The auditorium's ground floor section has been gutted, and incorporated into the store, with a false ceiling installed. The rest of the theater is intact but off limits, behind a staff-only staircase.

=== Lion Theater ===
This movie house was located at the corner of J. P. Rizal and W. Paz Streets in Marikina, and has since been replaced by an open car park.

=== Lyric Theater ===
This movie house, which was originally built in 1911, was located at 81 Escolta Street, Binondo. An American, Frank Goulette, acquired this theater in 1916 and reopened it in 1917. In 1929 it was a 1,400-seat theater, with no air conditioning, and was considered to be the only first-class movie house in town. This Deco version of the theater had been designed by Fernando De la Cantera. It was reconstructed again as a Streamline Moderne building with the largest air-conditioning installation among Manila theaters, by Pablo Antonio and reopened on 1 June 1937, and was exclusively showing Warner Bros. films. Like the Capitol Theater it was considered to be a movie palace. In 1939, the Lyric was one of six movie houses in Manila which were considered to be "the most presentable and modernized sort," each of which seated about 1,200 patrons.

=== Morosi Theater ===
This Italian-named theater on Taft Avenue in Pasay was demolished in 2016.

=== Radio Theater ===
In August 1929 this movie house was the first to show a sound film in the Philippines, which was the American movie Syncopation.

=== Rex Theater ===
This movie house was located on Salazar Street, Binondo. The theater is now home to the President Grand Palace restaurant.

=== Scala Theater ===
Another theater designed by Pablo Antonio was the Scala Theatre, also on Avenida Rizal in Santa Cruz. With its floors paced with tea rose marble and its curved wall lined with glass blocks, the theater's magnificence did not last: it was closed in the 1990s. The theater catered to up to 600 people for its single screen operations. As of 2013, the theater is now closed though the building structures still remain, albeit in a dire condition.

=== State Theater ===
Another work of the late architect Juan Nakpil, the State Theater was on Rizal Avenue, Santa Cruz. Inaugurated in 1935, the theater was eventually closed in the 1990s, and was demolished in 2001. As of 2013, this site is occupied by shops and retail outlet.

=== Times Theater ===
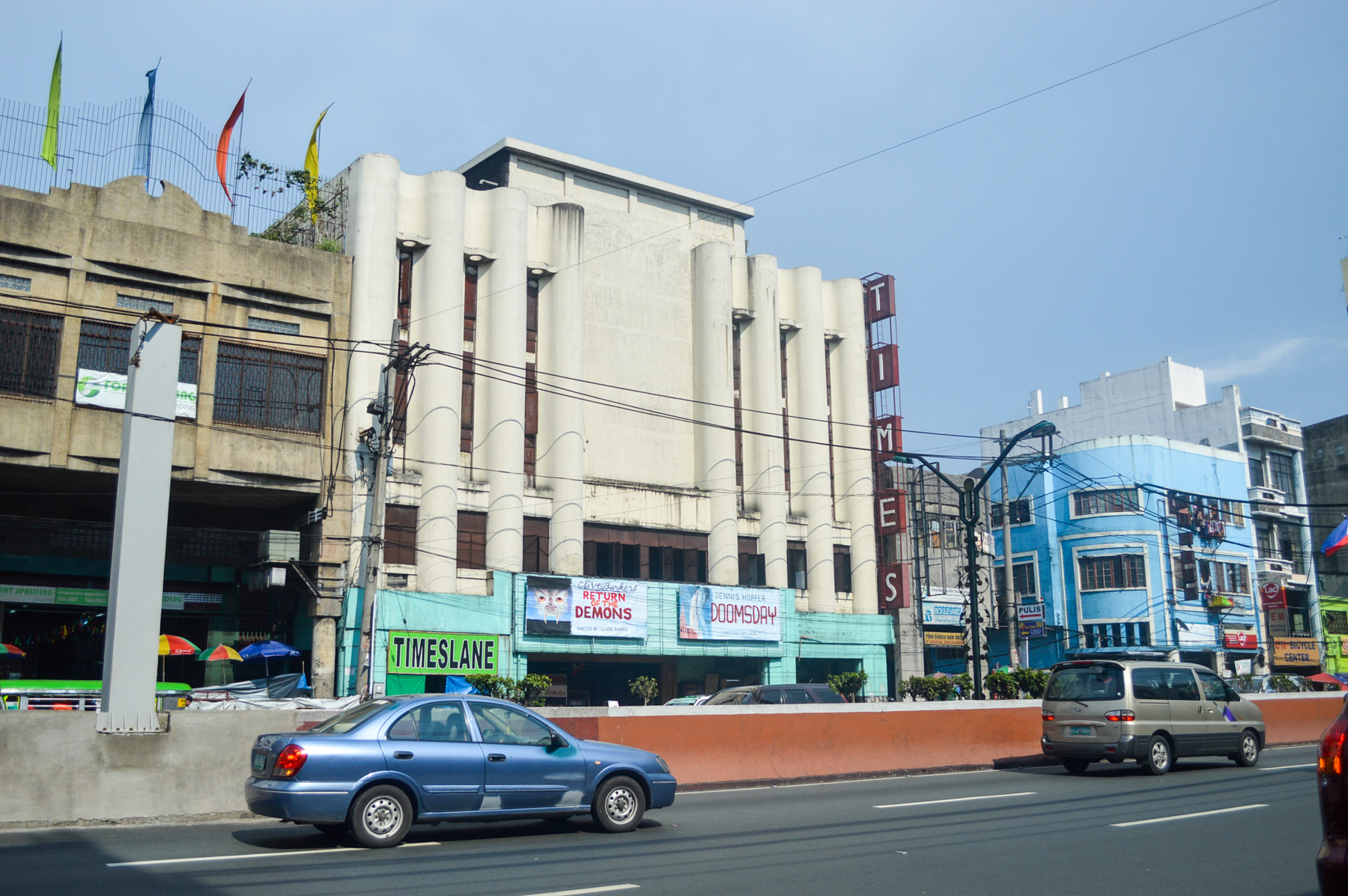
Times Theater

The Times Theater at 480 Quezon Boulevard, near corner A. Barbosa Street, Quiapo, was designed by the architect Luis Z. Araneta with an Art Moderne façade. Construction began in 1939, and it opened on 20 February 1941 with pomp and circumstance, with prominent figures present such as Vice-President and Mrs. Sergio Osmeña and Mr. and Mrs. Carlos P. Romulo. The theater was notable for having introduced black light for decorative effect, and it was also the first to use ozone to purify and deodorize the venue. The theater also made Philippine cinematic history when it introduced the two-way overseas hook-up between Manila and Hollywood, with Deanna Durbin at the other end. Miss Durbin starred in the first film showed at the Times, It Started with Eve. It made history again when it became the first movie theater to open after the Battle of Manila. Unmaintained today, the theater is still operational, and can accommodate 800 people with its single screen operations.

=== Tivoli Theater ===
This movie house was located at Plaza Santa Cruz.

== See also ==
- Architecture of the Philippines
- Cinema of the Philippines
- List of theaters and concert halls in Metro Manila
