= Brigida Perez Villanueva =

Brigida Perez Villanueva was first female film director in the Philippines. Nothing is known about her life. She directed and produced the silent film Pendulum of Fate (1933) under her Villanueva Productions, featuring a cast of unknown actors. Pendulum of Fate, the last Filipino silent film, premiered at the Tivoli Theatre on March 17, 1933, and was a box office failure.
