= St. La Salle Hall =

Four-story Neoclassical building in Manila, Philippines

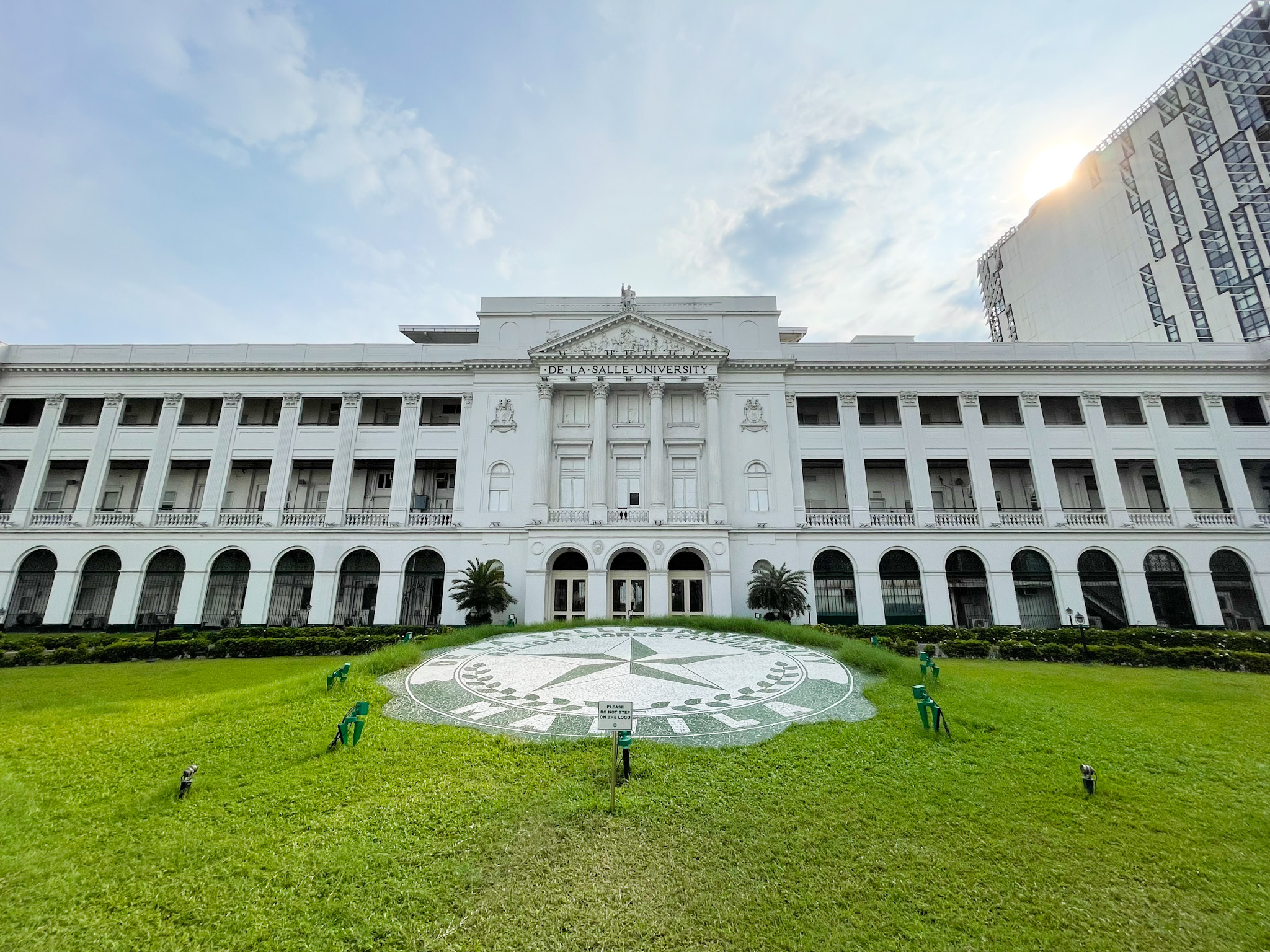
- The building's facade pictured in 2025
- Interactive map of the St. La Salle Hall area

General information
- Type: Classroom, office, chapel and convent space
- Architectural style: Neoclassical
- Location: De La Salle University, 2401 Taft Avenue; Malate, Manila, Philippines
- Coordinates: 14°33′51.5″N 120°59′37.5″E
- Named for: St. Jean-Baptiste de La Salle
- Groundbreaking: 1920
- Completed: 1924
- Renovated: 1948

Design and construction
- Architect: Tomás Mapúa

St. La Salle Hall is an H-shaped four-story academic building built in the Neoclassical style in the Philippines. It was built from 1920 to 1924 to serve as the new campus of De La Salle College (now De La Salle University) due to a lack of space in the previous campus in Paco, Manila, and to accommodate its increasing student population. It served as the grade school and high school building back from when the college was still offering those levels.

Originally built as a three-story structure, a fourth level was added in the 1990s for the residence of the De La Salle Brothers. The ground floor houses the College of Business and the Pearl of Great Price Chapel. Meanwhile, the second floor of the St. La Salle Hall houses the School of Economics and the Chapel of the Most Blessed Sacrament. Aside from classrooms, it also houses several offices of the university and laboratories.

The structure was severely damaged during the liberation of Manila in World War II. Numerous civilians took refuge in the building for protection. Restoration of the building after the war took two years and cost ₱246,883 (US$5,720).

The LaSallian, the official student newspaper of the university, identifies it as "DLSU's most historic building." It is the only Philippine structure featured in the book 1001 Buildings You Must See Before You Die: The World’s Architectural Masterpieces, published by Quintessence Editions Ltd. in 2007.

== History ==
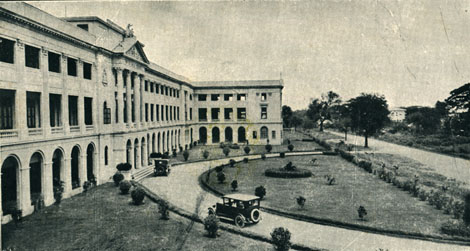
St. La Salle Hall ca. 1924

=== Selection of the site ===
Due to the lack of space in the campus at Paco, the transfer of De La Salle College to Taft Avenue was decided. The new 30,300-square-meter (326,000 sq ft) site in Malate, worth ₱55,500 (US$1,270), was acquired through a ₱45,500 (US$1,050) loan. The estimated cost of the construction of building in the site was ₱200,000 (US$46,400). The reason for the selection of the site was the close proximity of St. Scholastica's College, a girls' school located about 200 meters (660 ft) from the new campus. The two schools, one for boys and one for girls, would allow parents to send their children to a single area. Another reason for the selection was its close location to a streetcar station of the Manila Electric Railroad And Light Company allowing quick transport for the students.

Opposition to constructing the college at the new site came from certain American parties who had financial stakes in the properties that were supposed to be developed under the municipal planning scheme for the area. Another problem, concerning the Bronan Plan, arose regarding the site. According to the plan, Taft Avenue would be further extended, in line with identifying the roads leading from Manila to Pasay. If a building were built on the site, it would block the planned extension of Taft Avenue. Brother Acisclus Michael, a Lasallian brother, appealed directly to Governor General Francis Burton Harrison, and expressed that a college ought to be constructed in the area. Harrison failed to get the approval of the municipal board, however. The building plan was only pushed through a year later when the composition of the board changed. In order to get approval, the Brothers themselves took the initiative to donate a piece of the property on the other end of Taft Avenue.

=== Construction ===
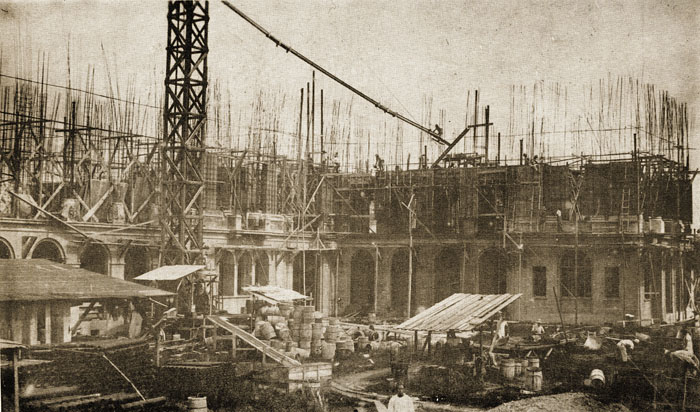
Construction of St. La Salle Hall ca. 1921

In 1916, a competition was held to determine the design of the building. Cornell University alumnus Tomás Mapúa, the first Filipino registered architect and subsequent founder of the Mapúa Institute of Technology (now Mapúa University), won the competition against 9 other architects, and was awarded ₱5,000 (US$116).

The cornerstone was laid by Manila Archbishop Michael J. O'Doherty on March 19, 1920. On the same day, the Paco site was sold under the condition that the school is allowed to continue operation for 18 months before completely moving to the Taft campus. An amount of ₱260,000 (US$6,020) was spent on the first phase of the construction that took half a year. Classes on the new campus formally started on October 3, 1921. On February 22, 1922, only the first floor and half of the second floor were finished while the rest of the building was still uncompleted due to exhaustion of funds. The building was finally completed on December 15, 1924. Meanwhile, the chapel was completed on November 17, 1939, and was dedicated to Saint Joseph.

=== World War II ===
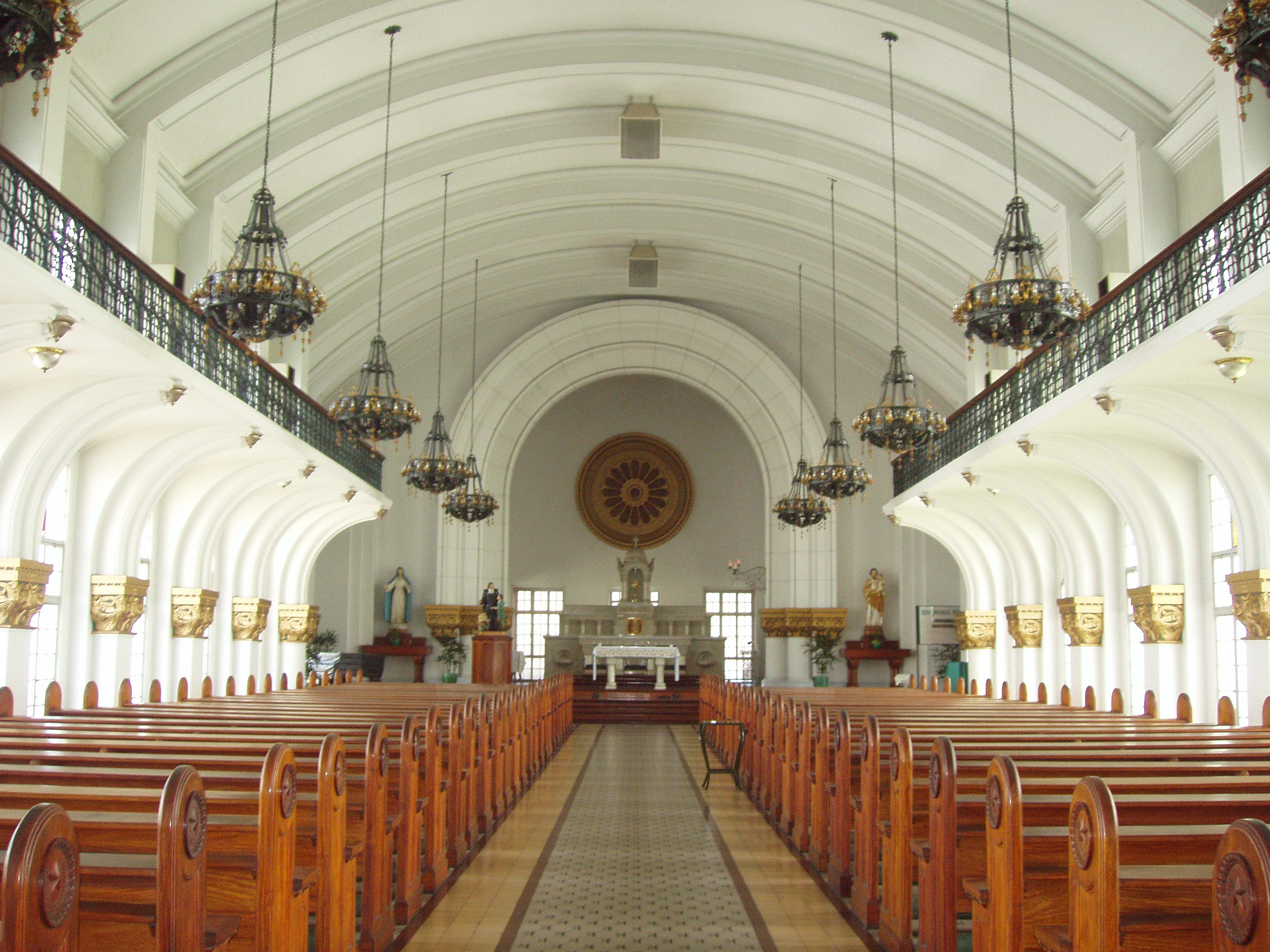
The Chapel of the Most Blessed Sacrament on the southwestern wing of St. La Salle Hall

The building sustained heavy damages during World War II. Numerous civilians took refuge in the building for protection. It was under shell fire for almost a week. Japanese forces took possession of the building, and transformed it into a headquarters. Sixteen Brothers and 25 other civilians were massacred by Japanese troops inside the school chapel on February 12, 1945.

Reconstruction of the building was made from September 1946 to December 31, 1948, at the cost of ₱246,883 (US$5,710). Permission was received from Archbishop O'Doherty in December 1946 to have the chapel re-dedicated to the Most Blessed Sacrament. The chapel was blessed a year later.

=== 21st century ===
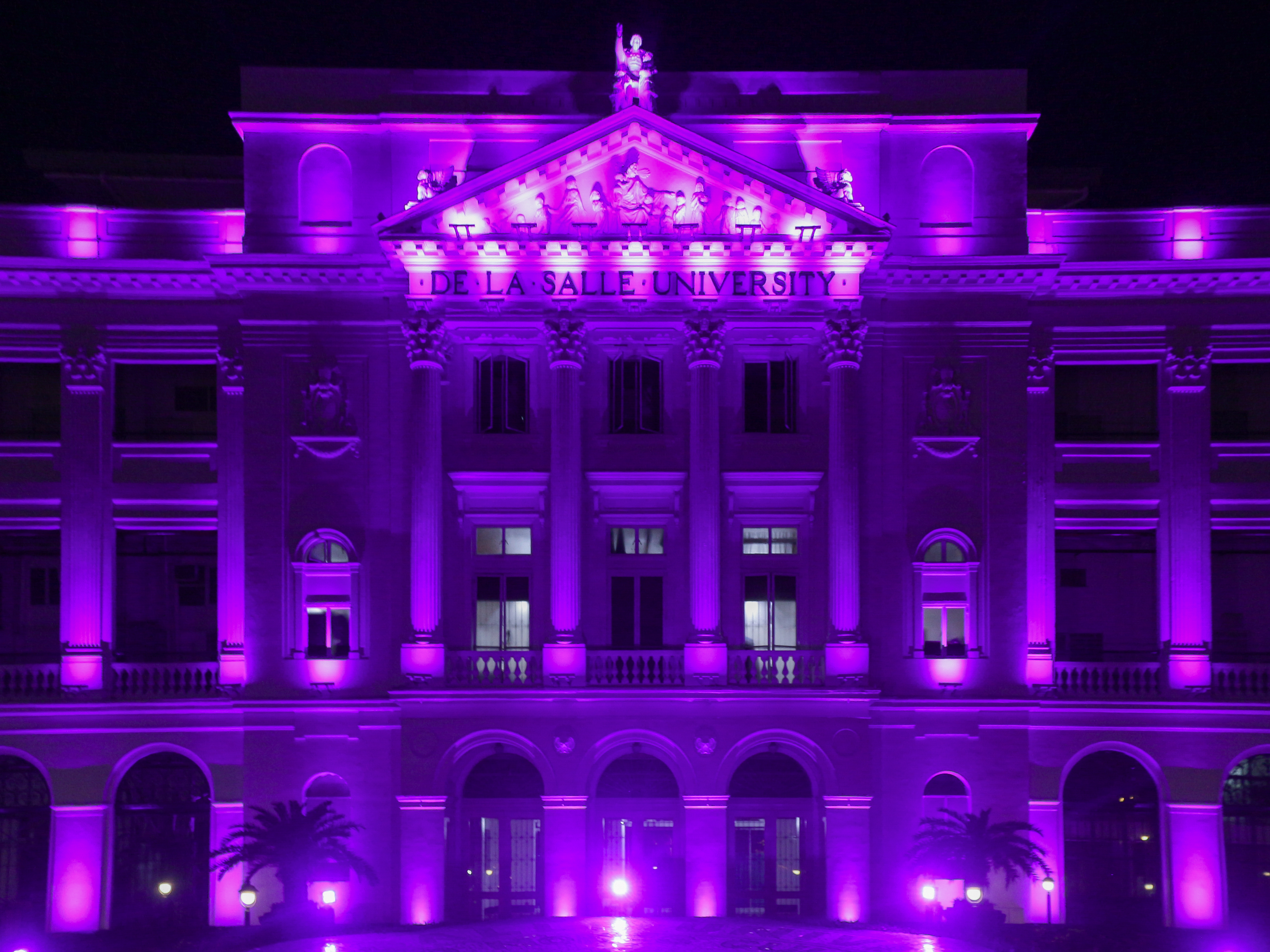
The facade was lit in purple on International Women's Day in 2024.

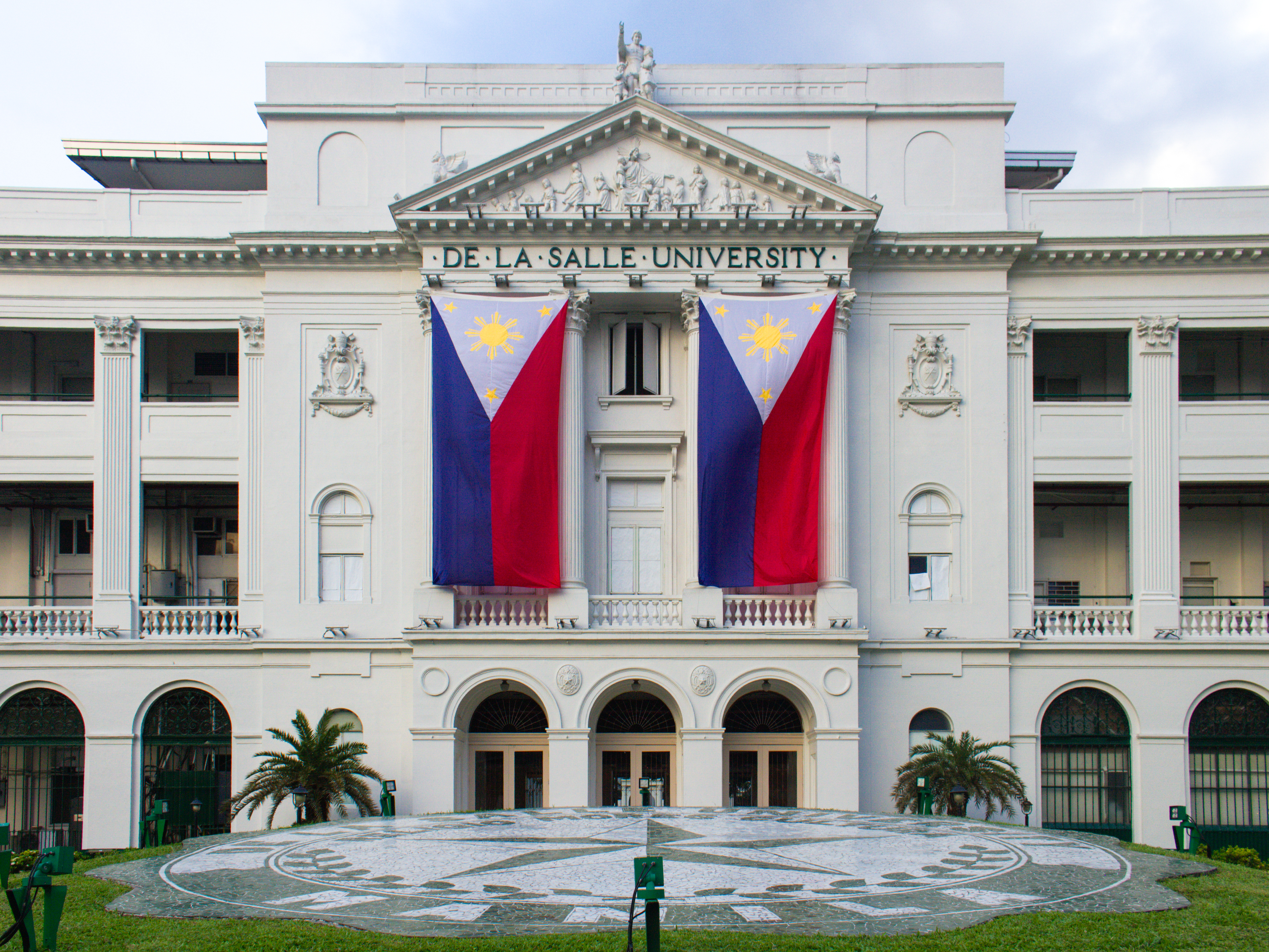
Philippine flags adorned the facade from National Flag Day until Independence Day in 2024.

Retrofitting of the building started in January 2011, and was completed by 2012. In September 2024, the building was declared an important cultural property by the National Museum of the Philippines. The facade is equipped with colored lighting and a projection system, which De La Salle University uses to highlight events, commemorations, holidays, and advocacies throughout the year.

== Architectural details ==
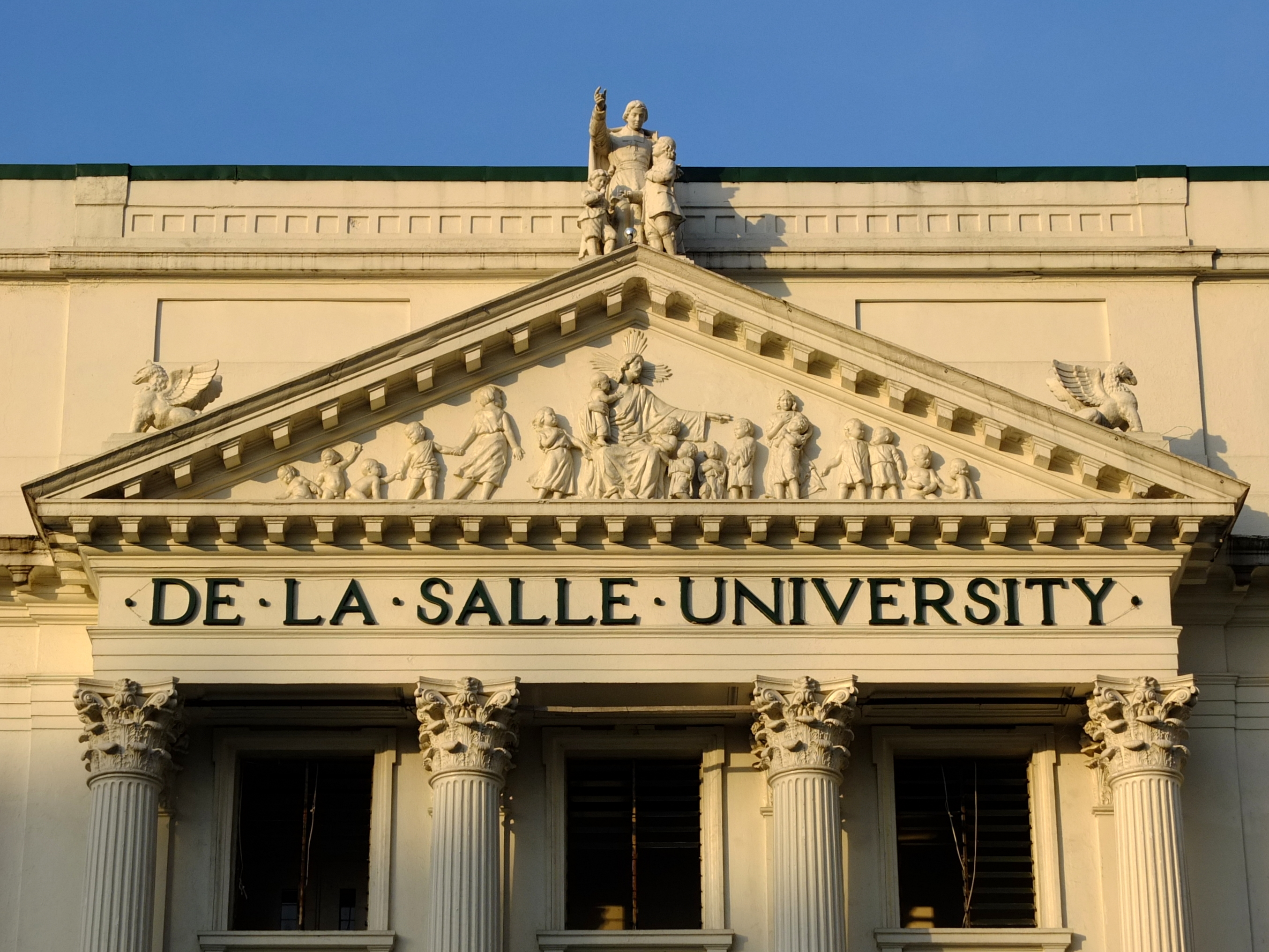
Central pediment of the St. La Salle Hall façade

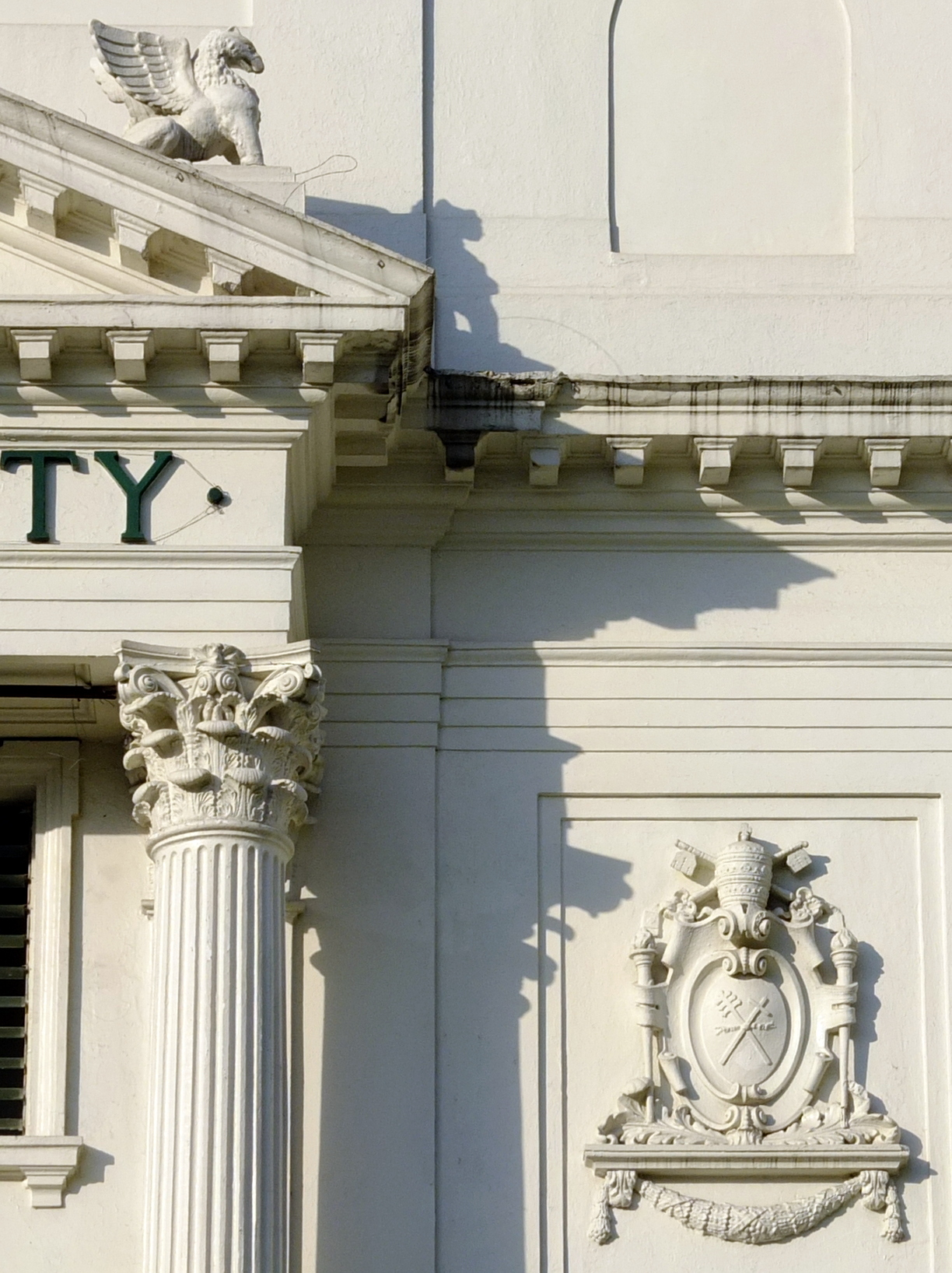
Closer look at the details of the façade

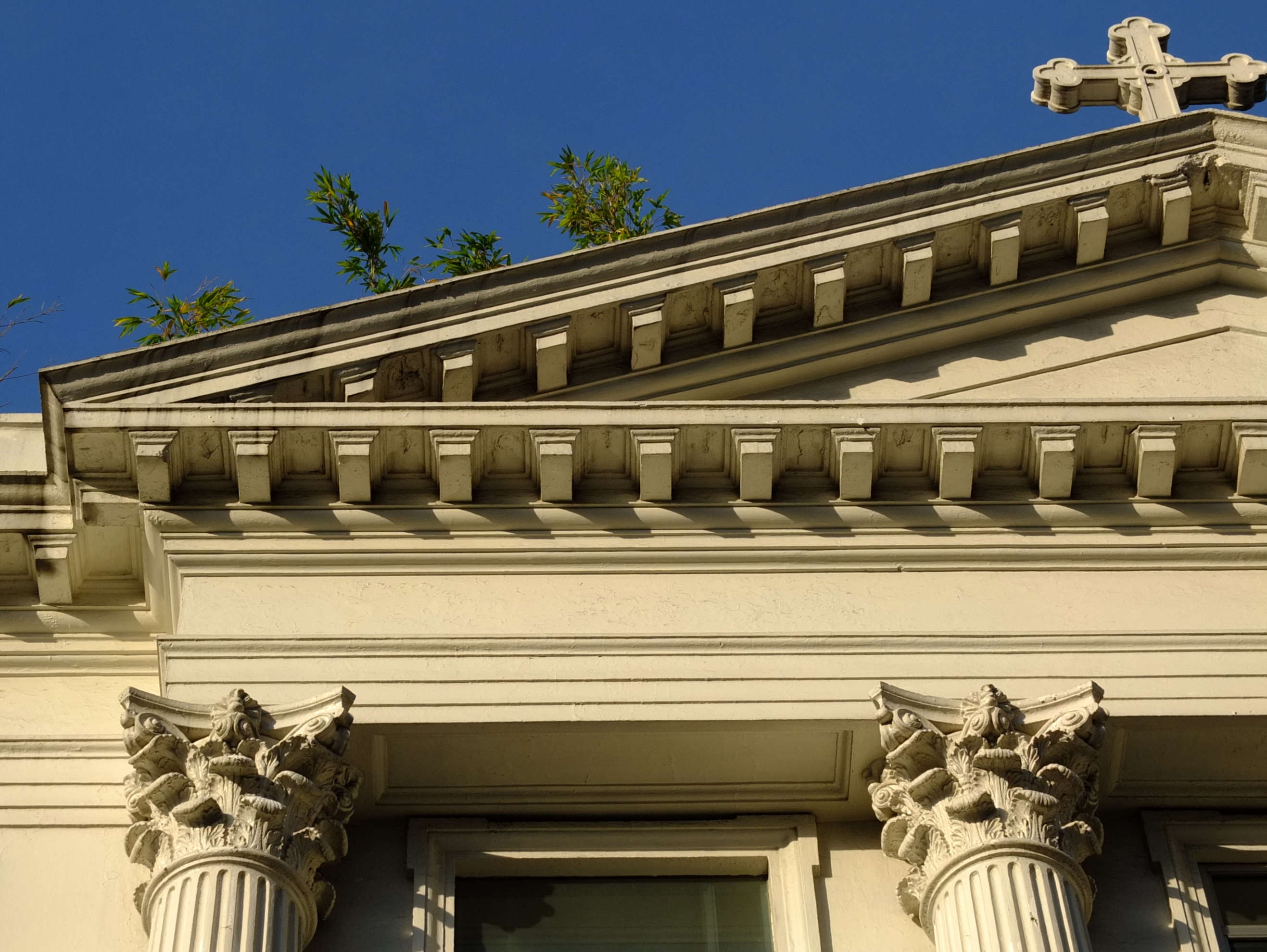
A close-up of the left corner of the pediment of the façade

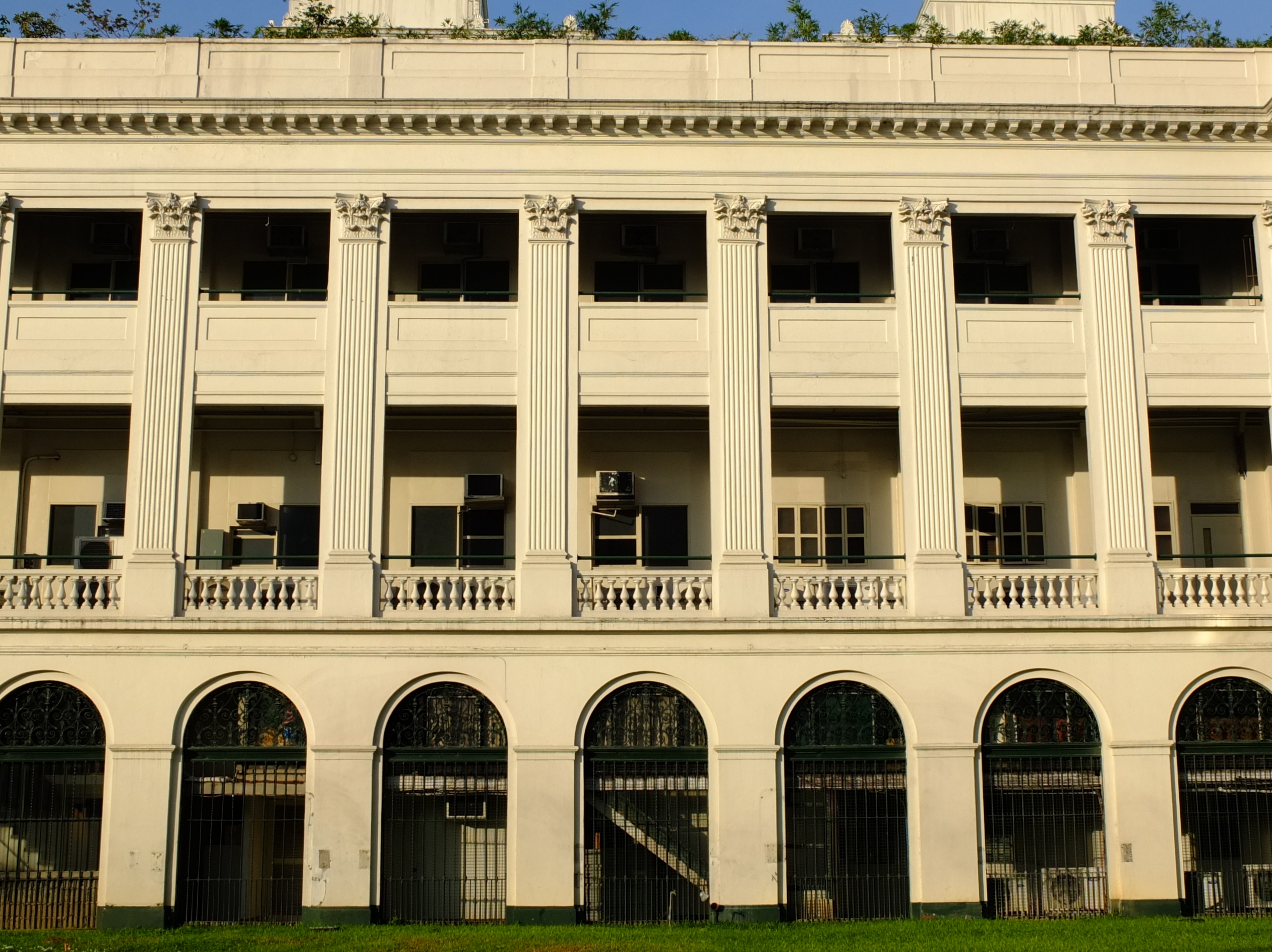
Arcade and Corinthian pilasters of St. La Salle Hall
