= Anabel Bosch =

Filipina musician

- Born: Ana Isabel Ramirez-Bosch; January 25, 1976; Manila, Philippines
- Died: January 10, 2009 (aged 32); Manila, Philippines
- Occupations: singer, poet
- Known for: former vocalist of Tropical Depression
- Spouse: Jamie Wilson (estranged)

Ana Isabel "Anabel" Ramirez Bosch (January 25, 1976 – January 10, 2009) was a Filipina singer and poet who fronted several important Filipino rock bands.

Bosch's singing career started when she was in high school, when she became a regular at Club Dredd in Quezon City. She soon became a singer for Tropical Depression, a popular Filipino rock band in the late 1990s. She also sang for the rock bands Elektrikoolaid, Spy and Analog.

She was a member of the women's poetry movement "Romancing Venus", founded 2006 by Kooky Tuason, which spawned a spoken-word album and book.

Bosch was stricken with a brain aneurysm on New Year's Day 2009, and lapsed into unconsciousness. Her friends in the Filipino musical community staged various gigs and fundraising efforts to shoulder her medical expenses. She died on January 10, 2009.

Bosch was estranged from her husband, the stage and film actor Jamie Wilson. She has a daughter, Mishaela, from a previous relationship.
