= Shibby de Guzman =

Filipina youth activist

- Born: Shibby Lapeña de Guzman; 2002 or 2003 (age 22–23)
- Education: St. Scholastica's College
- Occupation: Student
- Known for: Youth activism

Shibby Lapeña de Guzman (born c. 2002 or 2003) is a Filipina youth activist. She is best known for her protests against the burial of Philippine President Ferdinand Marcos at the Libingan ng mga Bayani and against extrajudicial killings amid the anti-drug campaign of Philippine President Rodrigo Duterte. She was named as one of the thirty most influential teenagers of 2017 by Time magazine.

== Biography ==
Shibby de Guzman was born in the early 2000s. She rose to prominence as a high school student at Saint Scholastica's College (SSC) in Manila. At age 13, she started her activism with the consent of her mother, Melay Lapeña. When participating in protests, she is usually seen wearing a cardboard with a Tagalog text saying "Lahat tayo posibleng drug pusher" (We can all possibly be drug pushers). It is her version of the "cardboard justice", a term that was coined by Hope Swann, a professor from De La Salle University. Aside from being an activist, she is a member of a club for the arts at her school.

== Activism ==
In November 2016, de Guzman led her fellow students at SSC to protest the decision of the Supreme Court of the Philippines on maintaining the order of President Rodrigo Duterte to allow the state burial of former President Ferdinand Marcos. During the protests, her school journal, The Benildean, photographed her holding a megaphone along with her schoolmates and when the picture was posted on social media, it went viral. At that time, she was just a thirteen year old ninth-grader and many criticized her and the other youthful protesters for being too young in joining a political rally and for being brainwashed and abused by her school. Mocha Uson, a Filipina celebrity and staunch supporter of Duterte, said in a Facebook post that it is unnecessary to include children in protests and they can be patriotic when they are taught about history in school. Some of the netizens who commented on her posts opined that SSC is doing child abuse for permitting students at the demonstration. De Guzman countered that they, the young protesters, fully understand what they protesting against. According to Melay Lapeña, the mother of de Guzman, SSC did not required the students to attend the protests after the school released a memo to parents requesting them to permit their children to take part in a noise barrage protest. Lapeña also added that she gave her permission for the participation of de Guzman at the protests because it is her right. SSC alumnae also reacted to the criticisms regarding children participating in protests and said that it was those who have attacked those young protesters through threats, harassment and hurtful comments, and cyberbullying are the ones who are perpetrating child abuse. They were considering legal action against those alleged attackers.

In July 2017, de Guzman joined another protest rally ahead of the State of the Nation Address of Philippine President Rodrigo Duterte at the Congress of the Philippines. This time, she objected the extrajudicial killings occurring amid the campaign of President Duterte against illegal drugs and protested against the violation of civil liberties. She made a speech during the protests and said that they stand against the supposed authoritarianism and emerging dictatorship.

== Recognition ==
In 2017, de Guzman was listed by Time magazine as one of thirty most influential teenagers. De Guzman downplayed the recognition and said that there are other people who deserve the accolade more. Senator Leila de Lima, a known critic of Duterte, lauded the inclusion of de Guzman in the list of Time and said that de Guzman served as an inspiration for Filipinos and noted that she is aware of the social issues considering that she is just a school girl. SSC vice principal Jonna Lim also commented on the recognition and said that de Guzman served as a reminder to everyone in educating the youth on social justice.
