= Chapel of the Most Blessed Sacrament =

Roman Catholic church in Manila, Philippines

- MBS Chapel
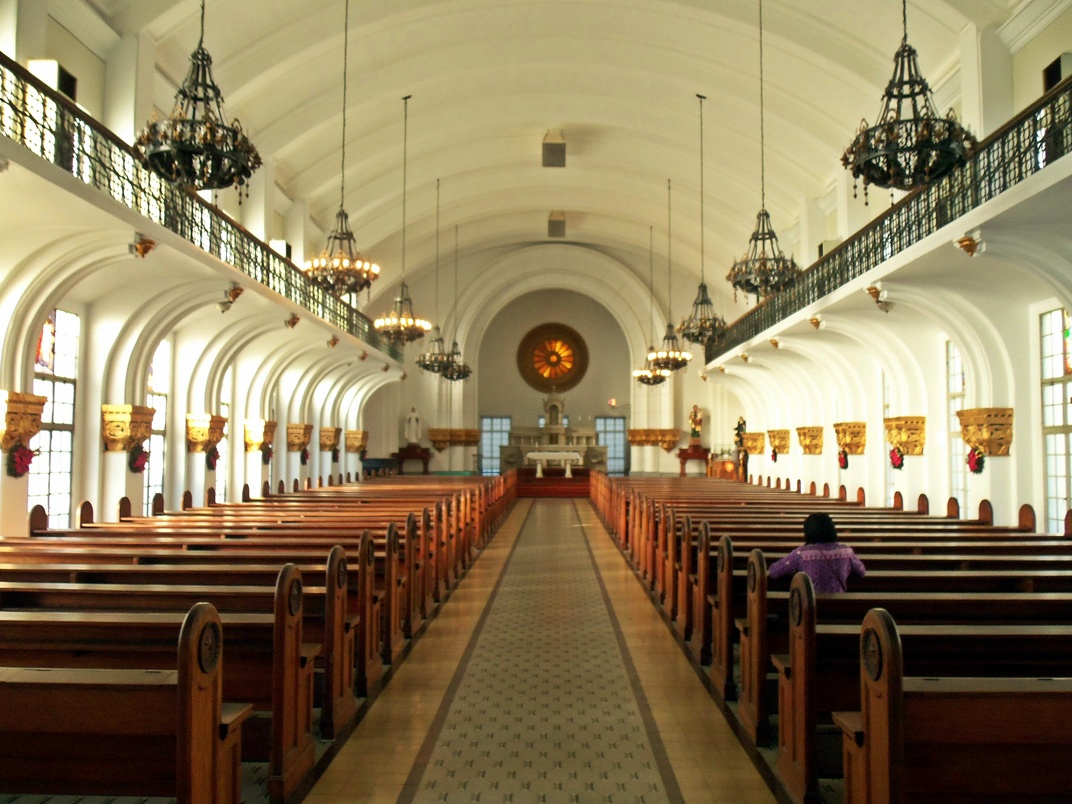
- Chapel interior in 2012
- Chapel of the Most Blessed Sacrament
- 14°33′50″N 120°59′38″E
- Location: St. La Salle Hall, De La Salle University, 2401 Taft Avenue, Malate, Manila
- Country: Philippines
- Denomination: Roman Catholic

History
- Dedication: Saint Joseph
- Dedicated: November 17, 1939

Architecture
- Functional status: Active
- Architect: Tomás Mapúa
- Architectural type: Chapel
- Style: Art deco
- Completed: November 17, 1939

Administration
- Archdiocese: Manila
- Parish: Our Lady of Assumption

The Chapel of the Most Blessed Sacrament (Building code: MBS; also known as MBS Chapel) is the main and largest chapel of De La Salle University in Manila, Philippines. It is located on the second floor of the southernmost wing of the St. La Salle Hall, the oldest building of the university. The chapel was designed in Art Deco style by the commissioned architect, Tomás Mapúa. Built in the 1930s, the chapel pews were hewn from narra and carried the Signum Fidei Star, the sign of faith and the symbol of the De La Salle Brothers.

On February 12, 1945, during the liberation of Manila at the peak of World War II, retreating Japanese troops massacred at least 60 civilians inside the chapel as they sought refuge from the ongoing battle, believing that the building's thick walls would protect them from anything but a direct hit.

On December 2, 2014, the 75th year jubilee of the Chapel of the Most Blessed Sacrament was celebrated, with a Mass presided by a De La Salle University alumnus, Rev. Fr. Benildus Maramba, OSB.

== History ==
=== Construction ===
Even before De La Salle College moved to its present location at Taft Avenue in Malate, Manila, the school already had its own chapel. Its first chapel was opened on March 19, 1912, a year after the school opened its doors to 100 students in Calle Nozaleda, Paco, Manila. When the school transferred to Taft Avenue, it needed to build a new chapel. On March 22, 1926, Br. Basilian and Br. Anthony were sent to Iloilo, Cebu, and Mindanao to solicit funds for the construction of the new chapel. On November 17, 1939, the chapel was completed and dedicated to Saint Joseph. President Manuel L. Quezon and his wife Aurora Quezon attended this occasion.

=== The February 12, 1945, Massacre ===
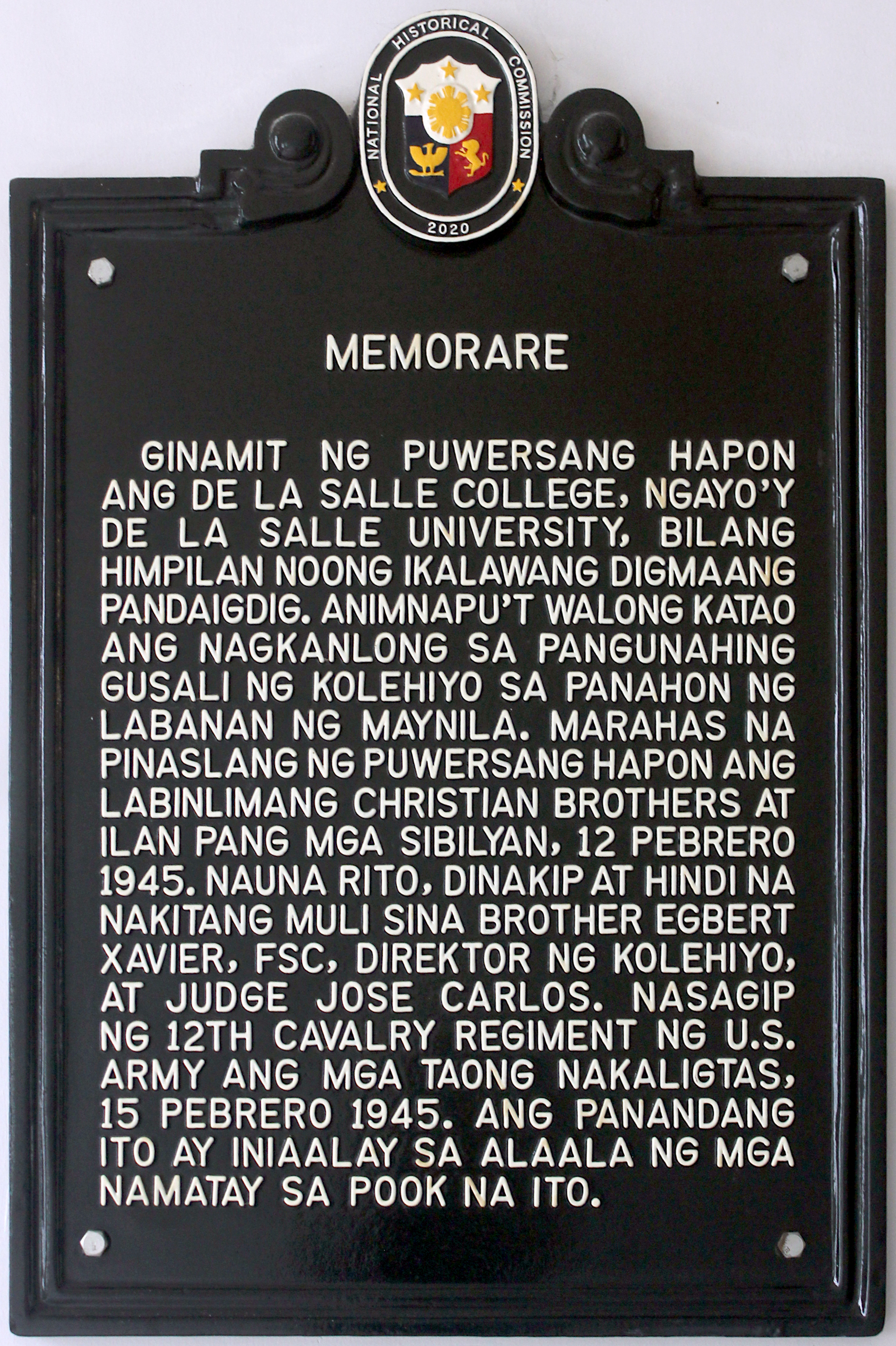
Chapel NHCP historical marker installed in 2020

On February 12, 1945, a Japanese military officer along with 20 soldiers forcibly made their way into the college, which was then a refuge for 70 people, including 30 women and young girls, 16 Christian Brothers and the college's chaplain-Redemptorist Father Cosgrave CSSR, and the adult men of two families. The then De La Salle College Director-Brother Egbert Xavier FSC was about two days earlier forcibly taken by a group of Japanese soldiers and was never seen again. The Japanese soldiers herded these people into the school chapel where they were subsequently shot, slashed, or bayoneted. Those who did not die in the attack would be later be left to bleed to death and the Japanese attempted to violate the women who were dying from their wounds. The chapel was then set on fire and only ten of the victims would survive. This event was memorialized by a historical marker installed by the National Historical Commission of the Philippines on February 12, 2020, 75 years after the Liberation of Manila and the end of the Second World War in the Philippines.

=== Post-war restoration ===
On December 16, 1946, a written permission was received from Archbishop Michael J. O'Doherty to have the reconciliation ceremony and the re-dedication of the Chapel to the Most Blessed Sacrament. On December 20, 1947, the Chapel was officially blessed. A ceremony of reparation to the Blessed Sacrament took place for the desecrations perpetrated in the chapel, and for the excesses in the name of war.

The chapel was maintained and renovated. The original panes in the glass doors were of pre-war vintage, imported, and had, over the years, been patched with varicolored substitutes. This led to a second battle cry, Relieve a Pane. Now, uniform glass adorns the Chapel's doors and has a relic of the bone of St. Jean-Baptiste de La Salle.

The De La Salle Alumni Association has donated ₱4 million for the renovation of the chapel in the year 2000. It restored the chapel to its original splendor. The stained glass stations were cleaned and polished to their original beauty. In the process, newly added stations were incorporated. The sanctuary was beautified with narra parquet extensions. The statues were restored and brought back to their original home on the small altars. The rose window above the main altar was backlit and the crucifix in the cupola was bathed in a soft halogen light.
