= Tuason =

Tuason is a surname. Notable people with the surname include:

- Andrew Tuason (born 1962), Hong Kong musician
- Kooky Tuason (fl. from 2005), Filipina spoken word artist and radio personality
- Mercedes Arrastia-Tuason (born 1930), Philippine diplomat
- Pedro Tuason (1884–1961), Filipino lawyer and government official
- Yannick Tuason (born 1989), Filipino footballer
