= Margaux Salcedo =

Margaux Salcedo is a Filipino economic analyst and media personality.

She was Undersecretary of the Department of Budget and Management in the Philippines where she was head of the Advocacy and Economic Affairs Group.. She was part of the Philippine economic team that conducted the Post-SONA Economic Briefing in 2023 and moderated the Philippine Economic Briefing in New York and other major cities around the world as well as the Philippine Economic Briefings in key cities in the Philippines.

== Education ==
Salcedo is an outstanding alumna of St. Scholastica's College High School where she later became a professor of Philippine history and communication arts. She earned her bachelor's degree in economics from De La Salle University. She has a Juris Doctor from the Ateneo Law School where she was editor of the Ateneo Law Journal.

== Career ==
Salcedo is a co-host of The Spokes, a daily political talk show hosted by former presidential spokespersons, and anchor and host of Business 360 with Margaux Salcedo, the leading business program of the Bilyonaryo News Channel.

She was a news anchor of GMA News Live and columnist of the Philippine Daily Inquirer.

She was also the presidential campaign spokesperson of former president Joseph Estrada.

== Catholic writer ==
Salcedo is the founding editor-in-chief of the faith website Dominus Est, which won the St. Pope John Paul II Award in 2023 and the Best Website Award at the Catholic Mass Media Awards in 2020, 2022, 2023 and 2024; as well as Best Vlog for the show In Depth.

== Jazz ==
Margaux Salcedo won the Aliw Award at the 26th Aliw Awards in 2013 for singing jazz at the Tap Room with the 3-time Aliw awardee and legendary jazz pianist Romy Posadas.
