= Rizal Park Open Air Auditorium =

Amphitheater in Manila, Philippines

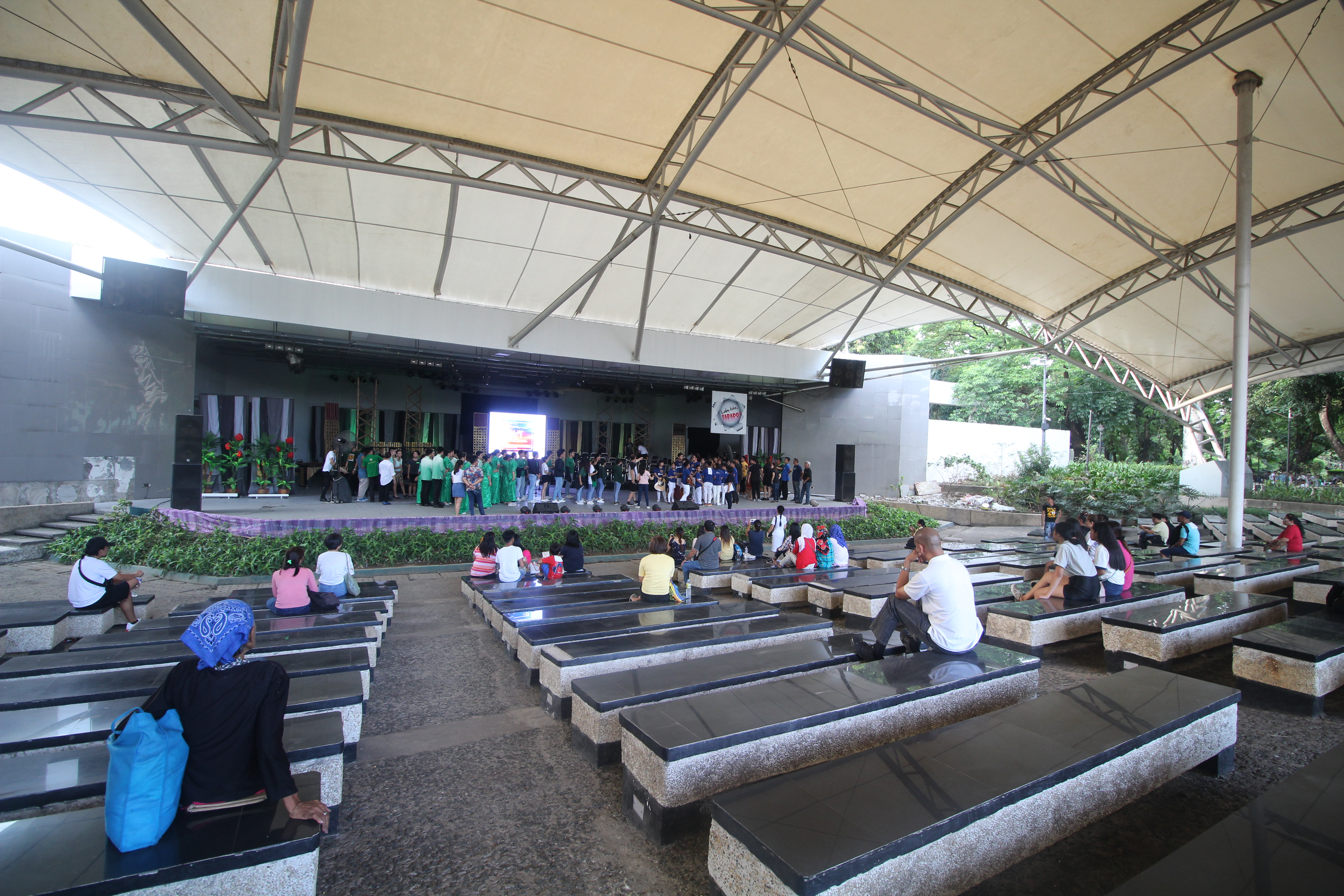
- Location: Rizal Park, Ermita, Manila, Philippines
- Type: Amphitheater

Construction
- Renovated: 2010s
- Architect: Leandro Locsin

The Rizal Park Open-Air Auditorium is a covered amphitheater situated within the Rizal Park in Manila, Philippines which serves as a venue for concerts and other events.

== History ==
There was a proposal to build an amphitheater behind the Quirino Grandstand in Rizal Park although it was later decided that the entertainment venue be built in another location inside the park beside the Chinese Gardens due to the area having more space and slope. The amphitheater was designed by National Artist Leandro Locsin. In the 2010s, a canopy roof was installed.
