= Saint Cecilia's Hall =

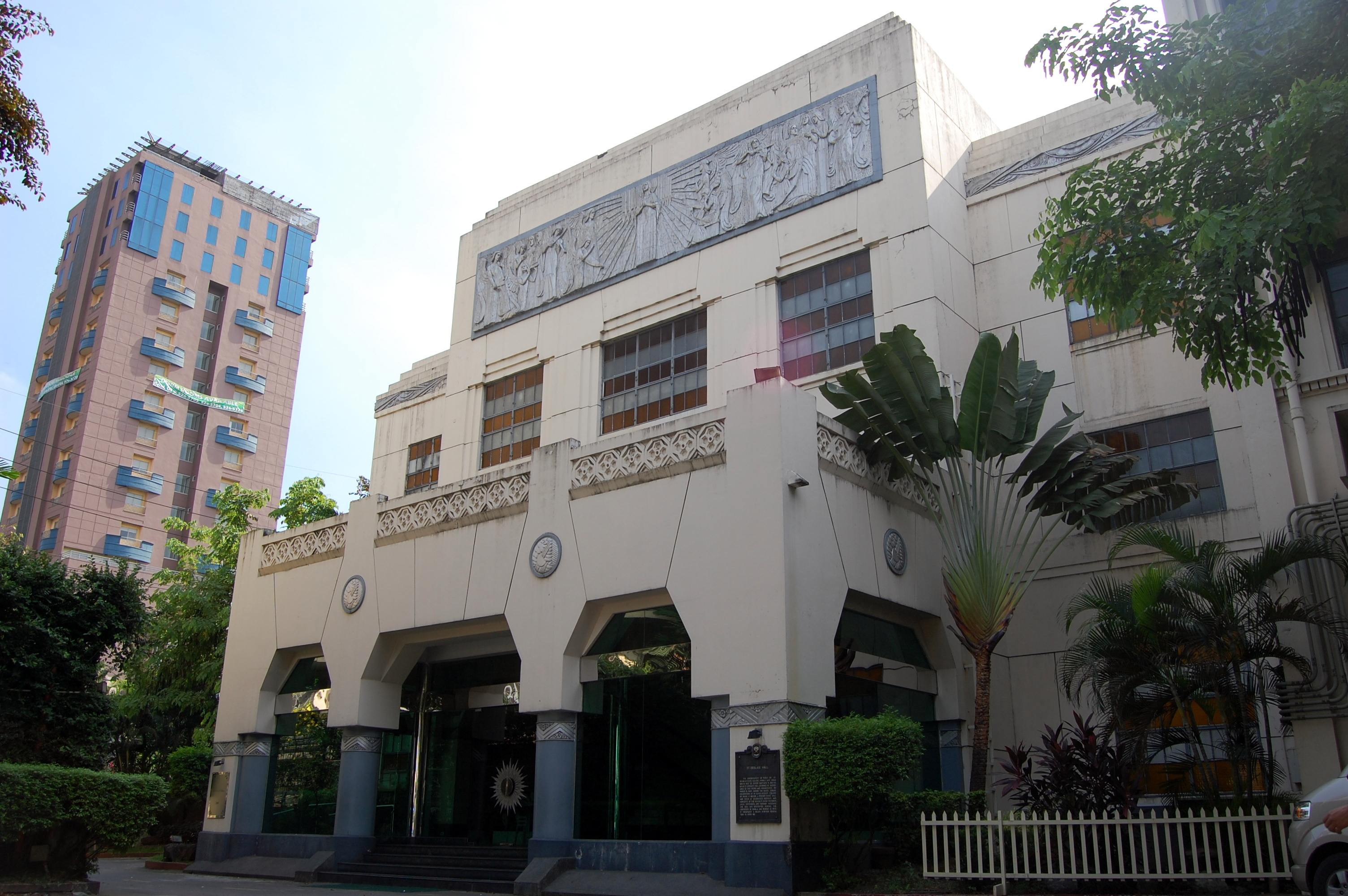
- The facade of Saint Cecilia's Hall in St. Scholastica's College Manila

- Location within Metro Manila

General information
- Architectural style: Egyptian Revival architecture
- Location: Leon Guinto Street, Malate, Manila, Philippines
- Coordinates: 14.56474°N 120.99584°E
- Completed: 1932
- Renovated: 1998

Design and construction
- Architect: Andres Luna de San Pedro
- Civil engineer: Pedro Siochi y Angeles (1886-1951), a native of Malabon, Rizal and graduated with a degree in Civil Engineering from the University of Ghent, Belgium

Renovating team
- Architects: Joel R. Lopez and Obi Mapua, Jr.

Saint Cecilia's Hall is a concert hall in Manila, Philippines. Opened in 1932, it is attached to St. Scholastica's College, Manila and is a noted example of Art Deco architecture.

== History ==
The Conservatory of Music of St. Scholastica's College was founded in 1907 by Sister Baptista Battig OSB, herself a noted concert pianist. In 1932 with the growing popularity of concert music in Manila, Philippines, St. Scholastica's College built a concert hall and named it St. Cecilia's Hall. It was built under the supervision of the renowned engineering firm Pedro Siochi and Company. The hall was named after Saint Cecilia, the patron saint of music and musicians, and soon become the venue of numerous recitals and concerts featuring pianists from St. Scholastica's College-Manila. St. Cecilia's Hall host not only their student's performance venue needs but also Manila's growing social calendar. The forerunner to the Cultural Center of the Philippines, St. Cecilia's Hall was designed by a notable Filipino architect, Andres Luna de San Pedro in the Egyptian Art Deco style.

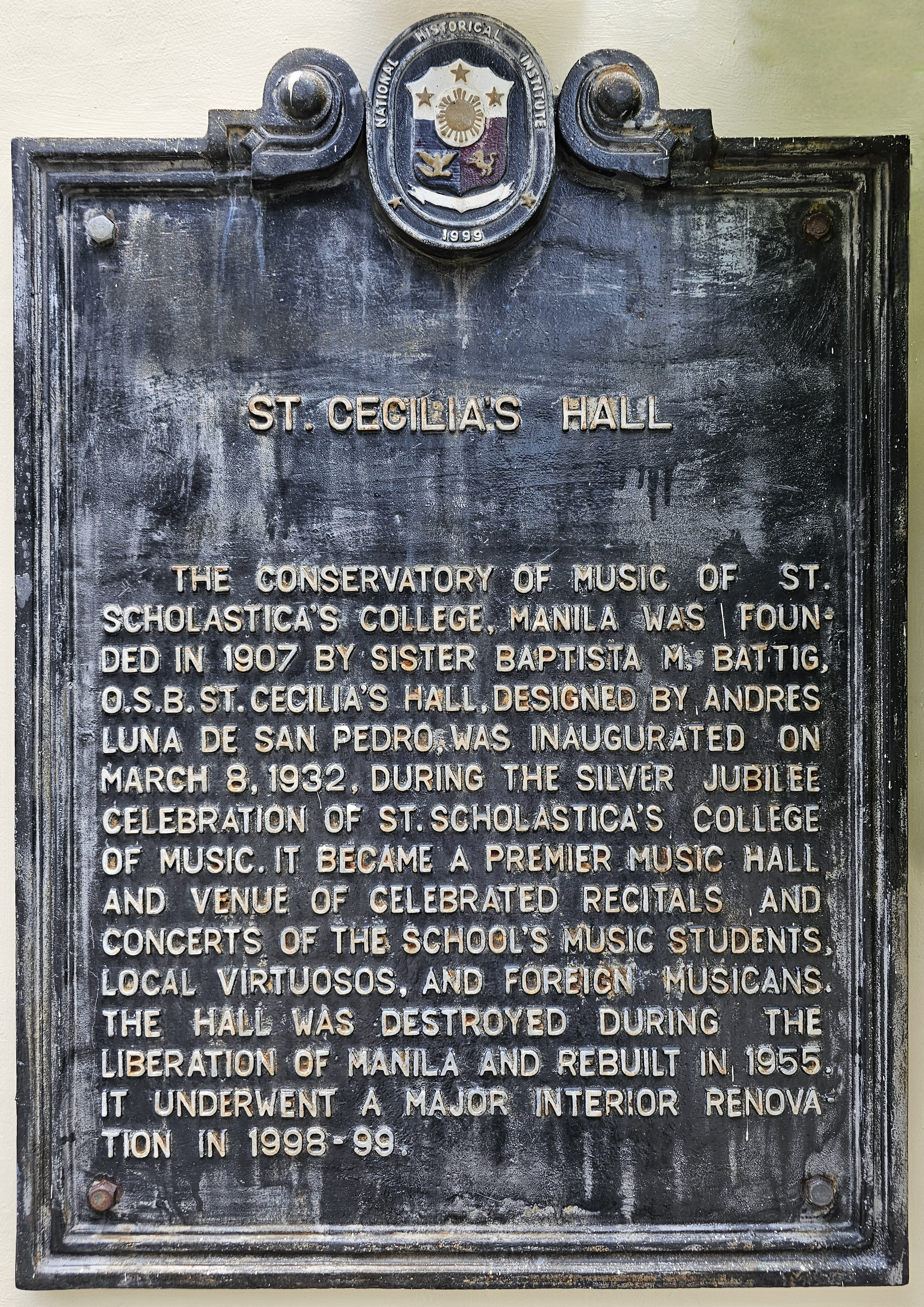
Historical marker created by the National Historical Institute to commemorate the concert hall

In 1945, St. Cecilia's Hall was almost completely damaged by the American forces during the Liberation of Manila. Nine years later, reconstruction started under the supervision of architect Roberto Novenario and Engineer Ramon del Rosario. In 1955, St. Cecilia's Hall reopened and soon assumed the premier concert venue in Manila, with famous musician both Filipino and foreign performers performing on its stage. With the emergence of performing arts on St. Scholastica's campus, it was also the setting of many concerts, plays, pageants and oratorical contests. In the latter years, with the opening of bigger performing arts venue, soon St. Cecilia's Hall become confined purely to school affairs. In 1998, St. Cecilia's Hall again underwent extensive renovation and reopened on July 16, 2000. The interior went into a complete modern restructuring and design led by architect Joel Lopez and architect Obi Mapua. A year into its renovation, the National Historical Institute (today National Historical Commission of the Philippines) declared the St. Cecilia's Hall as a National Cultural Landmark.
