= Kooky Tuason =

Filipino spoken word artist and radio personality

Kooky Tuason is a Filipino spoken word artist, advocate, and educator.

== Career ==
Kooky Tuason has been in the Spoken Word scene since 2005. She was featured in Manila Bulletin's Women of 2015, Lifestyle section and Philippine Daily Inquirer's Super Section "A woman's way with Words". She had an online radio channel to inspire and empower women called Romancing Venus Radio.

She has her own record label, Bigkas Pilipinas Records, focused on Philippine poetry.

=== Spoken word ===
She has 7 Spoken Word albums: Romancing Venus 1, Romancing Venus 2, Bigkas Pilipinas, In Transit: Manila x Toronto (2012), Southversive, Bigkas Pilipinas on JAM 88.3 Vol 1 and Bigkas Pilipinas on JAM 88.3 Vol 2.

She created the first and only Spoken Word radio show at Jam 88.3 in the Philippines, "Bigkas Pilipinas", from 2007 to 2009, then went back on air on 2018. Her show was nominated at the KBP Golden Dove Awards and Catholic Mass Media Awards for Best Culture and Arts Program. It now can be also now be streamed via Spotify, Apple Podcasts and other streaming sites.

She performed her Spoken Word track, Holdap, from the album Bigkas Pilipinas, in the indie film Rome and Juliet.

She has performed at the Hyderabad Literary Festival in India, Kalinga Literary Festival, Bhubaneswar, India, and the ASEAN Literary Festival in Indonesia.

=== Online presence ===
She launched her online educational channel Thinking Man's Classroom on February 16, 2015. Her shows include a spoken word show "For Word and By Word", a philosophical debate/talk show "Principals of Principle", a dark storytelling show "A Museum of Randomly Perfected Broken Bodies", a show for geeks "Random Fandom", a show on the art scene and artists in the Philippines "Art Is", an intellectual drama series "Eden", a show on languages "Pass the Message" and a show on mentalism "Mind Over Matter".

=== Books ===
Her coffee table book Picket Lines : Dialogues between Eves, among Eves and for Eves was launched on March 5, 2015, and aims to empower women with the one line statements written on the models bodies.

She has 2 graphic novels under her belt, Eve of the Grey and The House on Road No 10 and a zine "Brother Louie Lives Next Door and other 100 Word Stories Around The Neighborhood".
