= St. Scholastica's College, Manila =

Catholic women's college in Manila, Philippines

St. Scholastica's College Manila
- Kolehiyo ng Santa Escolastica (Filipino)
- Motto: Ora et Labora (Latin)
- Motto in English: Prayer and Work
- Type: Private Catholic Non-profit All-girls Basic and Higher education institution
- Established: December 1906; 119 years ago
- Founder: Congregation of the Missionary Benedictine Sisters of Tutzing
- Religious affiliation: Roman Catholic (Benedictine Sisters)
Academic affiliations
PAASCU CWC	ASAIHL I-SSI
- President: Sister Rosario Obiniana OSB
- Administrative staff: 800
- Students: 9,856
- Location: Leon Guinto Street, Singalong, Metro Manila, Philippines; 14°33′51″N 120°59′47″E
- Campus: Urban Area 36,655.50 square metres (3.665550 ha)
- Alma Mater song: Let's Cheer for St. Scholastica
- Colors: Blue and White
- Nicknames: Scholastican; Kulasa
- Sporting affiliations: WNCAA, WCSA; Manila Athletics
- Website: ssc.edu.ph
- Location in Manila Location in Metro Manila Location in Luzon Location in the Philippines

St. Scholastica's College Manila, also referred to by its acronym SSC or colloquially St. Scho, is a private Catholic basic and higher education institution for women founded and managed by the Congregation of the Missionary Benedictine Sisters of Tutzing in a 3.66 hectares (36,600 m^{2}) lot in Malate, Manila, Philippines. It was established in 1906 initially offering elementary academic programs. It started admitting high school students in 1907 and opened its collegiate department in 1920. It pioneered in formal music education in the Philippines, opening a Conservatory of Music in 1907.

Although Saint Scholastica's College is an exclusive school for women, admission of male students in the Music, Fine Arts, Interior Design, and preschool programs has been allowed. The college is recognized by the Department of Education and the Commission on Higher Education and also a charter member of the Philippine Accrediting Association of Schools, Colleges and Universities. It has earned Level III accreditation on all of its respective departments and schools. The college had its centennial celebration on December 3, 2006, at the Quirino Grandstand in Rizal Park, Ermita, Manila.

== History ==
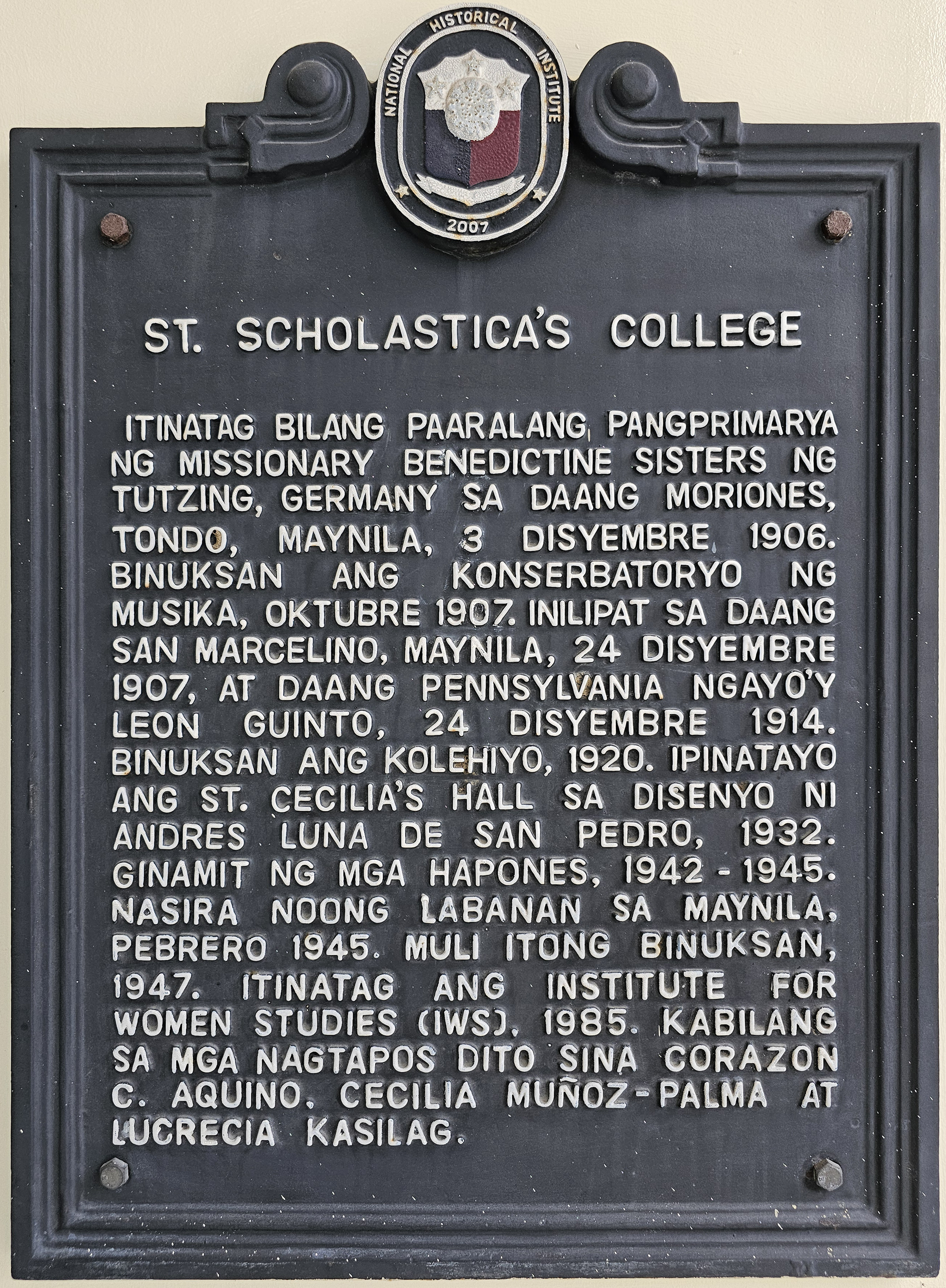
Historical marker installed in 2007 by the National Historical Institute

The college was founded by five young German sisters: Mother M. Ferdinanda Hoelzer, OSB, Sr. Petronilla Keller, OSB, Sr. Cresentia Veser, OSB, Sr. Winfrieda Mueller, OSB, and Novice Alexia Ruedenauer on December 3, 1906 at the request of Apostolic Delegate Monsignor Dom Ambrose Agius, O.S.B. and Archbishop of Manila Jeremiah James Harty, D.D. to give religious education to the children of Manila. The site of the college was then a small residential house surrounded by fishermen's huts in the fishing village of Tondo. There were then six paying students and 50 non-paying students or scholars.

A year after the college opened, it moved to a property in San Marcelino Street in Manila which was later occupied by St. Theresa's College (Manila) and where Adamson University now stands. The school was then housed in an old military barracks.

On December 14, 1914, the college was moved again to another site in Singalong Street where the college presently stands. The latest campus is bounded by Estrada Street on the north, P. Ocampo Street on the south, Singalong Street on the east and Leon Guinto Street on the west.

The land, about 3 hectares (30,000 m^{2}) was bought for the amount of two cents per square meter. The college was ravaged by World War II where its school buildings were all destroyed. Reconstruction of the buildings began in 1946 and took nine years to restore.

Important Cultural Property marker installed in 2024 by the National Museum of the Philippines

In 2024, the campus' five main buildings, namely the St. Scholastica Building, St. Cecilia's Hall, St. Hildegard Building, St. Benedict Building, and St. Scholastica's Chapel, were designated as "Important Cultural Properties" by the National Museum of the Philippines.

== Academics ==
=== Academic linkages ===
The college is a member of the South Manila Inter-Constitutional Schools along with De La Salle University, Philippine Women's University, Philippine Christian University, Adamson University, Philippine Normal University, and the St. Paul University Manila. The students of the member schools may take accredited subjects in their chosen school for cross-enrollment. The college is also part of the Women's Consortium Colleges which includes Miriam College in Katipunan, Assumption College San Lorenzo in Makati, La Consolacion College Manila in Mendiola, St. Paul University Quezon City, and the College of the Holy Spirit Manila in Mendiola.

== Notable alumnae and students ==
- Corazon Cojuangco-Aquino - President of the Philippines (1986-1992); mother of President Benigno S. Aquino III and widow of Sen. Benigno S. Aquino Jr.
- Margaux Salcedo - Undersecretary of the Department of Budget and Management and columnist of the Philippine Daily Inquirer
- Risa Hontiveros-Baraquel - Senator
- Alisah Bonaobra - Singer
- Fille Cainglet-Cayetano - Former player of Ateneo de Manila University's varsity volleyball team the Lady Blue Eagles
- Dzi Gervacio - Former player of Ateneo de Manila University's varsity volleyball team the Lady Blue Eagles
- Mika Reyes - Former player of De la Salle University's varsity volleyball team the Lady Spikers
- Jessey de Leon - Former player of the University of Santo Tomas's varsity volleyball team the Golden Tigresses
- Aia de Leon - vocalist, Imago
- Andrea del Rosario - actress
- Gloria Maria Aspillera Diaz - Miss Universe (1969), later became an actress and television personality
- Pia Guanio - TV host
- Barbie Almalbis-Honasan - Singer
- Toni Leviste - equestrian
- Maria Clara Lorenzo-Lobregat - former Mayor and Congresswoman of Zamboanga City
- Kitchie Nadal - Singer, composer
- Cecilia Muñoz-Palma - first woman Supreme Court Justice of the Philippines
- Tina Monzon Palma - Program Director, ABS-CBN Bantay Bata 163; Newscaster, ABS-CBN
- Aurora Pijuan - Miss International 1970
- Menchu Lauchengco-Yulo - Theatre actress
- Heaven Peralejo - actress, singer
- Mikee Quintos - actress, singer
- Maria Ressa (til third grade) - CEO & Executive Editor, Rappler; Former ABS-CBN News and Current Affairs Dept head; Former Jakarta bureau chief, Nobel laureate, CNN International
- Josephine Cojuangco-Reyes - President, Far Eastern University (1985-1989), Vice President - Hacienda Luisita
- Dulce Saguisag - politician, former Secretary of Department of Social Welfare and Development
- Mercedes Arrastia Tuason - Diplomatic Ambassador to the Holy See, Vatican.
- Nancy Binay - Senator
- Abigail Binay - Mayor of Makati
- Charlie Dizon - Actress
- Patricia Lasaten - Keyboardist, Ben&Ben
- Agnes Reoma - Bassist, Ben&Ben
- Bong Coo - Athlete; Philippines' first athlete recognized by the Guinness World Records.
- Amalia Fuentes - actress, businesswoman

== Buildings ==
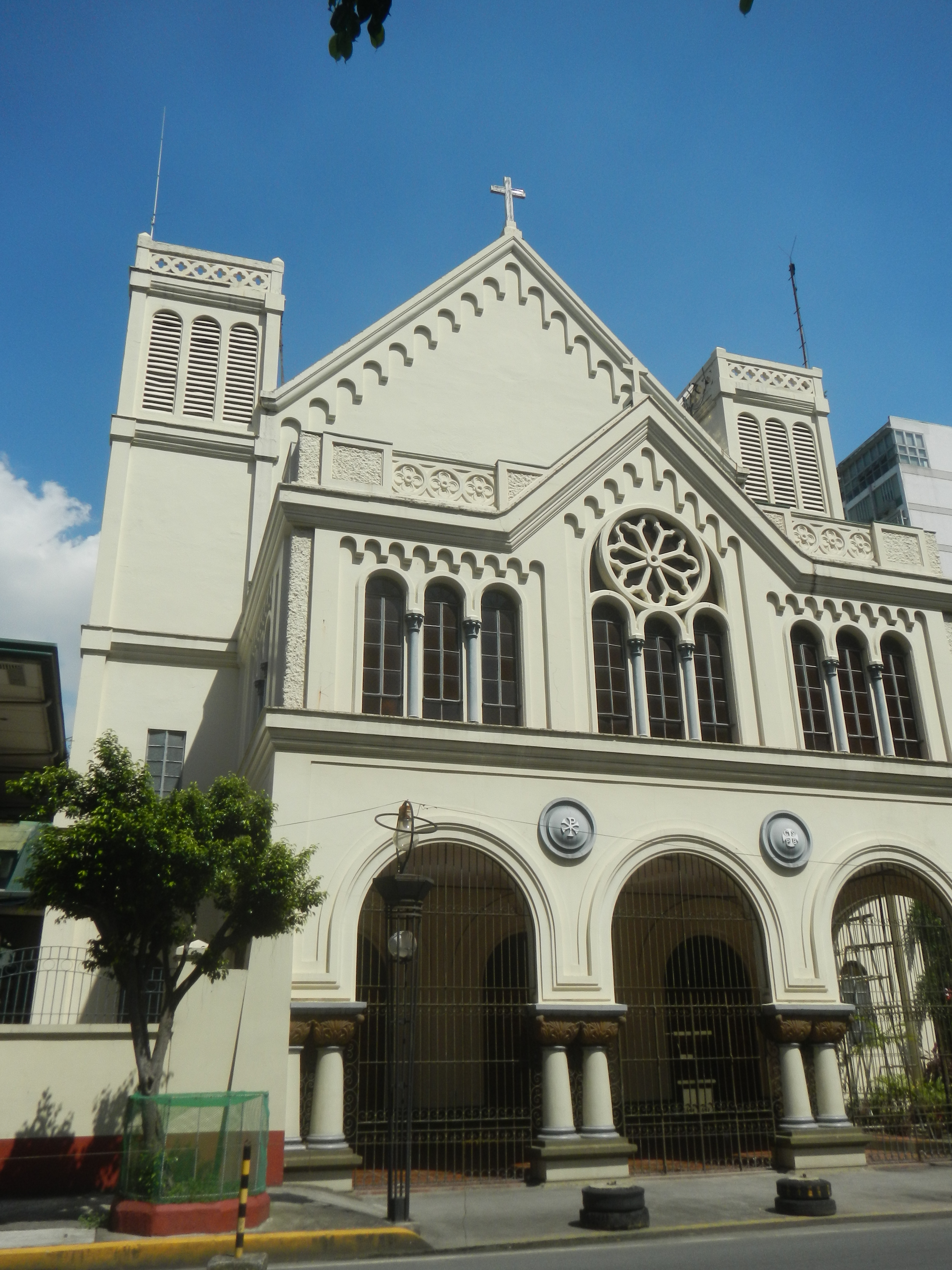
Chapel

- Saint Cecilia's Hall
- St. Hildegarde Building
- St. Joseph Hall

== See also ==
- St. Scholastica's Academy Marikina, Metro Manila
