= List of universities and colleges in Tianjin =

The following is List of Universities and Colleges in Tianjin.

Note: Institutions without full-time bachelor programs are not listed. And all lists are by English alphabet.

Name	Chinese name	Type
Nankai University	南开大学	National (Direct)
Tianjin University	天津大学	National (Direct)
Tianjin University of Science and Technology	天津科技大学	Municipal
Tianjin Polytechnic University	天津工业大学	Municipal
Civil Aviation University of China	中国民航大学	National (other)
Tianjin University of Technology	天津理工大学	Municipal
Tianjin Agricultural University	天津农学院	Municipal
Tianjin Medical University	天津医科大学	Municipal
Tianjin University of Traditional Chinese Medicine	天津中医药大学	Municipal
Tianjin Normal University	天津师范大学	Municipal
Tianjin University of Technology and Education	天津职业技术师范大学	Municipal
Tianjin Foreign Studies University	天津外国语大学	Municipal
Tianjin University of Commerce	天津商业大学	Municipal
Tianjin University of Finance and Economics	天津财经大学	Municipal
Tianjin University of Sport	天津体育学院	Municipal
Tianjin Conservatory of Music	天津音乐学院	Municipal
Tianjin Academy of Fine Arts	天津美术学院	Municipal
Tianjin Chengjian University	天津城建大学	Municipal
Tianshi College	天津天狮学院	Private
Tianjin Sino-German University of Applied Sciences	天津中德应用技术大学	Private
Binhai School of Foreign Affairs, Tianjin Foreign Studies University	天津外国语大学滨海外事学院	Private
Art and Culture College, Tianjin University of Sport	天津体育学院运动与文化艺术学院	Private
Boustead College, Tianjin University of Commerce	天津商业大学宝德学院	Private
Clinical Medical College, Tianjin Medical University	天津医科大学临床医学院	Private
Binhai College, Nankai University	南开大学滨海学院	Private
Jingu College, Tianjin Normal University	天津师范大学津沽学院	Private
Zhonghuan Information College, Tianjin University of Technology	天津理工大学中环信息学院	Private
Tianjin College, University of Science and Technology Beijing	北京科技大学天津学院	Private
Renai College, Tianjin University	天津大学仁爱学院	Private
Pearl River College, Tianjin University of Finance and Economics	天津财经大学珠江学院	Private

== Others ==
- Tianjin Crafts and Arts Professional College
- Tianjin Open University
- The Florida International University Tianjin Center, opened in 2006 as a cooperative venture between the municipal government and the Miami-based university.
- Tsin Ku University was a Catholic university established by the French Jesuits in Tianjin.
- Raffles Design Institute Tianjin is a joint-project between Tianjin University of Commerce, Boustead College and Raffles Design Institute, Singapore.
