= Fazal Ahmad Khalid =

Pakistani educator and scientist

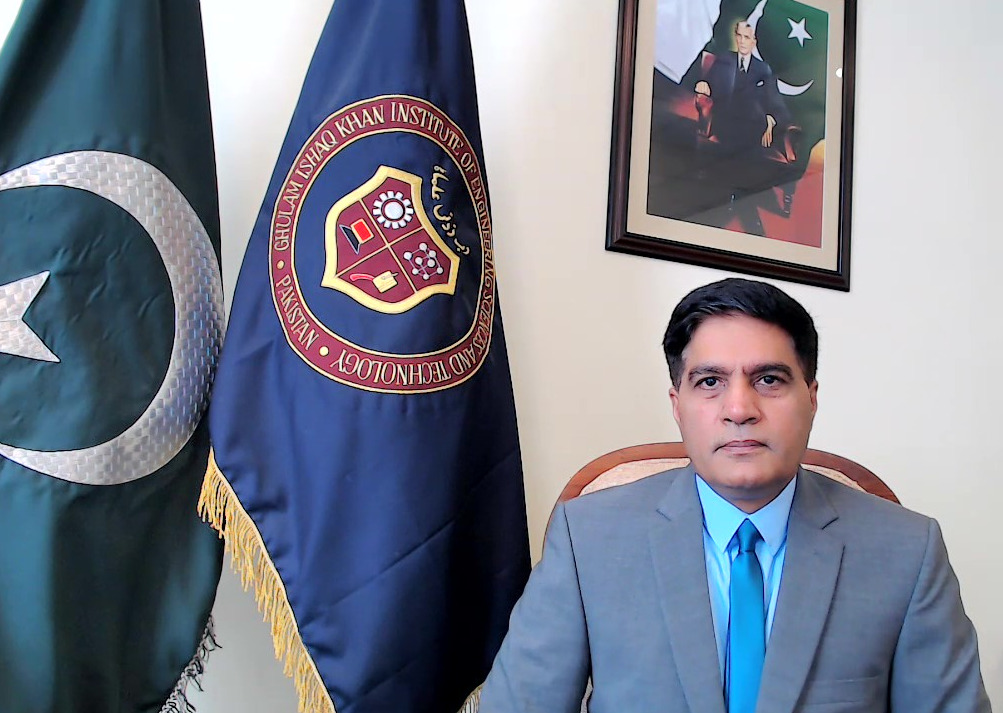
- Born: Kasur, Punjab, Pakistan
- Education: University of Engineering and Technology, Lahore; University of Oxford
- Awards: Sitara-e-Imtiaz (Star of Excellence) Award by the President of Pakistan in 2008
- Scientific career
- Fields: Materials Engineering and Nanotechnology
- Workplaces: Rector of Ghulam Ishaq Khan Institute of Engineering Sciences and Technology, Topi Former Chairman of Punjab Higher Education Commission Former Acting VC Punjab Tainjin University of Technology; Former VC University of Engineering and Technology, Lahore; Former Pro Rector Academics Ghulam Ishaq Khan Institute of Engineering Sciences and Technology; University of Oxford; University of Leeds; EMPA Switzerland

Fazal Ahmad Khalid (Urdu: فضل احمد خالد; born 31 December 1957) is a Pakistani academician and administrator. Presently, he serves as the Rector of Ghulam Ishaq Khan Institute of Engineering Sciences and Technology, Topi. Prof Dr. Fazal Ahmad Khalid, SI, has extensive experience as a university administrator and has served in various positions at the national level. He has previously served as the Chairman of the Punjab Higher Education Commission, Vice Chancellor of the University of Engineering and Technology, Lahore, Acting VC of Punjab Tianjin University of Technology (PTUT), Vice Chairman of the Pakistan Engineering Council, and head of PEC Accreditation Board and Curriculum Committee. He also worked at Ghulam Ishaq Khan Institute of Engineering Sciences and Technology for 21 years as Pro-Rector Academics, Dean, and Professor of Materials and Nanotechnology from 1994 to 2014. He is also the recipient of the Sitara-i-Imtiaz (Star of Excellence) Award by the President of Pakistan and the PEC Engineers’ Excellence Award.

== Education ==
Fazal Ahmad Khalid completed his engineering education at University of Engineering and Technology, Lahore. Then he went to England for further studies in Metallurgical Engineering and Metallurgy & Materials Engineering and received his higher education degrees from the University of Oxford.

== Career ==
He was appointed as Acting VC of Punjab Tianjin University of Technology (PTUT) in 2018 which is a joint cooperation program of Tianjin University of Technology and Education (TUTE), Tianjin Chengjian University (TCU) and Tianjin Polytechnic University (TPU).

He also served as the Vice Chairman of Pakistan Engineering Council and head of PEC Accreditation Board and Curriculum Committee for engineering programs. He had additional charge of Khawaja Fareed University of Engineering and Information Technology (KFUEIT) Rahim Yar Khan and Muhammad Nawaz Sharif University of Engineering & Technology (MNS UET) Multan in 2015–2016. He also worked at Ghulam Ishaq Khan Institute of Engineering Sciences and Technology (GIKI) for 21 years as Pro-Rector and Dean from 1994 to 2014.

His research interests are in the field of Nanotechnology and Materials Engineering and he has published over 200 research papers with accumulative impact factor of 121. He had Postdoc Fellowships in University of Oxford and Leeds, UK and Guest Professorship for short-term research program on Diamond-Based Composite Materials at the Swiss Federal Labs (EMPA) Switzerland. Earlier he worked at PCSIR Lahore and Pakistan Steel Mills, Karachi.

He is a Fellow of Royal Microscopical Society, Oxford, The Institute of Materials, Minerals and Mining (FIMMM), London and the Pakistan Academy of Sciences. He is actively involved in the change and paradigm shift to implement Outcome Based Education (OBE) of engineering programs, quality assurance and accreditation manual to harmonize with Washington Accord and CPD for international recognition and ranking global mobility of engineers.

== Awards and honours ==
- PEC Engineers’ Excellence Award by President of Pakistan in 2022.
- Sitara-i-Imtiaz (Star of Excellence) Award by the President of Pakistan in 2008.
- Gold medal Award by the Pakistan Academy of Sciences in 1999.
- Vanadis Award by Institute of Materials, Minerals and Mining, London, UK in 1994.
