= Urban construction =

Urban construction may refer to:

- Urbanization or urban planning
- Tianjin Urban Construction Institute
- Ministry of Housing and Urban-Rural Development of the People's Republic of China
