= Punjab Tianjin University of Technology =

University in Lahore, Pakistan

- Type: Public
- Established: 2018
- Affiliations: Higher Education Commission (Pakistan), National Technology Council (Pakistan), Tianjin University of Technology, Tianjin Polytechnic University, Tianjin Chengjian University
- Chancellor: Governor of the Punjab
- Vice-Chancellor: Prof. Dr. Adeel Akram
- Location: Lahore, Punjab, Pakistan
- Nickname: PTUT
- Website: ptut.edu.pk

The Punjab University of Technology (PTUT) is a public university located in Lahore, Punjab, Pakistan.
