= TGU =

TGU may refer to:

- Tiangong University, a public university in Tianjin, China
- Tokyo Gakugei University, a national university in Tokyo, Japan
- Toncontín International Airport (IATA code: TGU), an international airport in Tegucigalpa, Honduras
- Transglobal Underground, a London-based music collective
- Тартуский государственный университет (Tartuskiy gosudárstvennyy universitét) - Tartu State University, former name of the University of Tartu
