= Zubair Ahmad Khan =

Zubair Ahmad Khan served as an acting vice-chancellor of University of Engineering & Technology, Lahore (UET), from October 16, 2014, to December 17, 2014. He was succeeded by Fazal Ahmad Khalid.

Khan is currently working as a professor at the Department of Electrical Engineering, University of Engineering & Technology, Lahore. He specializes in the area of remote monitoring, data acquisition, metering, and protection of power and industrial systems. Zubair is also affiliated with the Al-Khwarizmi Institute of Computer Sciences as a Consultant.

As a principal investigator, Khan won the US Aid Grant and various NTDC Wapda Grants. In 1975, he earned his B.Sc. in electrical engineering from the University of Engineering & Technology, Lahore, with specialization in telecommunications. He completed his M.Sc. in electrical engineering from UET in 1985. Zubair started his career as a lecturer at the Department of Electrical Engineering at UET in 1977. For his postgraduate studies, he traveled to England to join the University of Manchester Institute of Science and Technology (UMIST) and completed his master's and Ph.D. in 1987 and 1990 respectively.

In addition to his teaching services, Khan has served on the following key assignments at the University of Engineering & Technology, Lahore.

- Dean, Department of Electrical Engineering
- Chairman, Department of Electrical Engineering
- Senior Warden, Halls of residences
- Director Studies
- In charge Coordination MNS-UET, Multan
- Member Syndicate - Dean

== Research ==
Khan has published more than 30 research papers in the field of remote metering, data acquisition, energy management systems, and e-infrastructure development in journals like IEEE, Sensor technologies, and application (SENSORCOMM'09) and Open source systems and technologies (ICOSST), 2013. His most popular research on load monitoring for nonlinear devices has been cited 33 times in other researches.
