= De La Salle–College of Saint Benilde =

Roman Catholic college in Manila, Philippines

De La Salle-College of Saint Benilde
- Dalubhasaan ng De La Salle San Benildo (Filipino)
- Former names: College of Career Development (1980–1988); De La Salle University-College of Saint Benilde (1988–2003)
- Motto: Fides, Servitio, Communio in Missionibus (Latin)
- Motto in English: Faith, Service, Communion in Mission
- Type: Private, Catholic, research, non-stock, coeducational secondary and tertiary education institution
- Established: 1988; 38 years ago
- Religious affiliation: Roman Catholic (Christian Brothers)
- Academic affiliations: De La Salle Philippines
- Chancellor: Benhur A. Ong
- President: Br. Edmundo Fernandez, FSC
- Administrative staff: 1,775 (2017)
- Students: 9,690 (2017)
- Location: 2544 Taft Avenue Malate, Manila, Philippines; 14°33′49.50″N 120°59′42.64″E
- Campus: Urban; Taft: 6,380 m^{2} (68,700 sq ft); AKIC: 2,100 m^{2} (23,000 sq ft); Design and Arts: 4,560 m^{2} (49,100 sq ft) Satellite campus: DLS-CSB Antipolo; Aseana (upcoming): 3,845 m^{2} (41,390 sq ft)
- Hymn: De La Salle Alma Mater Hymn
- Colors: Green, Black and White
- Nicknames: Benilde Blazers (college men's varsity teams); Lady Blazers (college women's varsity teams); Greenies (high school boys' varsity teams)
- Sporting affiliations: NCAA, WNCAA, Premier V-League
- Mascot: Blazie
- Website: www.benilde.edu.ph

De La Salle Alma Mater
- De La Salle University Chorale and produced by the De La Salle-College of Saint Benilde-Center for Institutional Communications (Benilde-CIC): file; help
- Location in Manila Location in Metro Manila Location in Luzon Location in the Philippines

The De La Salle–College of Saint Benilde (Filipino: Dalubhasaan ng De La Salle San Benildo; French: Collège De La Salle de Sainte Benilde), also known as DLS-CSB or Benilde, is a private, Catholic secondary and tertiary education institution established by the De La Salle Brothers, located in the Malate district of Manila, Philippines. It operates four campuses, all of which are located within the vicinity of Malate, Manila, along with an upcoming satellite campus in Aseana City, Parañaque. The college is a member institution of De La Salle Philippines (DLSP), a network of 16 Catholic Lasallian institutions. Benilde is also a member of a 350-year-old international network of over 1,200 Lasallian educational institutions globally established by the De La Salle Christian Brothers in 82 countries.

The college was established in 1980 during the administration of Br. Andrew Gonzalez, FSC as the College of Career Development, a night school for working students at De La Salle University-Manila. In 1988, it was renamed the De La Salle University–College of Saint Benilde after the Vatican's Patron Saint of Vocations – Saint Bénilde Romançon, a Christian Brother who taught in France during the 19th century. In 1994, the college became autonomous. In 2004, along with a restated vision and mission, received its present name, dropping the University and becoming De La Salle–College of Saint Benilde.

The college uses "learner-centered instruction" to offer degree and non-degree programs in the arts, design, management, service industries, computer applications in business, and special fields of study. It is the first in the Philippines to offer degrees in AB Animation (ABANI), AB Photography (ABPHOTO), AB Film (ABFILM), AB Multimedia Arts (ABMMA), AB Production Design (ABPRD), AB Fashion Design and Merchandising (AB-FDM), AB Music Production (ABMP) and BPA Dance (BPA-D).

The college's sports teams, known as the Saint Benilde Blazers, compete in the National Collegiate Athletic Association with La Salle Green Hills representing the junior division. Since joining the league in 1998, the college has won five general championships, first in the 2005 season, back-to-back in the 2007 and 2008 seasons and another back-to-back win in 2013 and 2014 seasons.

== History ==
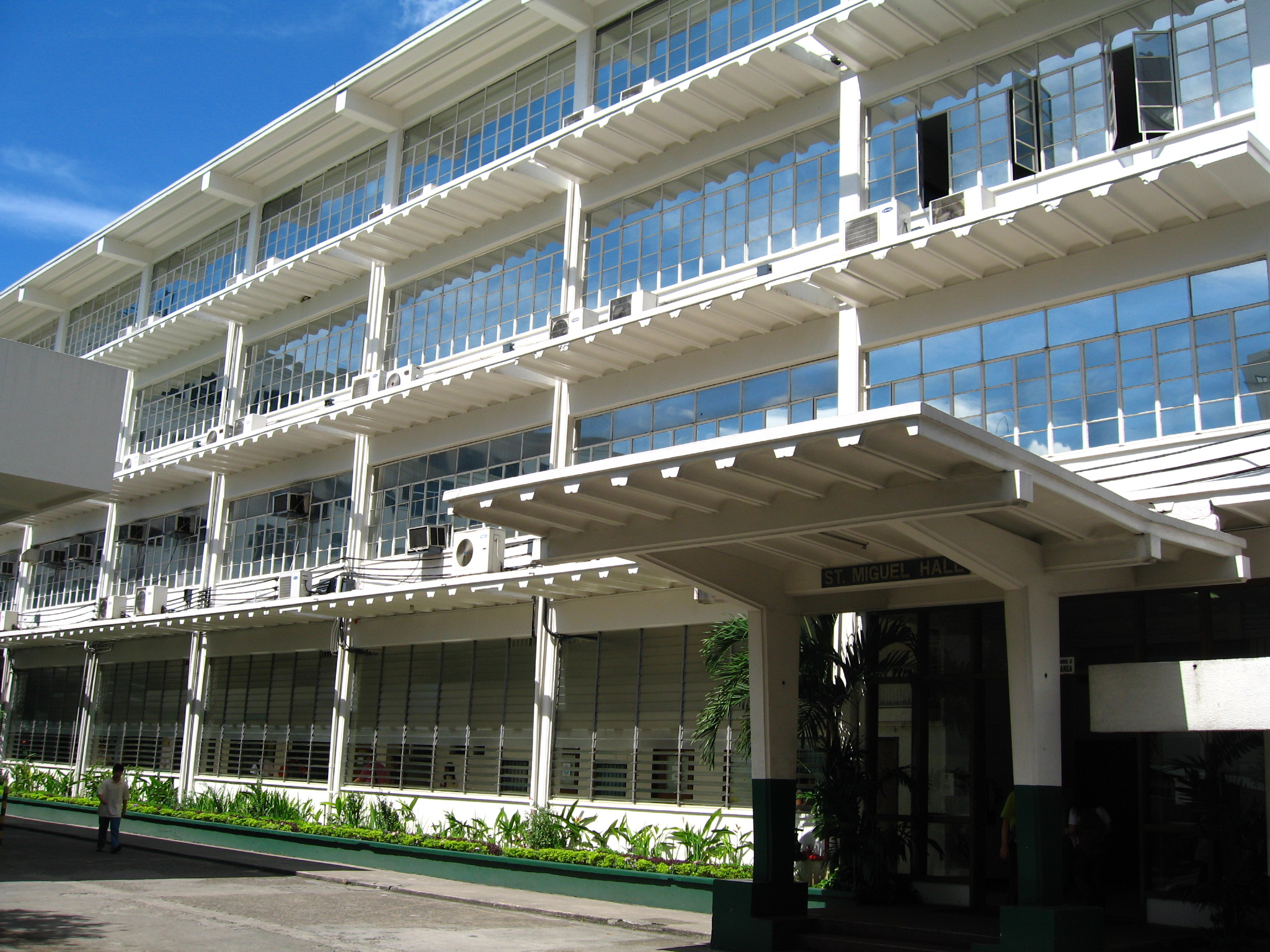
The original Benilde Hall in De La Salle University Manila which housed the college until 1989. It was renamed Miguel Hall after the college left.

=== Early history (1980–1987) ===
In 1980, De La Salle University-Manila opened an academic unit known as the College of Career Development, an evening school for working students. It was Saint Benilde Romancon, FSC who pioneered the development of evening classes for adult working students for continuing education hundreds of years ago. In 1984, the Preparatory Studies Department (PSD) was established to allow students to cope with the requirements of subsequent degree-oriented courses in regular undergraduate colleges. In 1985, the college was renamed the Community College. In May 1987, the PSD was phased out and replaced by the Arts and Business Studies Area (ABSA). The ABSA offered two courses: a Bachelor of Arts degree in management with emphasis on human resources management and a Bachelor of Science degree in business administration, major in computer applications.

=== Under De La Salle University (1988–1994) ===
The Community College was officially renamed De La Salle University–College of Saint Benilde in 1988, after the establishment of the De La Salle University System. Saint Bénilde Romançon was selected as the namesake to symbolize its objective of providing innovative education for the verbally but not numerically gifted, late bloomers, disabled, as well as artists. Bénilde made room for his students in Clermont-Ferrand, regardless of their age or their mental capabilities. He also learned sign language to instruct a deaf-mute boy for his first Holy Communion.

The ABSA was renamed as the Arts and Business Studies Department (ABSD) and became the day program of the college, while the Career Development Department (CDD) remained as the college's evening program. Because of the need for more space, the college moved to its own campus at 2544 Taft Avenue in 1989. A third major program, a Bachelor of Arts degree in Interdisciplinary Studies, was offered, undertaken in consortium with the College of Liberal Arts. In 1991, the college offered certificate programs in Accounting and Bookkeeping for the deaf, and a Bachelor of Science degree in Industrial Design.

=== As an autonomous college (1994–2005) ===
Presidents of
De La Salle–College of Saint Benilde
Under De La Salle University-Manila
• Br. Andrew Gonzalez FSC, 1978–1991
• Br. Rafael Donato FSC, 1991–1994
Under the De La Salle University System
• Br. Andrew Gonzalez FSC, 1994–1998
• Br. Rolando Dizon FSC, 1998–2003
• Dr. Carmelita Quebengco, 2003–2004
• Br. Armin Luistro FSC, 2004–2006
Independent administration
• Br. Edmundo Fernandez FSC, 2006–2007
• Br. Victor A. Franco FSC, 2007–2013
• Br. Dennis M. Magbanua FSC, 2013–2019
• Br. Edmundo Fernandez FSC, incumbent

Benilde became an autonomous member of the De La Salle University System in April 1994. It ratified its proposed Constitution and By-Laws and identified Benildean core values in November 1994. The Night College, a scholarship program, was transferred from De La Salle University-Manila to the college in 1995. In the same year, the School of Design and Arts (SDA) was established, and the following degrees were offered: Bachelor of Arts in Animation, Bachelor of Arts in Film, Bachelor of Arts in Photography, Bachelor of Arts in Music Production, Bachelor of Arts in Theater Arts, Bachelor of Arts in Production Design, Bachelor of Arts major in Fashion Design and Merchandising, Bachelor of Performing Arts major in Dance, Bachelor of Science in Industrial Design, Bachelor of Science in Interior Design.

In 1996, the School of Hotel, Restaurant, and Institution Management was formed, and groundbreaking ceremonies for the Angelo King International Center building were held. The following degrees were first offered in the same year: Bachelor of Science in Business Administration, Major in Export Management; Bachelor of Science in Hotel, Restaurant, and Institution Management; Bachelor of Arts major in Fashion Design and Merchandising; Bachelor of Arts major in Consular and Diplomatic Affairs, and the Bachelor of Arts in Applied Deaf Studies. The college also established the Certificate Program Center (CPC) which offered short courses, and the Grants-in-Aid Program to provide financial assistance to students in need.

In 1997, the administration of the vocational programs of the Night College of the De La Salle University was passed on to the college in June and was renamed as the Blessed Arnould Study Assistance Program in September. In October 1997, the college held its first graduation rites independent from De La Salle University. In the same year, the college established the School of Special Studies for deaf students. In March 1998, the NCAA accepted the college's application for membership to the sports league along with La Salle Green Hills athletes as its high school representatives. In 1999, the School of Design and Arts offered the Bachelor of Arts in Multimedia Arts degree, the first of its kind in the country. Later that year, the construction of the Angelo King International Center was completed, which then housed the School of Hotel, Restaurant, and Institution Management.

In 2000, the college won its first Men's Basketball Championship title in the NCAA, marking the fastest win of any new school in the league since World War II. The college offered a BSBA degree in Information Management and a Bachelor of Arts in Music Production degree, a first of its kind. In the same year, the college held bidding for the architect of the proposed School of Design and Arts building. In 2001, the School of Special Studies was renamed as the School of Deaf Education and Applied Studies (SDEAS). A year later, the SDEAS was invited to become a member of the Post-Secondary Education Network-International.

In 2004, the non-university members of the DLSU System — Canlubang, and Medical and Health Sciences Campus — removed the term "University" from their names. The college then restated its mission and vision and was renamed De La Salle–College of Saint Benilde. Construction for the 14-storey School of Design and Arts campus was started in this year. The Certificate Program Center was expanded and renamed into the School of Professional and Continuing Education. In 2005, the college became overall champions for the first time in NCAA Season 81.

=== Recent history (2006–present) ===
East Timor President, José Ramos-Horta (left) is greeted by Br. Victor Franco FSC (center) and Br. Armin Luistro FSC (right)

In 2006, the college became a district school of De La Salle Philippines, the successor of the DLSU System. Br. Edmundo Fernandez FSC, Brother Visitor of the De La Salle Brothers Philippine District, became the college's interim president. The college became the host for the NCAA Season 82, and landed in second place for the General Championship rankings.

In 2007, the School of Design and Arts opened four new degree programs: the Bachelor of Arts degrees in Animation, Digital Filmmaking, and Photography, the first of their kind in the country, and Architecture That same year, the new 14-storey School of Design and Arts Campus opened in May in time for the start of the school year 2007–2008. The college inaugurated its first Brother President, Br. Victor Franco FSC in September.

In 2008, the School of Management and Information Technology (SMIT), in partnership with the School of Design and Arts, announced its intention to offer a new degree in game design and development, pending approval of the Commission on Higher Education. At the end of NCAA Season 83, the college again became the overall champions, winning their second title after two years.

On August 12, 2008, East Timor President, José Ramos-Horta visited the college and gave a talk entitled United in Faith, Partners in Nation-Building held at the School of Design and Arts Campus during a four-day state visit to the Philippines, which marked the first time that a foreign head of state visited the college.

In 2009, the college opened three new degree programs, the Bachelor of Science in International Hospitality Management for SHRIM, which partnered with Vatel International Hospitality School in France, the Bachelor of Science in Information Technology, Major in Game Design and Development for SMIT, the first IT program anchored in game design and development in the Philippines, and Bachelor of Science in Architecture for the SDA. The college won its third championship title in the NCAA, and became back-to-back general champions for NCAA Season 84.

Groundbreaking of a new building commenced in 2017. The building would serve as a sports center for the Benilde Blazers and a dormitory for scholars. It was inaugurated as the Benilde Sports and Dorm Building and opened in 2020. A five-story building, the complex stands on a 4,196-square-meter (45,170 sq ft) lot in San Isidro Drive corner Dominga Street with the Taft and SDA Campuses as neighbors.

In 2022, SDA had been divided into three new autonomous clusters housed under the newly renamed Design and Arts (D+A) Campus: the School of New Media Arts (SNMA), the School of Culture, Arts, and Performance (SACP), and the School of Environmental Design (SED). The decision was made in light of further strengthening creative industry systems and qualifications within the college.

== Campuses ==
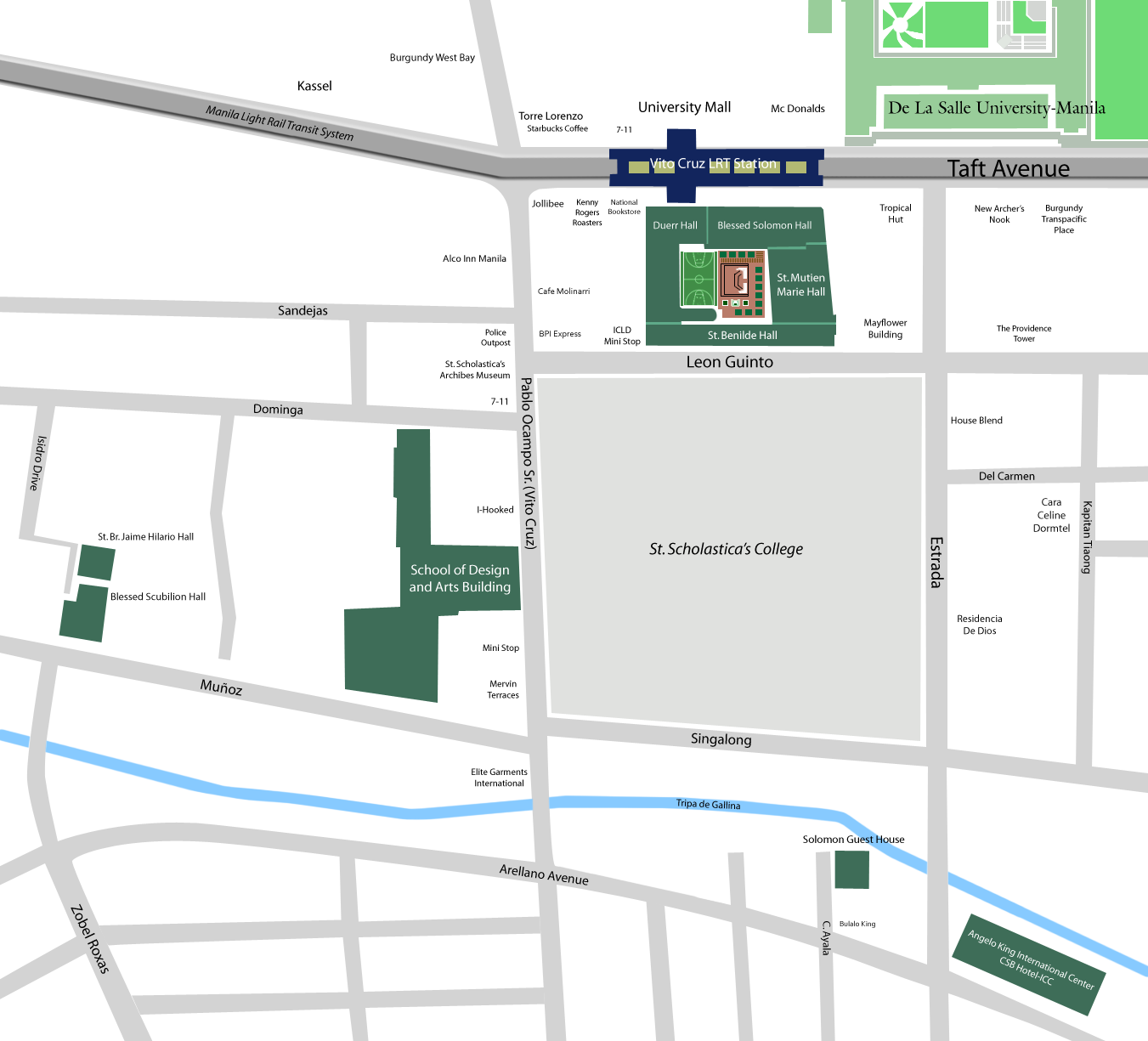
Vicinity map of DLS–CSB

The college has four campuses: the Taft Campus, the Angelo King International Center, the School of Design and Arts, and the Atrium, all in Malate, Manila. The Taft Campus is a block from De La Salle University beside St. Scholastica's College and the LRT-1 Vito Cruz Station. The college is surrounded by dormitories, condominiums, and restaurants. To travel between campuses, students may either walk or ride cycle rickshaws stationed near the campuses or the electric jeepney shuttle service provided by the college.

Other properties include the Blessed Hilario Hall on Dominga Street which functions as the college's retreat house. Beside it is the Blessed Scubilion Hall, a residence for student-athletes. The Solomon Guest House on C. Ayala Street is a restaurant and meeting area used as a hands-on workplace for selected SHRIM students where they handle the operation of the establishment.

In 2018, Benilde Antipolo opened its new building in the Antipolo city proper. The campus is the new home of the tertiary programs from La Salle College Antipolo. The school offers a bachelor's degree in Marketing Management, Accountancy, Hospitality Management, Tourism Management, Psychology, Communication Arts, and Education.

=== Taft Campus ===
The Taft Campus stands on a 6,380-square-meter (68,700 sq ft) lot that stretches from Taft Avenue to the next parallel street, Leon Guinto. The land was acquired from LBP Leasing Corporation, a subsidiary of the Land Bank of the Philippines. The campus is a square lot made up of four interconnected buildings: St. Benilde Hall, Duerr Hall, Blessed Solomon Hall, and St. Mutien Marie Hall. The Duerr Hall has a different alignment from the rest of the buildings, requiring the need for stairs and a ramp on its intersections with the Blessed Solomon Hall.

The Plaza Villarosa, named after architect Rogelio Villarosa, is on this campus' second level. It is decorated by lush plants and palm trees and has a basketball court, an elevated platform, and several cabañas with stone benches. The plaza is used as a study area and venue for events and activities such as those of student organizations. Bazaars and food establishments also temporarily set up stalls in the plaza during such events. The statue of Saint Benilde, originally located on the campus's old front gate, was moved to the plaza after its completion. Behind the statue is an 18-bell carillon, built as a memorial to the Lasallian Christian Brothers who were massacred and murdered at the De La Salle College Taft campus during World War II by 20 plus Japanese soldiers. The names of the brothers are inscribed on the bells of the carillon. The carillon and the statue, when taken together, stand as the visual representation of the college.

==== St. Benilde Hall ====
St. Benilde Hall

The first building of the college, named after Saint Bénilde Romançon, was opened on August 11, 1989. It is located at the back of the campus and was designed by Gines Rivera. The building has four levels, holding numerous lecture rooms and computer laboratories, a cafeteria, a clinic, and the office of the Information Technology Center. It also houses the offices of the School of Deaf Education and Applied Studies and the School of Management and Information Technology, as well as the Student Grants Unit and the Center for Counseling Services.

==== Duerr Hall ====
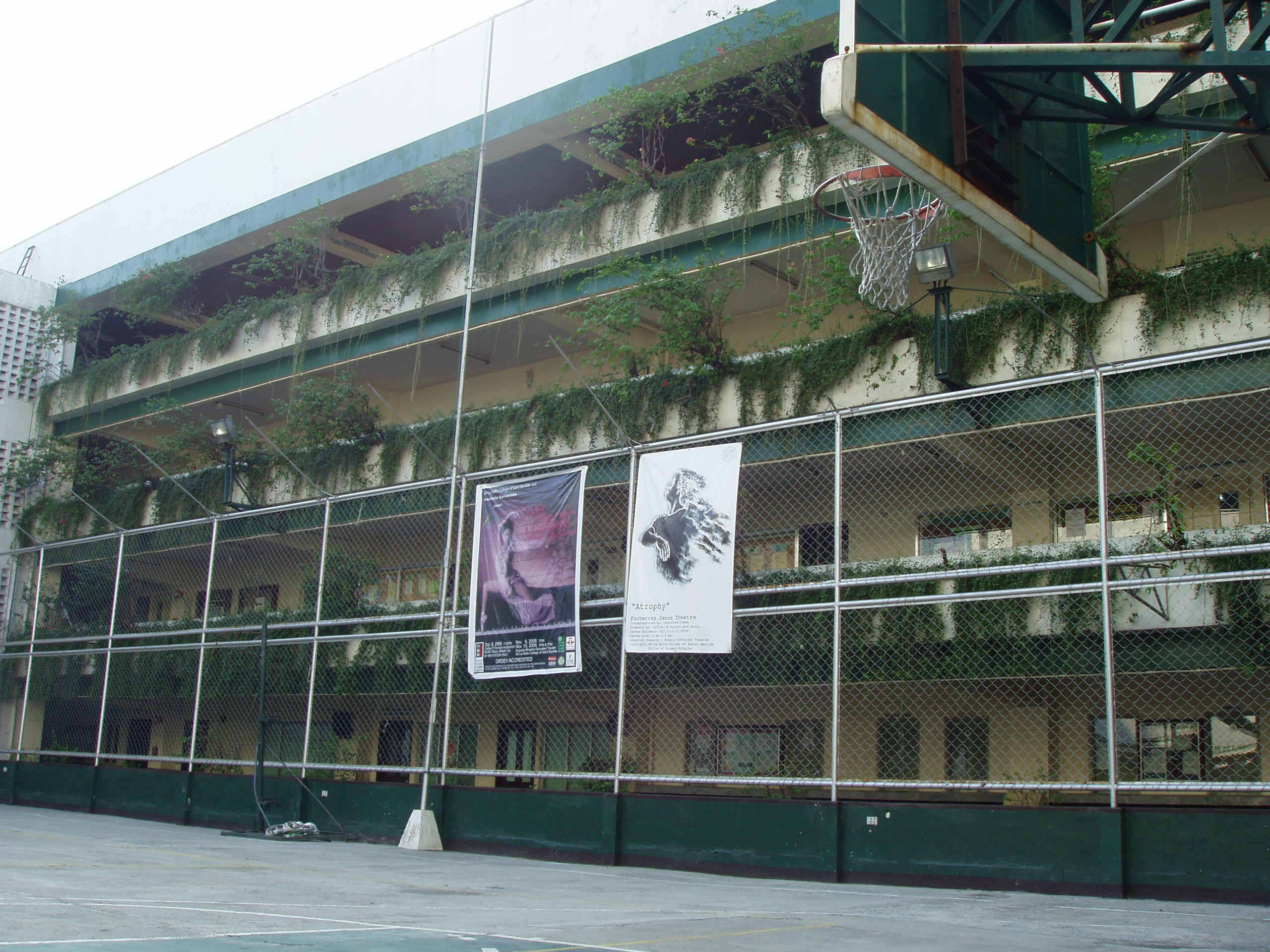
Duerr Hall

Br. Crescentius Richard Duerr FSC, president of De La Salle University from 1961 to 1966, was a visionary teacher and administrator of La Salle schools in Manila, Bacolod and Iligan City, doing missionary work for 31 years before returning to New York. He was instrumental in the transformation of De La Salle University-Manila becoming a pillar of Philippine education.

The second building of the campus, originally called "South Wing" because of its location at the southern side of the campus, was blessed on August 10, 1992, and cost 30 million pesos. It houses the Accounting Office, Faculty and Administrative offices of the School of Multidisciplinary Studies, several offices of the programs of the School of Management and Information Technology, and laboratories of the School of Deaf Education and Applied Studies. It has several classrooms and computer laboratories, and an auditorium. It also has a badminton court located on the fifth floor. The on-campus bookstore is located on the first level of the hall near the Career and Placement Office. The Duerr Hall formerly held the Multimedia and Fashion Design laboratories of the School of Design and Arts, prior to the completion of the SDA campus.

The Chapel of the Resurrection is located on the second-floor intersection of Duerr and Solomon Hall. It features glass doors, a stenciled drawing of the praying hands, a sacristy, a confessional room, and an altar showing Napoleon Abueva's "Lord of the Resurrection."

==== St. Mutien Marie Hall ====
Saint Mutien Marie Wiaux was a devoutly religious Brother who made a tremendous influence on the students under his charge through his patience and piety. He taught in Malonne for 58 years, teaching music and arts alongside Catholic dogma. He was canonized in 1989.

Construction of the third and fourth wings of the campus was approved by the Board of Trustees on January 6, 1993. Groundbreaking ceremonies were made in March 1994, while actual construction began on April 16 of the same year. The Mutien Marie Hall and the Blessed Solomon Hall were blessed at October 29, 1996. Both buildings were designed by Rogelio Villarosa and construction cost 120 million pesos.

The General Administrative Services Office occupies the first floor while the Br. Fidelis Leddy Learning Resource Center occupies the whole second level of the building. The third floor up to the fifth consists of lecture rooms. There is also a case room for thesis defense located on the third floor. The gymnasium is located on the topmost level of the building. Most of the classrooms in this building are equipped with LCD and OHP projectors, television sets with VHS players, and computers. The Mutien-Marie Hall formerly held the drafting rooms, Industrial Design laboratory, and the head office of the School of Design and Arts.

==== Blessed Solomon Hall ====
Blessed Solomon Leclerq was martyred in 1792 after refusing to swear an oath that forced the French clergy of the time to support the state. Before that, he was a teacher, director, and bursar, and was known for his love for people and for his work. He was beatified in 1926, the first Lasallian brother to be given that honor.

The main entrance of the campus is located at the first level of the Blessed Solomon Hall facing Taft Avenue. The Admissions Office and the Office of Student Behavior can be found on the ground floor, and near the vehicle, entrance is the waiting lounge, popularly known as The Airport because the fixed seats resemble an airport departure lounge. The Office of the Registrar, as well as other Executive offices, is housed on the second level of the building while the Office of Student Affairs, Office of Culture and Arts, Social Action Office, Sports Development Office, Student Publications Office, and the Student Involvement Office are all located on the third level. On the fourth level is the Center for Learning and Performance Assessment, and a dance room and multipurpose room for Physical education classes. On the top level of Solomon Hall is the Augusto-Rosario Gonzalez Theater, named after the parents of the late Br. Andrew Gonzalez FSC.

=== Angelo King International Center ===
The Angelo King International Center (AKIC or the CSB Hotel-International Conference Center) is a fully operational four-star hotel on a 2,100-square-meter lot at the corner of Estrada Street and Arellano Avenue, two blocks from the main campus. It was envisioned to be the first operational hotel school in the Philippines where students will be able to experience learning in a real-world environment. Groundbreaking rites for the building were held in 1996 but actual construction began in 1998 and was finished a year after. It was formally opened in August and named after De La Salle alumnus – Dr. Angelo King, who gave financial assistance to the construction of the building.

Sharing the space at the building is the Hotel Benilde, which has 46 guest rooms and two dormitory-type rooms, a conference hall, a fine dining rooftop restaurant and lobby lounge, a cafeteria, a library, transport services office, parking space for 126 vehicles, and two guest elevators. The first, second, eleventh, and twelfth floors are used by the CSB Hotel, and the third to fifth floors are for interior parking while the SHRIM occupies the fifth to ninth floors.

The School of Hotel, Restaurant, and Institution Management occupy four floors with 14 classrooms, a tiered demonstration kitchen, demonstration bar, institutional hot, cold, and baking/pastry kitchens with adequate cold and dry storage areas, two basic food laboratories, two computer laboratories, a nutrition laboratory, conference rooms, a clinic, and a chapel. The School of HRIM is served by two passenger elevators and one service elevator. Occupying the roof deck is Vatel Restaurant Manila, a fine dining restaurant operated by selected SHRIM students.

Near the AKIC building is the Solomon Guest House, which is operated by selected SHRIM students, who are involved in marketing meal preparation and service. The SGH also has three rooms and a suite that could be used as venues for private meetings and gatherings.

=== Design and Arts Campus – D+A Campus ===
The Design and Arts Campus (D+A Campus), formerly the School of Design and Arts (SDA) Campus, is a 14-story academic complex with 55,121.95 square meters (593,327.7 sq ft) of usable floor space designed by Lor Calma Design and Associates, with Eduardo Calma as the design principal. It was built on a 4,560 m^{2} lot that was formerly used as parking space for the college, located at 950 Pablo Ocampo Street, and about 500 meters away from the Taft Campus. It was originally planned to open in January 2006, but due to construction delays, the opening was moved to May 2007. It is the third, largest, and most advanced campus of the college which houses its largest and busiest school, the School of Design and Arts. While the exact budget for the building is classified, an estimated amount of 1.2 billion pesos was said to be allotted for the whole building project.

The building was dubbed by then De La Salle University System president, Br. Armin Luistro FSC as the "jewel in the crown of the De La Salle University System schools," as well as one of De La Salle's most ambitious projects. The building features an architectural design never before used, with a sophisticated façade and all-glass backside and designed in a way that only the floor from the tenth are visible. Calma relates that the building will feature louvers which, when illuminated at night, will appear like lanterns, and considering the location, the lighting effects would set the building apart from its surroundings.

The opening date of the building was moved to September 2006 when the January 2006 opening could not be achieved, but due to construction delays again, a September opening was not possible and the administration opted for a May 2007 opening instead. The building was delayed due to the intricacy of the architectural design, implementation of the complicated plans, and other problems encountered with the Project Manager and the Contractor. The architectural plans presented design issues that made them difficult to implement at a steady rate. The construction management encountered conflicts in approach and principles with the onsite technical team. Construction, however, gained a steady pace after October 2006 and the building was completed and inaugurated in April 2007.

The building has four floors of above-level parking space and ten floors of workspace served by two service and five-passenger elevators and five sets of stairs. It features a Building Management System with intelligent controls for air conditioning; smoke detection and fire alarms; CCTV surveillance security systems; and has its own sewage management plant. The building is also fully Wi-Fi enabled and the first building in the Philippines to be equipped with 10 Gigabit Ethernet. Among its notable facilities is a three-story, 558-seat theater which is cantilevered four stories above the ground and the Museum of Contemporary Art and Design, a 520-square-meter (5,600 sq ft) contemporary art museum which was envisioned to be the first of its kind in the Philippines. Inside, its corridors can double as exhibition spaces. Every classroom is air-conditioned and configured for better acoustics. The building also has a cafeteria, a chapel, and a two-floor library in addition to the lecture, computer, and seminar rooms. There are also video, animation, and sound production laboratories as well as a photography studio and a greenscreen TV and film production studio with motion capture equipment, and a 105-seat cinema.

=== Atrium ===
The Atrium is the newest building of the college. A 10-storey building, it was designed by architect Daniel Lichauco, the principal and managing partner of Archion Architects. It was constructed by D.M. Consunji Inc., a pioneer of advanced engineering technology. The new campus will house The School of Diplomacy and Governance, the School of Management and Information Technology, and the School of Professional and Continuing Education. Features of the building include an open-air cafeteria located at the topmost floor, and escalators every two floors that are designed to lessen the load of the elevators. The building also houses the Learning Resource Center dedicated to the students of the Benilde Deaf School as well as various departments, offices, conference rooms, initiative learning studios, and classrooms.

=== Aseana Campus ===
The Aseana Campus, officially known as the Delfin J. Wenceslao Jr. Campus, is the college's upcoming satellite campus in Aseana City, Parañaque. It is officially named in honor of the late president and chairman of Aseana City's master developer, D.M. Wenceslao & Associates Inc. Designed by architect Ed Calma to alleviate space constraints at the Taft campus, this will be a 3,845-square-meter (41,390 sq ft) facility is slated to open in 2027. Built with eco-friendly LEED standards in mind, the campus is slated to house the School of Environment and Design and the Analytics, Computing, and Infotech (ACI) Cluster of the School of Management and Information Technology (SMIT).

== Academics ==
Taft Campus

The college uses Howard Gardner's theory of multiple intelligences, where each person is said to possess varying levels of different intelligence which determine his or her cognitive profile. The theory is implemented through learner-centered instruction where classes are taught according to the student's understanding of the subject and recognizes the uniqueness of each learner. Learner-centered also refers to a learning environment that pays attention to the knowledge, skills, attitudes, and beliefs that learners bring to the educational setting.

The college has eight schools that offer degree and non-degree programs designed for the development of professionals in the arts, design, management, service industries, computer applications in business, and special fields of study.

=== School of Deaf Education and Applied Studies ===
The School of Deaf Education and Applied Studies (SDEAS) was first established in 1991 as a vocational program offering courses in accounting and bookkeeping for the Deaf. The vocational program became the School of Special Studies with the addition of the Bachelor in Applied Deaf Studies (BAPDST) degree five years later. The school was restructured and renamed the School of Deaf Education and Applied Studies in 2000. The BAPDST course was refined and began offering specialization tracks in Multimedia Arts and Business Entrepreneurship. The SDEAS is one of only six institutions in the Philippines that offer postsecondary education to the deaf.

In 2001, the SDEAS partnered with the Postsecondary Education Network-International, a global partnership of colleges and universities funded by the Nippon Foundation of Japan that aims to provide deaf students the appropriate postsecondary education for them to achieve their full potentials. Two learning centers were established since the partnership: The PEN-Multimedia Learning Center (2003) and the PEN-Learning Center (2006), both at Duerr Hall.

=== School of New Media Arts ===
In June 2002, Team St. Benilde under the Multimedia Arts program of the School of Design and Arts, has first taken the championship in the First Philippine Animation Competition with their entry, "Fiesta Karera", a fully 3D animated short of a futuristic rendition of carabao races usually held in festivals in the Philippines.

In 2022, following the new clusters split off from the School of Design and Arts (SDA), which was established in 1995, the School of New Media Arts (SNMA) consists of four Bachelor of Arts degree programs in Animation (ABANI), Film (ABFILM), Multimedia Arts (ABMMA), and Photography (ABPHOTO).

=== School of Arts, Culture and Performance ===
The School of Arts, Culture and Performance (SACP) consists four Bachelor of Arts degree programs namely, Creative Industries Management, (ABCIM), Music Production (BAMP), Production Design (ABPRD), and Theater Arts (ABTHA); a Bachelor of Performing Arts (BPA) degree program major in Dance (BPA-D), and a Bachelor of Fine Arts (BFA) degree program in Culture-Based Arts (BFA-CBA).

=== School of Environment and Design ===
The School of Environment and Design (SED) houses three Bachelor of Science degree programs namely Architecture (BS-ARCH), Industrial Design (BS-ID), and Interior Design (BS-IND); a Bachelor of Arts degree program major in Fashion Design and Merchandising (AB-FDM); and a Bachelor's (B) degree program in Textile Design (BTD).

=== School of Hotel, Restaurant and Institution Management ===
The School of Hotel, Restaurant and Institution Management (SHRIM) was established in 1996 and aims to provide the hotel and restaurant industry with graduates who possess the requisite knowledge, skills, knowledge, and values to become successful entrepreneurs and to train students to become "industry-ready" for hotel and restaurants in the country and abroad. It offers the Bachelor of Science degree in Hotel, Restaurant and Institution Management (BS-HRIM), which integrates theory and practice to provide students with a strong management and service orientation as well as a global perspective of hotel and restaurant operations. It has three tracks, the Culinary Arts track, Hospitality Management track, and Tourism Management track.

The school is housed at the Angelo King International Center, a four-star hotel school at the corner of Arellano Avenue and Estrada Street. Students are given their first on-the-job training at the Hotel Benilde regardless of their tracks. Students are deployed at either of its subsidiaries: the Solomon Guest House, a restaurant and lodge fully student-managed and operated, and the Chefs' Station, a food stall at the cafeterias of the college.

In 2009, the SHRIM partnered with the Vatel International Hospitality School in Paris. With this educational cooperation, the school is concurrently known as Vatel Manila and is included in the Vatel international network. Under the Vatel partnership, the school offers the Bachelor of Science in International Hospitality Management (BS-IHM).

=== School of Management and Information Technology ===
The School of Management and Information Technology (SMIT) offers degrees based on emerging profitable disciplines. It offers Bachelor of Science in Business Administration (BSBA) degrees majoring in Computer Applications (BSBA-CA), Export Management (BSBA-EM), Human Resource Management (BSBA-HRM) and Bachelor of Science degrees in Information Systems (BS-IS), Real Estate Management (BS-REM) and Interactive Entertainment and Multimedia Computing majoring in Game Development and Game Art (BSIEMC). The SMIT continues the college's Career Development Program by offering BSBA degrees in Business Management (BSBA-BM) and Marketing Management (BSBA-MM) as night programs for working students.

In 2005, the SMIT, along with the SHRIM, was given accreditation by the Philippine Accrediting Association of Schools, Colleges and Universities. In 2009, the SMIT partnered with the Singapore-based online graduate school Universitas 21 Global. Part of the agreement includes an elective in Electronic Business for the Computer Applications and Information Systems programs. Students enrolled in the elective will have access to Universitas 21 Global's resources, and will be trained by its staff.

=== School of Diplomacy and Governance ===
The School of Diplomacy and Governance (SDG) handles the general education curriculum of all programs offered by the college. It provides the students a strong foundation in the languages, social and natural sciences, theology, and philosophy. Until 2020, it offered the Bachelor of Arts in Consular and Diplomatic Affairs (CDA) degree to develop practitioners in international relations. In January 2020, SDG Dean Gary Ador Dionisio announced that the CDA degree would be replaced with the Bachelor of Arts in Diplomacy and International Affairs (AB-DIA) degree, while a new program entitled the Bachelor of Arts in Governance and Public Affairs (AB-GPA) would be offered, starting August that year.

The Consular and Diplomatic Affairs program has networked with various government (e.g. Department of Foreign Affairs, international and Philippine embassies and consulates abroad) and non-government organizations to provide the relevant exposure to students as well as to provide job opportunities to graduates.

Consular and Diplomatic Affairs program has entered into agreements with non-profit institutions like Alliance Française de Manille and Instituto Cervantes de Manila to provide the needed foreign language learning and cultural exposures to students.

Most of the professors in the CDA program were former diplomats, namely Rosario Manalo (former Philippine ambassador to Belgium, Sweden, France, and Special Envoy of the Philippines to the ASEAN Intergovernmental Commission on Human Rights), Minerva Jean Falcon (former Philippine Consul General to Toronto, former Philippine Ambassador to Turkey, Switzerland, and Germany), Antonio Rodriguez (former DFA Undersecretary, former Philippine Ambassador to Thailand), Franklin Ebdalin (former DFA Undersecretary and Philippine ambassador to Hungary), José del Rosario Jr. (former Philippine ambassador to India and Jordan), Monina Estrella Callangan-Rueca (former Philippine ambassador to Hungary), Luz Palacios (former DFA Assistant Secretary for European Affairs), and Marilyn Alarilla (former Philippine ambassador to Laos and Turkey).

Linkages were also created with different international institutions handling the Model United Nations Assembly (MUNA) abroad (e.g. MUNA USA, China, Switzerland, Germany, Hong Kong, Czech Republic, France, and Canada). Through this, students are able to attend the MUNA as official delegates representing assigned countries.

=== School of Professional and Continuing Education ===
The School of Professional and Continuing Education (SPaCE) provides post-baccalaureate diploma programs for graduates seeking continuing education in various business-related fields. Formerly held by the SMIT, the SPaCE now handles the Career Development Program (CDP) which offers BSBA degrees in Business Management and Marketing Management. The Career Development Program gives adult students the opportunity to gain a degree program while at work through a streamlined program and format which caters to their busy lifestyle.

== Athletics ==
The Benilde Blazers and Lady Blazers are the NCAA senior varsity teams of De La Salle–College of Saint Benilde.

The Blazers were formerly a member of the National Capital Region Athletic Association (NCRAA) before they were admitted to the NCAA in 1998. They then went on to win their first NCAA seniors basketball title in 2000, the fastest for an expansion squad.

The college's male juniors team are the Benilde–LSGH Greenies of La Salle Green Hills.

== Student life ==
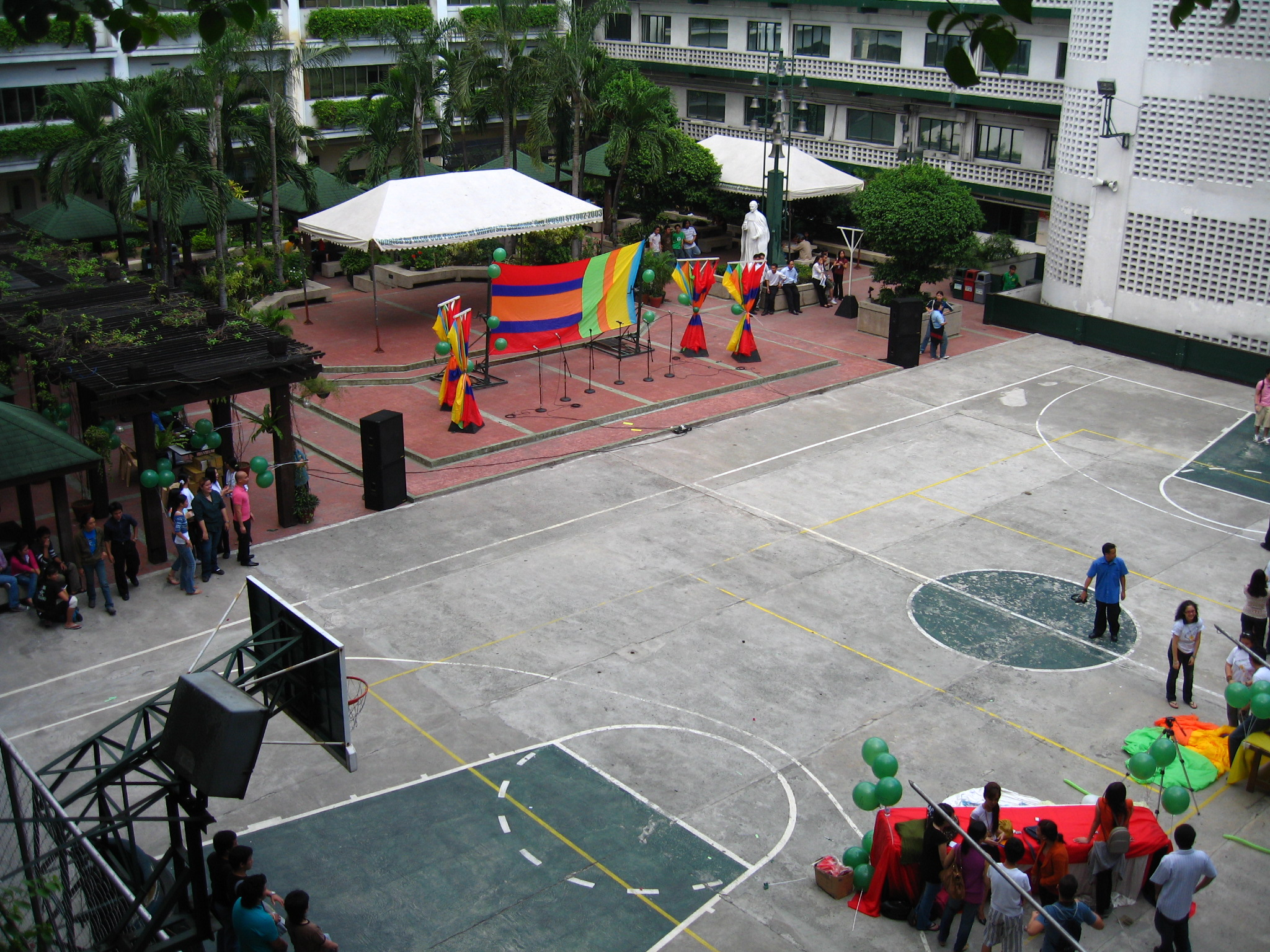
The Plaza Villarosa (outdated look) can be used for various activities

The college uses the trimestral calendar, where the school year usually begins in the last week of August. Freshmen students are required to attend the freshmen orientation program of the Department of Student Life, which is held a week before the start of classes. Freshmen students are oriented by upperclassmen about the school's policies, the facilities of the campus as well as what to expect during their stay in the college. In September, the Student Involvement Unit organizes the SI week (Student Involvement week), when the student organizations can recruit new members from the freshmen. The College Week is held during August, where the feast day of Saint Benilde is celebrated through various activities and several masses. Every Friday, a vacant period given from 11 a.m to 2:30 p.m., known as C-Break (College Break), can be used by organizations to hold seminars and workshops, training period for the performing groups, or to hold special events and activities. The Plaza Villarosa is usually used for activities, where the basketball court can be used for training sessions or sports activities, the performing stage for concerts, and the cabañas for bazaars.

=== Central Student Government ===
The De La Salle–College of Saint Benilde Central Student Government is the official student government of the college. It is composed of 35 officers and all enrolled students as members. It is categorized into the executive board (EB) and the School Student Governments (SSG). The EB is composed of six officers namely the President, Vice President for Academics, Vice President for Internal Affairs, Vice President for External Affairs, Vice President For Operations, and the Vice President for Finance, all of which are elected by the entire student body. The School Student Governments are composed of six officers namely the President, Secretary, Public Relations Officer, two Batch Representatives (One higher and lower), and the Frosh Representative (except for SDEAS), all of which are elected only by the students of their respective schools.

=== Student organizations ===
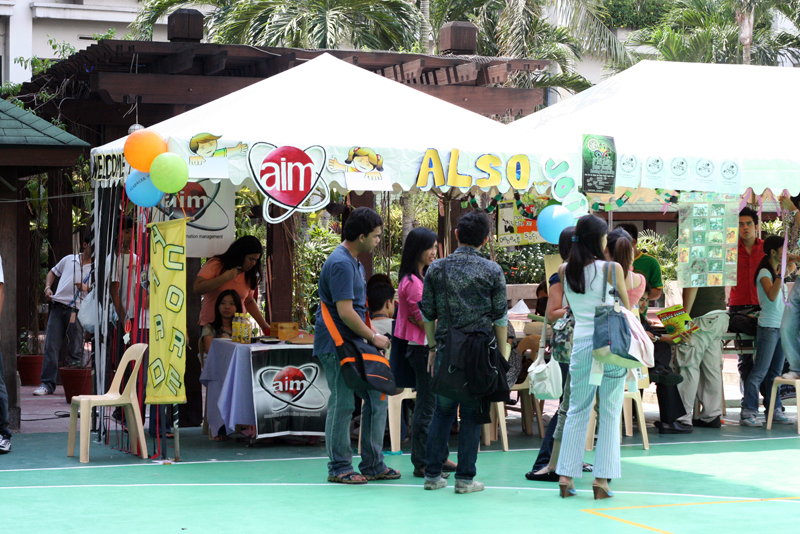
Student Activities Recruitment Week 2007

The college has organizations under the Student Involvement Office of the Department of Student Life. All recognized student organizations are members of the Council of Presidents, the mother organization which overlooks operations and project handling.

Professional organizations cater to a specific degree program. There are sixteen professional and profitable organizations which include the:

- AIESEC is an international non-governmental not-for-profit organization in Benilde that provides young people with leadership development and cross-cultural global internship and volunteer exchange experiences. Currently, AIESEC in Benilde is a Specialized Unit. (AIESEC SU DLS-CSB)
- Animotion is the professional organization of the AB-Animation Program.
- Association of Information Management (AIM) is the professional organization that protects, uplifts, and promotes the Information Systems program of the college. It establishes linkages with other social organizations and key departments of the college, and other organizations outside of the college.
- Association of Music Production Students (AMPS) is an organization that is dedicated to fostering the growth of musical aptitude and the appreciation of all types of music among the students of the Music Production Program.
- Benilde Arts Management (BeAM) is the professional organization of the AB Creative Industries Management Program (CIM). Primarily handling culture and arts based project management, BeAM aims to nurture creative industry managers who would bring together the entire creative ecosystem.
- Benildean Industrial Designers (BInD)
- Benilde Red Cross Youth Council (BRCYC)
- Benildean Deaf Association (BDA)
- Computer Business Association (CBA) is an information technology and business student organization.
- Export Management Society (EMS) is a professional organization that aims to develop future exporters and entrepreneurs who are Filipino in Ideals, professionally competent, and world-class.
- Game Developers Union for Innovation and Leadership Development (GUILD), the professional organization representing the Game Design and Development Program of the college. The organization provides venues for students to appreciate the many facets of video games from their creation to their consumption as well as showcase burgeoning local game development talent.
- Guild of Rising Interior Designers (GRID), the professional organization for the BS Interior Design program.
- Human Resource Management Society (HRMS)
- Hoteliers in Progress (HIP) is the professional organization of students majoring in Hospitality Management under the School of Hotel, Restaurant and Institution Management.
- Benilde Business Management Society is the professional organization of Business Management Students under the Career Development Program of DLS-CSB.
- Junior Marketing Association (JMA) is the professional organization of Marketing Management Students under the Career Development Program of DLS-CSB.
- Media Max (MMX)
- Students Collaborating and Reaching Out in Events and Arts Management (SCREAM)
- Travelers in Progress (TRIP)
- Vateliens in Progress (VIP)
- Chefs in Progress (CHIP)

Special Interest organizations cater to non-academic and special interests. Special interest organizations include:

- Christ's Youth in Action(CYA) a Catholic missional movement formed to evangelize and train youth for the service of the Church and society.
- Computer Link(COMLINK) is a special interest organization organizing student-centered programs and projects.
- Coro San Benildo is the resident chorale group of De La Salle–College of Saint Benilde.
- Debate Society (DebSoc) is the official debate team and organization of the college. The organization represents the college in national and international tournaments.
- Dulaang Filipino (DF) is the resident theater company of the De La Salle–College of Saint Benilde.
- Greenergy (GNY)
- International Student Association (ISA) is a special interest organization of De La Salle–College of Saint Benilde that aims to promote intercultural awareness, understanding, and a comprehensive association between Foreign and Filipino students.
- Kino Eye (KE)
- Optic View (OV) is a special interest organization.
- Silent Steps
- Societe Et' Cultura (SEC)
- Stage Production and Operations Team (SPOT)
- Saint Benilde Romancon Dance Company (SBRDC) is the resident dance company of the De La Salle – College of Saint Benilde.

An electoral body (a student government body)

- DLS-CSB Commission on Elections (COMELEC)

Publication organizations include:

- Benildean Press Corps (BPC) is the official student-journalists' organization of De La Salle–College of Saint Benilde. It is committed to provide relevant and legitimate information to the students as well as showcase their talents, skills, and creativity in upholding free and responsible journalism.
- Ad Astra is the official student organization of De La Salle–College of Saint Benilde that is tasked to produce the college yearbook.

Varsity organizations include the:

- DLS-CSB Green Pepper School Spirit Team
- CSB Fencing Team
- CSB Samahang Kali Arnis ng Benilde
- CSB Women's Football Team

==== Volunteer groups ====
Students may also opt to join the five volunteer groups directly tied to an office under the Department of Student Life. These include the volunteer groups:

- Benildean Student Envoys (BSE) are the student ambassadors of Benilde. They are professionally trained to represent the school. They handle the tours of guests, parents, students, and VIPs around the campuses of Benilde. They also usher in different events like seminars, conferences, theater plays, and the like.
- Student Trainers (STRAINS)* is the volunteer arm of the Student Involvement Office, which helps the office implement its year-long training program. The group is part of the planning, implementation, and evaluation stages of the unit's programs and projects. It assists in the implementation of the Frosh Orientation Program(Interaktiv), Frosh Solidarity Night (UNITE), team building of the different organizations, and student-development activities.
- Social Action Volunteers for the Center for Social Action
- Student Ministers for the Center for Lasallian Ministry
- Kaagapay for the Center for Counseling Services.

== Learning Resource Center ==
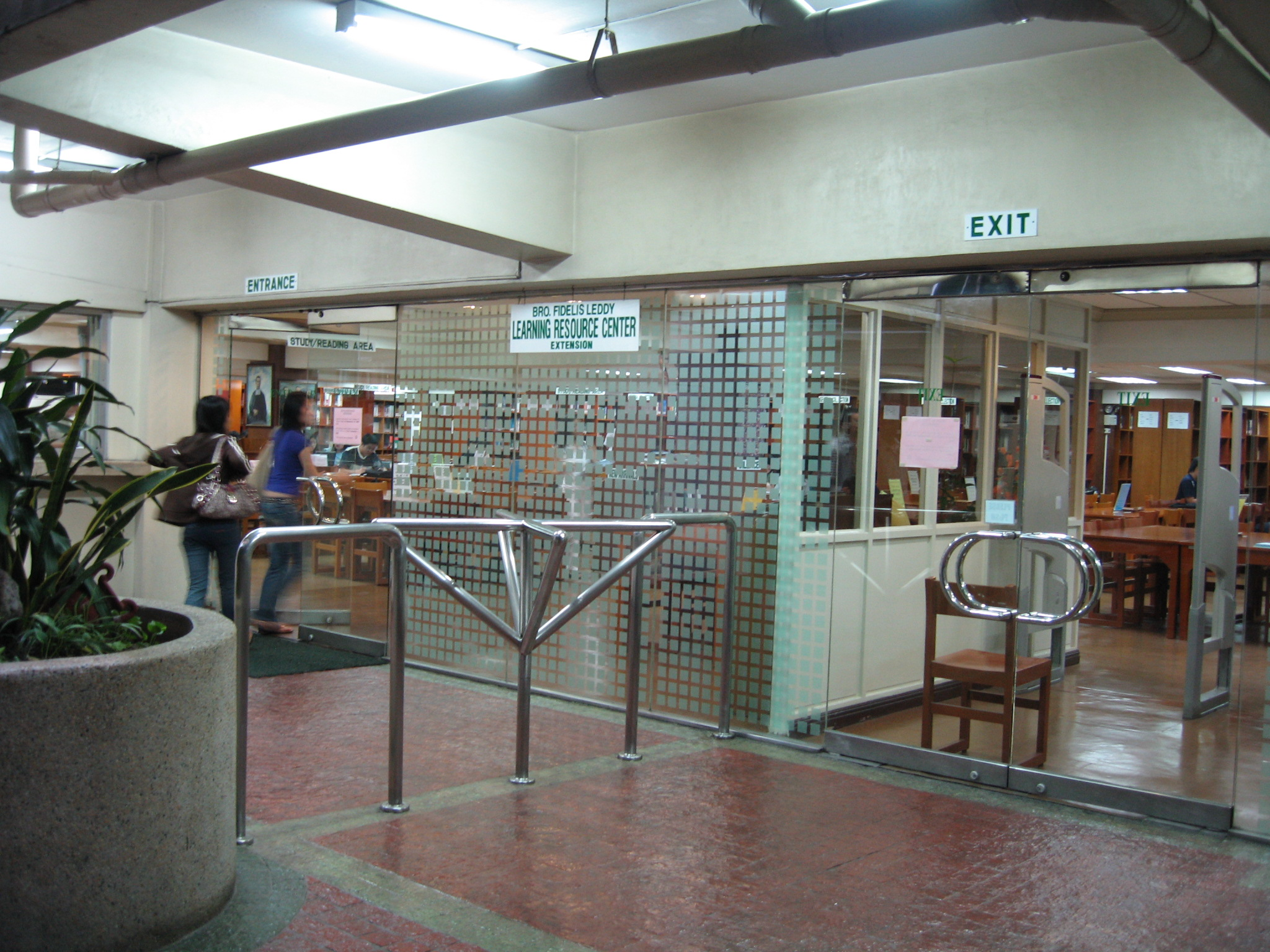
Entrance to the LRC-Extension (outdated look)

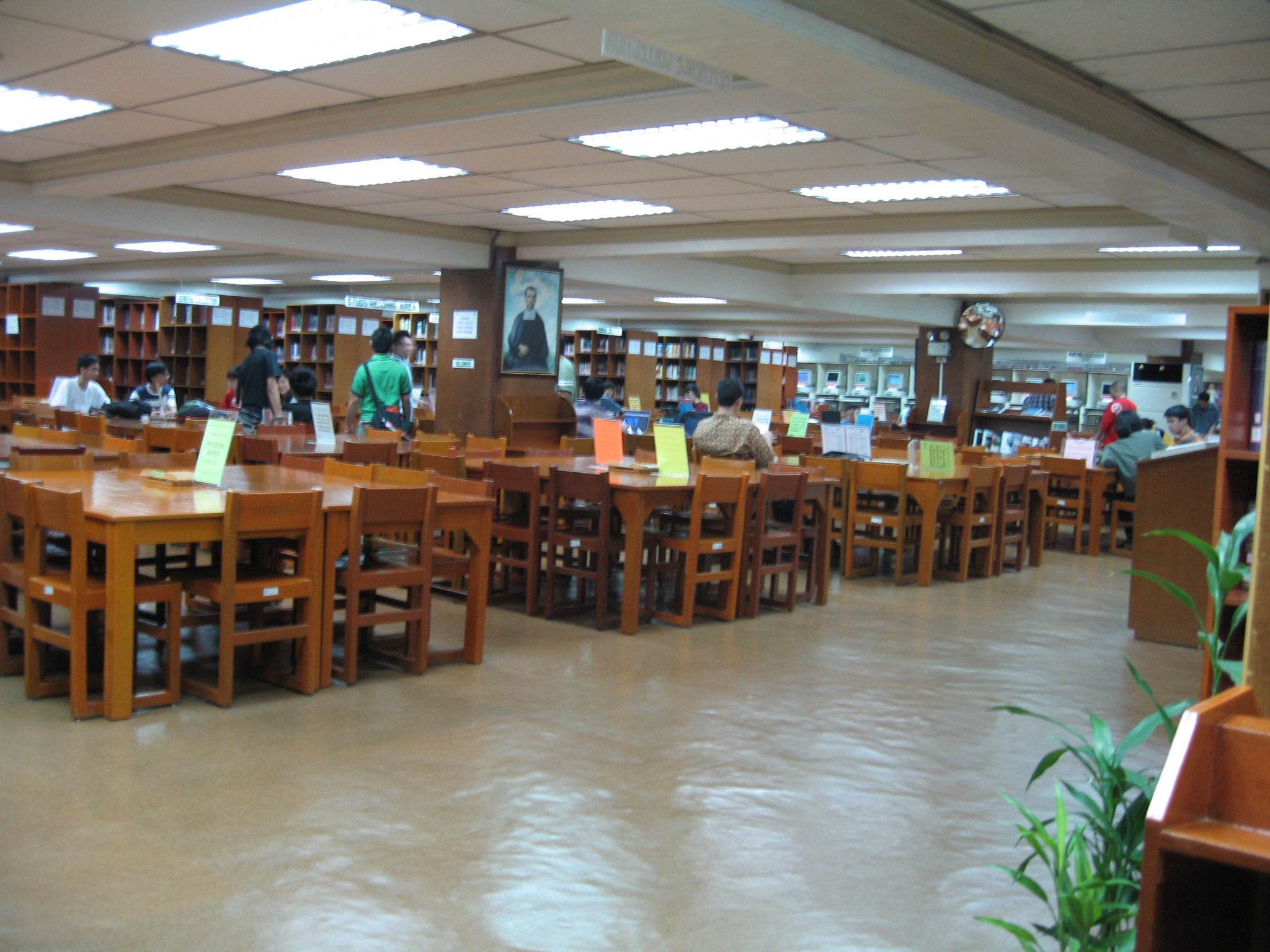
Reading areas of the LRC-Extension

The Br. Fidelis Leddy Learning Resource Center (LRC) is the multimedia resource center and library of the college. It provides access to conventional printed materials, such as books and periodicals, and other forms of storage media, such as transparencies, videotapes, compact discs, and other electronic/digital materials. The LRC's audio-visual equipment can be borrowed. The LRC has facilities on each campus. Each facility has separate audio-visual and reading areas.

Members of the De La Salle Brothers' community, De La Salle University-Manila alumni, as well as students and employees of De La Salle Philippines member schools, are authorized to use the LRC. Non-Lasallian users can be given access as long as they have a recommendation or referral letters from their respective librarians.

The LRC was first located at the Benilde Hall in a three-classroom setup. It housed a small collection of books and some audio-visual equipment. After the completion of the Mutien-Marie Hall in 1996, the LRC was moved to its present location on the second floor of the new building. It was named the Br. Fidelis Leddy Learning Resource Center, in honor of the longest living Lasallian Brother in the Philippines at that time, Br. Leander Fidelis Leddy FSC celebrated his 50 years of service in the country and his 60th year as a Lasallian Brother that year.

=== Facilities ===
==== Taft Campus ====
At the Taft Campus, the LRC is divided into two areas: the LRC-Main occupying the second floor of the St. Mutien-Marie Hall, up the stairway from the main entrance, and the LRC-Extension located underneath the Plaza Villarosa, which was formerly used as parking space. The LRC-Main holds the audio-visual equipment and multimedia resource collections, periodicals, as well as the memorabilia and thesis collections of the college. It has an audio-video listening and viewing area for the LRC's VHS collection. The LRC-Extension is an additional reading area where students can browse, borrow, and bring home books from the LRC's general book collections except for the Lasalliana collection which is for room use only.

==== AKIC Campus ====
The LRC in the AKIC Campus provides the learning resource needs of the School of HRIM, holding book collections and relevant periodicals for its students and faculty. The reading area can be found on the sixth floor of the AKIC campus. It has a floor area of 224 square meters, and a seating capacity of 100. The Audio-Visual Service Section can be found on the seventh floor and has a floor area of 105 square meters.

==== D+A Campus ====
The LRC in the D+A Campus occupies a part of the seventh and eighth floors of the building, housing the LRC's design and art book collection.

=== Collections ===
As of summer 2006, the LRC has a total collection of about 80,000 book titles (90,000 volumes), 4,657 volumes of undergraduate theses, more than 1,000 periodical titles (in print, electronic and microfilm formats), 139 titles of transparency-based library materials, more than 4,013 CD-ROM volumes, more than 2,562 commercial VHS tapes, 113 slide titles, 253 maps, 594 audio cassette tapes, 159 VCD titles, 107 DVD titles, 440 volumes of audio CDs, 7 titles of selected newspapers in microfilm format, and 5,000 volumes of in-house VHS tapes on campus activities.

Books found at the LRC-Extension and LRC-AKIC are grouped by collection: Reference, Reference Filipiniana, Filipiniana and General Collection. Each book is arranged by the Library of Congress Classification System. The LRC follows the revised Anglo-American Cataloging Rules 2 and the LC Classification System for cataloging and classifying books. The LRC and its extensions have Online Public Access Catalog stations for quick searching of books needed by the students.

The college subscribes to several online databases and electronic journals. Among them are ProQuest 5000 International, Thomson Gale, Global Market Information Database, Ovid PsycArticles Full-Text Journals, Emerald Database, and the Journal of Deaf Studies and Deaf Education. The database and journals can be accessed from computer units within the campus or at home through the online library facility at the college website.

== Official Publications ==
- The Benildean, the official student publication of De La Salle–College of Saint Benilde – Manila
- BLiP (Benildean Lifestyle, Interests and People) is the official features magazine of the college, which showcases the life and interests of Benildeans. First published in 2004, it tackles fashion, travel, and other topics.
- Karilyon is a magazine discussing Filipino lifestyles and issues. It aims to promote Filipino culture, language and ideals. It is published only in the Filipino language.
- Shades of Gray is a literary folio that showcases the literary talents of students. It is published once a year.
- Ablaze is a sports magazine released twice a year that provides an in-depth look into the personalities and perspectives behind Benildean sports and its athletes.
- Horizons is a design folio that trains students adept in the visual arts. It presents representations and images that are sometimes serious, sometimes light-hearted, but always thought-provoking.
- Dekunstrukt is a photo folio that showcases the works of students skilled in photography. It provides a venue for the college's student photographers to express and present their view of the people and the world around them.
- Ad Astra is the annual yearbook. It was first published as the Benildean Yearbook in 2000. Students are encouraged to subscribe to it one year before their graduation.

== Notable alumni ==
Notable alumni from the De La Salle–College of Saint Benilde include:

- Say Alonzo (BS-Hotel, Restaurant and Institution Management, 2005) – television personality (Pinoy Big Brother: Season 1)
- Phoemela Baranda (AB-Interdisciplinary Studies, 2001) – model and actress
- Zild Benitez (AB-Music Production, 2018) – musician (IV of Spades)
- Justin De Dios (AB-Multimedia Arts, 2018) – singer-performer (SB19)
- Albie Casiño (BSBA-Export Management, 2016) – actor
- Ken Chan (BS-HRIM Travel and Tourism Management Track) – actor, model, and television personality
- Yam Concepcion (AB-Multimedia Arts, 2010) – actress
- Serena Dalrymple (BSBA-Export Management, 2011) – actress
- John Vic De Guzman (BSBA-Human Resource Management, 2017) – volleyball player (silver medalist, 2019 Southeast Asian Games)
- Rita De Guzman (AB-Digital Filmmaking) – actress and singer
- Moira Dela Torre (AB-Music Production) – singer-songwriter
- Karen delos Reyes (AB-Photography, 2008) – actress
- Andi Eigenmann (AB-Fashion Design and Merchandising) – actress
- Dino Imperial (AB-Multimedia Arts, 2010) – actor, model, and radio personality
- Elisse Joson (AB-Fashion Design and Merchandising) – actress
- Kian Kazemi (BS-Hotel, Restaurant and Institution Management, 2006) – television personality and model
- Bianca King (AB-Digital Filmmaking, 2012) – actress, model and television host
- Carlo Lastimosa (BS-Hotel, Restaurant and Institution Management) – basketball player, former Benilde Blazer
- Champ Lui Pio (BSBA-Human Resource Management, 2004) – musician (Hale)
- Elmo Magalona (BS-Hotel, Restaurant and Instituion Management) – actor and singer
- Luis Manzano (BS-Hotel, Restaurant and Institution Management, 2003) – television host and actor
- Maxine Medina (BS-Interior Design, 2014) – actress and beauty queen (Binibining Pilipinas 2016)
- Maine Mendoza (BS-Hotel, Restaurant and Institution Management
- Mimiyuuuh (AB-Fashion Design and Merchandising, 2017) – internet personality, fashion designer
- Valeen Montenegro (AB-Fashion Design and Merchandising, 2013) – actress and model
- Robin Nievera (AB-Music Production) – singer-songwriter and record producer
- Sam Pinto (AB-Fashion Design and Merchandising) – actress
- Dominic Roque (BS-Hotel, Restaurant and Institution Management, 2011) – actor and model
- Jondan Salvador – basketball player, former Benilde Blazers
- Shalani Soledad (BSBA-HRM, 2002) – member of the Valenzuela City Council (2004–2013)
- Lala Sotto (AB-CDA) – chairperson of the Movie and Television Review and Classification Board (2022–present), member of the Quezon City Council (2001–2010, 2013–2022)
- Paolo Taha – basketball player
- Ena Mori – singer-songwriter, indie pop artist
- Nyoy Volante (ABTHR, 1999) – singer-songwriter and actor
- Lauren Young (BS-HRIM, 2019) – actress and model
- Megan Young (ABFILM) – actress and beauty queen (Miss World 2013)
- Ninong Ry (BS-HRIM) - vlogger and chef
- AC Soriano - content creator
