= Florida International University Tianjin Center =

University in Tianjin, China

School of Hospitality & Tourism Management, Tianjin Center
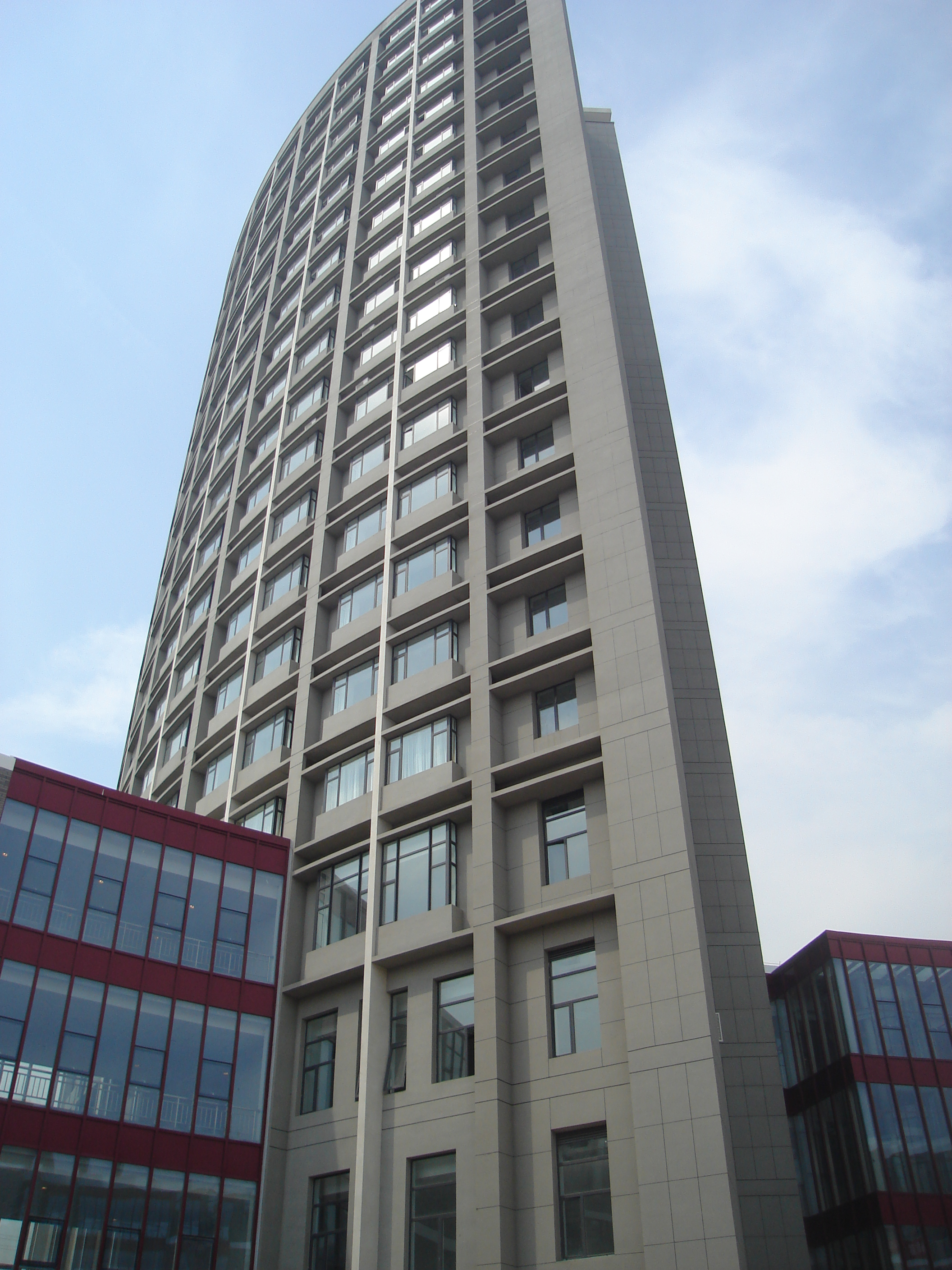
- Type: Public
- Active: 2003–2024
- Dean: Michael Cheng
- Students: 1,000
- Location: Tianjin, PRC; 39.178194°N 117.111694°E
- Website: hospitality.fiu.edu
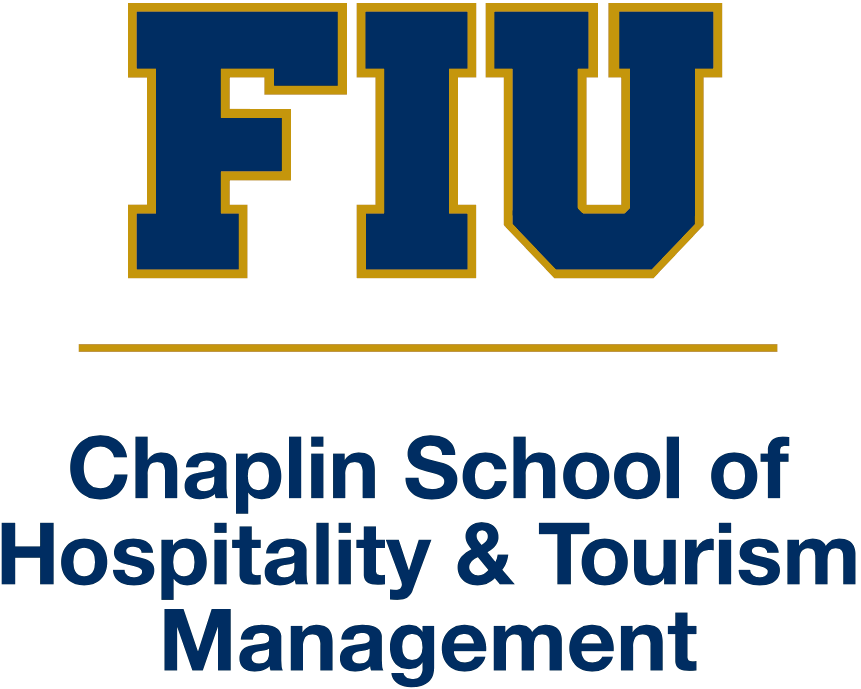

The Florida International University Tianjin Center, located in Tianjin, China, was a joint campus of Miami, Florida-based Florida International University (FIU), and the Tianjin University of Commerce ("TUC"), from which a branch of the FIU Chaplin School of Hospitality & Tourism Management operated. The center was constructed as a cooperative venture between FIU, TUC, and the local municipal government. The venture was entered into in 2003, and the institution was opened in the Summer of 2006. It was closed in 2024, pursuant to a Florida state law restricting institutions from having relationships with certain "countries of concern", including China.

== History ==
In 2001, FIU hired Chinese academic Peng Lu to pursue projects in China. By November 2003, it was reported that an accord had been signed between China and FIU, under which the Chinese government would build "a brand-new $20 million, 80-acre campus in Tianjin", with "facilities to accommodate about 1,000 students in the new hospitality program", for which business professors from China would travel to Miami to study for master's degrees in FIU's hospitality management program, in order to become the faculty of the new school, alongside some Florida faculty members. In May 2004, the official Signing Ceremony took place in Tianjin, PRC. Within the same month, the Ground Breaking Ceremony was marked by representatives from both Universities shoveling sand on the Foundation Stone. Construction was completed in 2006 and the FIU/TUC Ribbon Cutting Ceremony took place in September of that year. The inaugural class had 40 students. By 2010, the program had reportedly contributed to an increase in Chinese tourism to South Florida.

In 2016, the city of North Miami was criticized for the $47,500 cost of sending a delegation of six city officials to China to attend a graduation of students at the Tianjin campus, among other things. The COVID-19 pandemic in mainland China forced the closure of the campus by March 2020, with all FIU students from other countries returning to their homes to receive classes remotely. In 2021, the state of Florida enacted legislation to curtail state educational institutions with seven listed "countries of concern", including China. In 2024, FIU announced the closure of the program, to the surprise of some who considered it to be a particularly successful relationship. Students in the program at the time of closure were given the option to change majors and continue studying at TUC, or to transfer to FIU and attend its Miami campus.

== Facilities ==
The centerpiece of the campus is a 20-story housing facility which rises from the center of a long, crescent-shaped wing of a four-story academic complex, which combines with other wings to form a closed oblong structure. Housing is sufficient to accommodate the center's student population of 1,000, faculty apartments and U.S. student dorms. The 45,000-square-meter structure sits on 80 acres (320,000 m^{2}) of land. Per FIU's instructions TUC "designed and equipped the college with a first-class Western cuisine kitchen and a Western restaurant, a wine appreciation room, a hotel information technology center, a language lab, and a multimedia classroom".

== Faculty ==
Faculty are a mix of professors from China and professors originating from FIU. Chinese professors who teach at the school receive instruction at FIU's North Miami campus before being permitted to teach in Tianjin, and "spend a year to a year and a half... in Miami before they go into the classroom in China". FIU also requires Chinese professors to work for a time in the Miami hospitality industry during their studies.

== Students ==
Students who graduate from the Tianjin Center program receive two degrees, one from FIU and the other from TUC. Two majors are offered through the facility, these being in Hotel Management, and Tourism Management. All courses are taught in English. The school is open to FIU (Miami) students desiring to expand their educational experience to China.

The program started with 40 students, and by 2008 had 800 students enrolled. The first class of students graduated on May 5, 2008, and during the 2008 Summer Olympics in Beijing, the school undertook to "supply 540 volunteer students to the Olympic Village".
