= PEN-International =

Hearing impairment group

The Postsecondary Education Network International, known as PEN-International, is an international partnership of colleges and universities serving the higher education of students with hearing impairment.

PEN-International was founded by Dr. James J. DeCaro of the National Technical Institute for the Deaf (NTID) at Rochester Institute of Technology (RIT), with support from the Nippon Foundation in 2001, by two schools which have since been joined by three additional schools.

== Lead schools ==
- United States: Rochester Institute of Technology (RIT), National Technical Institute for the Deaf (NTID), in Rochester, New York.
- Japan: Tsukuba University of Technology (TUT), formerly Tsukuba College of Technology (TCT), Division for the Hearing Impaired, in Tsukuba.

== Partner schools ==
- China: Tianjin University of Technology, Tianjin Technical College for the Deaf, in Tianjin.
- Russia: Bauman Moscow State Technical University, Center on Deafness, in Moscow.
- Philippines: De La Salle–College of Saint Benilde, School of Deaf Education and Applied Studies, in Malate, Manila.
