= Esri Australia =

Esri Australia is a location intelligence consultancy company, providing services based on Geographic Information Systems (GIS) technology.

The company was founded in Perth in 1977, but has since expanded its reach across the Australia. Esri Australia has worked for many organisations, including several governmental sectors, such as defence, education, emergency management, environmental management, health, insurance, land management and planning, mining, renewable energy, transportation, and utilities.

In 2009 Daratech assessed Esri software products as having 30 percent of the traditional GIS global market share. In Australia, 72 percent of GIS users from all professions use Esri software.

== Ownership ==
Esri Australia is a subsidiary of a Singaporean engineering and technology company listed on the Singapore Stock Exchange. The second oldest established company in Singapore, Boustead celebrated its 180th birthday in 2008, and is the major shareholder of fellow Esri software distributors Esri Singapore, Esri Indonesia, and Esri Malaysia.
