= Tianjin University of Commerce =

University in Tianjin, China

- 天津商业大学
- Type: Public
- Established: 1980
- President: Liu Shuhan, Ph.D.
- Academic staff: 800
- Students: 30,000
- Location: Tianjin, China
- Website: www.tjcu.edu.cn

Chinese name
- Simplified Chinese: 天津商业大学
- Traditional Chinese: 天津商業大學
Transcriptions
Standard Mandarin
- Hanyu Pinyin: Tiānjīn Shāngyè Dàxué

The Tianjin University of Commerce (TUC; Chinese: 天津商业大学) is a municipal public university in Tianjin, China. The university is sponsored by the Tianjin Municipal People's Government.

The university was established in 1980. After two decades of construction and development, it has become an advanced university with undergraduate and postgraduate programs specialising in economics, administration, engineering, law, liberal arts, and science.

The university is located by the Ziya River in Tianjin and covers an area of 600,000 m2 including 500,000 m2 of teaching and dormitory space. The campus is clean and tidy with first-rate facilities providing excellent conditions for working, studying and researching.

== Academics ==
=== Accreditation and memberships ===
TUC is a member of SAP University Alliances.

=== Schools and colleges ===
The university is divided into 13 Schools (Management School, Economics and Trade School, Design School, Machinery Engineering School, Bio-Technology and Food Technology School, Law and Politics School, Information Engineering School, Tourism Management School, Foreign Languages School, Science School, International Education School, Advanced Vocational Technology School, Continuing Education School, Boustead College and 4 teaching departments (Basic Courses Teaching Department, School English Teaching Department, Physical Education and Health Teaching Department, and Ideology and Politics Teaching Department). The schools are composed of departments and teaching sections. The university has 12 Master's degree programs and 33 undergraduate programs, the enrollment of professional training graduates, undergraduates and postgraduates being over 15,000. The university has adopted a multi-level, multi-faceted approach to education.

The University offers advanced vocational technology courses, advanced self-study courses and various junior Schools, training and correspondence courses.

There are 300 professors, vice professors, research fellows, engineers, and 500 lecturers and assistant lecturers in the university.

=== Research projects ===
During the last 3 years, the university has taken 50 important scientific research projects at national or provincial levels, published 215 teaching materials and 3,000 theses, 20 of which have been cited by SCI. Nearly 100 staff members have exchanged their teaching or scientific achievements in academic conferences at home or abroad.

=== Library ===
The library of the university has a total building space of 10,000 m2 with a collection of 1,430,000 books in Chinese and other languages and 1,800 periodicals. The library can seat 1,000 people and there is also an electronic reading room, in which 12 databases in Chinese and foreign languages are available for teachers and students.

The new library is one of the biggest and most effective libraries among the universities in Tianjin. Journals such as the Journal of Tianjin University of Commerce, The Newspaper of Tianjin University of Commerce and Higher Education Research are published here. In the area of the construction of the branches of learning and specialties, the University centers on the need for economic development for business talents, takes the need as a basis to cultivate talents with sound basic knowledge, broad, extensive points of views on principles, and high quality. In 2003 the university enrolled the students according to the branches of learning and took the opportunity to make adjustments to the specialties and courses structures and enriched them. The university also improves the patterns of the talents' cultivation and provides a new platform for a people's all-round development. In teaching and scientific research, the University has set up a series of effectively managerial systems. A group of courses were appraised the excellent courses in Tianjin and many achievements were appraised excellent teaching achievements.

=== Additional resources ===
The University insists on opening up to the world to introduce its high-quality education resources. The University has established cooperative relations and made academic exchanges with 30 institutes of higher education in more than 10 countries and regions. They consist of the United States, Japan, Korea, France, Great Britain, Canada, Australia, Russia, Hong Kong and Macao. The University cooperates with Florida International University in providing a major in Hospitality and Tourism Management. The university and Eastern Michigan University jointly cultivate a masters program in Human Resources Administration. The Business Chinese Training Centre and Junior School of China Urasaki Tea Way have been set up and each year welcome many overseas students.

At the same time, the university sends teachers and students to study in the United States, Russia, Japan, Australia, Singapore in order to promote the university's internationalisation and to form an international education pattern of cooperating closely and developing together with good quality overseas education resources. In the 21st century, the university keeps the important thoughts of the "Three Representatives" as its guide; adheres to scientific development;handles carefully the relations between quality and quantity, profit and brand, development and stability; sticks to the idea of developing the university's undertakings by managing the school effectively and guaranteeing education quality; persists in the thinking of strengthening the University by building our important branches of learning into famous ones; makes full use of the comprehensive advantage of engineering, administration, economics, law, liberal arts, science and fine arts; keeps the market needs as its orientation; does its utmost to cultivate comprehensive personnel who can combine applied science with humanities, knowledge study with technology application, sound basic knowledge with profound specialty.

Tianjin University of Commerce is a distinctive, high-level industrial and commercial university with an area of 2,000 mu and a building space of 600,000 m^{2} with 30,000 postgraduate and undergraduate students specialising in economics, administration, engineering, law, liberal arts, science, fine arts, agriculture, and medicine.
