= Tianjin University of Technology =

University in Tianjin, China

Coordinates: 39°5′8.77″N 117°8′39.63″E

- 天津理工大学
- Motto: 重德重能、求实求新
- Motto in English: Focusing on Morals and Capability, Pursuing Truth and Innovation
- Type: Public, Technical
- Established: 1996
- President: Jing Hongyang (荆洪阳）
- Location: Tianjin, China
- Campus: urban
- Website: tjut.edu.cn

The Tianjin University of Technology (天津理工大学) is a municipal public university in Xiqing, Tianjin, China. It is affiliated with the City of Tianjin and funded by the municipal government.

The university was officially established in 1996. As an engineering based multi-discipline university, the university now has over 16,000 students, 988 teaching faculty and offers 45 Bachelor programs and 39 Master programs in areas such as science, engineering, humanities and management on 2 campuses.

== Colleges and schools ==
=== Technical College for the Deaf ===
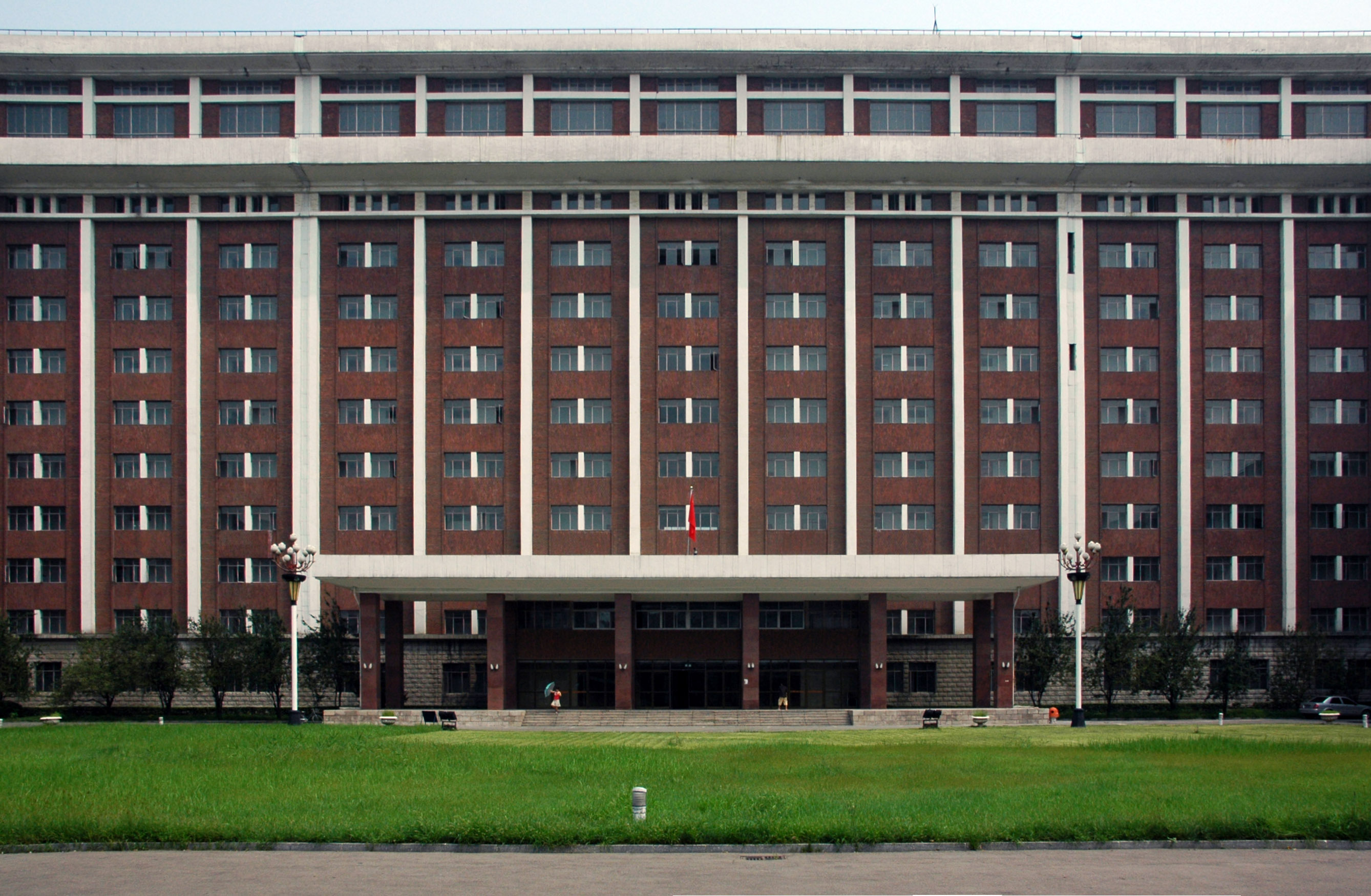
The front facade of TJUT from the West Gate.

Technical College for the Deaf (TUID, Chinese: 聋人工学院; pinyin: lóng rén gōng xué yuàn), Tianjin University of Technology, a principal member of PEN-International, is thus far the only college of its kind in China, and one of the most famous technical colleges for the deaf in the world. It has good cooperative relations with other technical colleges for the deaf in the world, such as National Technical Institute for the Deaf (NTID), Rochester Institute of Technology (RIT) in the United States, and National University Corporation Tsukuba University of Technology (NTUT) in Japan.

In its history of fifteen years, over 300 students have entered the society as teachers, architects, public officials in federations of the disabled, and internet management. In recent years, all of the college's graduates have found employment. In May 2006, its course of computer science and technology was awarded the title of Distinguished Major.

=== College of International Education ===
The College of International Education (CIE) at Tianjin University of Technology (TUT) is a school established especially for recruiting international students who want to study abroad in China. CIE offers programs in intensive Chinese language study (long-term, short-term, summer, winter courses) and degree programs in various fields of language, science, engineering, management, literature, art and law.

Apart from the courses for the Chinese language programs and degree programs, international students may also choose to take elective courses, such as Kung Fu / Wu Shu (Chinese martial arts), Chinese cooking, Chinese painting, Chinese calligraphy, traditional Chinese musical instrument playing, Chinese folk arts (paper cutting, carving), Beijing opera, etc., and take rewarding tours throughout China to experience the unique Chinese culture. So far, international students from more than 40 countries have come to study at TUT and we have productive cooperation with universities and educational institutions in many countries.

=== International co-operation ===
The University has signed an MoU with the University of Mumbai.

The International College of Business and Technology offers the following bachelor's degree programs:

Business Administration (in cooperation with Thompson Rivers University, Canada)

Logistics Management (in cooperation with Osaka Sangyo University, Japan)

In 2018, Punjab Tianjin University of Technology was established with collaboration.
