= Poggenpohl =

German kitchen manufacturer

Poggenpohl Manufacturing GmbH
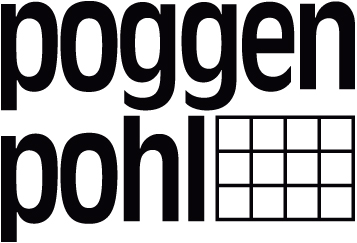
- Company type: GmbH
- Industry: Furniture
- Founded: 1892
- Headquarters: Herford, Germany
- Key people: Ralf Marohn (Managing Director)
- Products: Kitchen cabinets
- Website: www.poggenpohl.com

Poggenpohl is a German manufacturer specializing in kitchen cabinets. Its facilities are in Herford, Germany.

== History ==
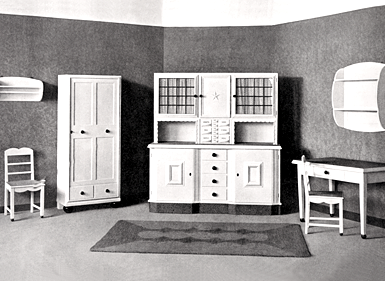
The Poggenpohl kitchen 1892

Freidemir Poggenpohl established Poggenpohl as a furniture company in 1892. He successfully introduced ergonomic work-top heights and storage innovations that improved kitchens.

In 1923, Poggenpohl introduced a free-standing commodious cupboard called The Ideal, which American cabinet manufacturer Kitchen Maid adopted. The Poggenpohl cupboard was the forerunner of The Fitted Kitchen in the "Era of the Commodious Cupboard.”

The company continued to create new products and techniques. In 1928, it introduced the reform kitchen, an innovative design, and it created the “ten-layer polished lacquer technique” in 1930.

In 1950, Poggenpohl launched the first unit kitchen, which had a modern design, continuous counter-top workspace, and matching wall units. As the product line evolved, traditional wooden knob cabinetry handles were replaced with inset "strip" laminate handles.

== Growth ==
In 1970, Poggenpohl authorized its first dealer in the United States, AV Kitchens (or AV Poggenpohl Studio) in Barrington, New Jersey. The company, led by Stephen Rabinowitz, imported Poggenpohl kitchens for more than two decades, cooperating with Poggenpohl Chief Executive Walter Ludewig.

In 1986, Poggenpohl formed Poggenpohl USA in Allandale, New Jersey, to facilitate communications and logistics of U.S.-based orders manufactured in German facilities.

In 2004, Poggenpohl introduced its first technology kitchen with entertainment and smart home features. In 2007, Poggenpohl introduced its first kitchen with Porsche Design, implementing the P'7340 - Porsche Design Kitchen.

In December 2016, the German Adcuram Group sold Poggenpohl to the Swedish Nobia Group. In 2020, the Jomoo Group took over Poggenpohl.
