= Tianjin Chengjian University =

University in Tianjin, China

- 天津城建大学
- Former names: Tianjin Urban Construction Institute (天津城市建设学院)
- Motto: 重德重能 善学善建
- Motto in English: Morality and Capability, Learning and Creating
- Type: National university
- Established: 1978
- President: Haili Bai (白海力)
- Academic staff: 1,374
- Undergraduates: 16,000
- Postgraduates: 2,000
- Location: Tianjin, China
- Colours: Chengjian Blue
- Website: http://www.tcu.edu.cn/

Tianjin Chengjian University (Chinese: 天津城建大学; lit. 'Tianjin Urban Construction University') is a municipal public university in Tianjin, China.

The university was established in 1978 as the Tianjin Urban Construction Institute and used to be a part of department of architecture of Tianjin University (Peiyang University). Now it has become one of the most famous urban construction universities in China. The city Tianjin is one of four municipalities directly administered by the Central Government of China, located south of and 120 km away from the capital of Beijing.

In 2007, Tianjin Urban Construction Institute passed the Higher Education College Teaching Level Evaluation and was renamed from (Chinese: 天津城市建设学院; pinyin: Tiānjīn chéngshì jiànshè xuéyuàn) to Tianjin Urban Construction (Chengjian) University in 2013.

== Disciplines and faculty ==
To serve the urbanization and urban modernization of China, TCU has constructed a mutually supportive, coordinately developing disciplinary system, consisting of six discipline groups of urban planning and architecture, urban construction, urban ecology and environment, urban economics and management, digital city, and urban culture. TCU consists of twelve schools, three departments for basic courses and one college for continuing education, with over 900 full-time teachers out of over 1,300 faculty.

== Programs and students ==
TCU provides 51 undergraduate programs in six disciplines of engineering, science, management, economics, arts and humanities. As a member of National Excellent Engineer Training Program, TCU offers project-based, skilled oriented a "trial run" for engineering students, to broaden their horizons, re-enforce their knowledge foundation, and enhance their capabilities. TCU provides 30 graduate programs for academic master's degree in three disciplines of engineering, science and management. In addition, TCU offers five graduate programs for professional master's degree in two subjects of engineering and landscape architecture. Currently, TCU has more than 17,400 full-time students, including 16,500 undergraduates and 900 graduates.

== Platforms and research ==
TCU has set up a series of platforms for scientific research, technological innovation and industrial cooperation, including one engineering research center of the Ministry of Education of China, and two key laboratories, three engineering research centers, one key research base for humanities and social sciences, one collaborative innovation center on green building of Tianjin Municipal and so on. TCU implements the strategy of ‘Research-driven development’, emphasizing fundamental research and highlighting specialties, which leads to the considerable increase in technological innovation and quality. The significant achievements include over 100 projects respectively sponsored by the National Basic Research (973) Program, the National Key Technologies R&D Program, and the National Natural Science Foundation of China and so on.

== Global engagement ==
TCU's partnerships and agreements cover more than 30 universities from four continents. TCU has obtained the approval of Ministry of Education of China for the joint undergraduate program with VIA University College, Denmark. Also, TCU, joining with The University of Adelaide, Australia, set up the Research Center for Disaster Prevention and Mitigation. TCU has international students from Russia, Singapore, Indonesia, Sri Lanka etc., who play an important role in enriching the intellectual and social life of the campus.

== Sports ==
In recent years, we have built a high-level and high-profile women's football team, and they won the second place of the Chinese University Women's Football Championship in 2012 and the third place in the Ninth National Collegiate games. 4 student athletes enrolled in the national team participated in the twenty-sixth World College Games women's football match and won the gold medal. In addition, in 2015, 4 student athletes also participated in the Canadian women's football World Cup as the main player of the Chinese women's football team and entered the top eight. The college students' sports competition has been awarded more than 200 items above the provincial level. Our school also undertook the ninth national college sports meeting women's football match and was awarded the advanced unit of the ninth national college sports meeting.

== Motto and goal ==
The motto of TCU is to ‘Morality and Capability, Learning and Creating’. The developing goal of TCU is to become a university with distinct characteristics and global perspective.

== Schools and departments ==
- School of Architecture
- School of Civil Engineering
- School of Energy and Safety Engineering
- School of Materials Science and Engineering
- School of Economics and Management
- School of Environmental and Municipal Engineering
- School of Computer and Information Engineering
- School of Control and Mechanical Engineering
- School of Geology and Geomatics
- School of Foreign Languages
- School of Science
- School of Software
- School of Continuing Education
- Department of Physical Education
- Department of Social Sciences
- Computer Center
