= Tiangong University =

Municipal university in Tianjin, China

Coordinates: 39.062150°N 117.105252°E

- 天津工业大学
- Seal of the University since 2019
- Other name: Tianjin Industrial University (lit. meaning)
- Former names: Tianjin Polytechnic University (2000–2019); Tianjin Economic Management Cadre College (1983–2000); Tianjin Textile Institute (1968–2000); Hebei Textile Institute (1958–1968)
- Type: Public research university
- Established: 1958; 68 years ago (as Hebei Textile Institute)
- Affiliations: Tianjin Municipal Education Commission
- President: Xia Changliang
- Academic staff: 2,700
- Students: 30,000
- Location: Tianjin, China
- Website: tiangong.edu.cn en.tiangong.edu.cn

Tiangong University (天津工业大学), formerly known as Tianjin Polytechnic University is a municipal public university in Xiqing district, Tianjin, China. It is affiliated with the City of Tianjin and sponsored by the Tianjin Municipal People's Government. The university is part of the Double First-Class Construction.

The university was first established in 1958 as Hebei Textile Institute . After several reorganizations, the university finally renamed to its current Chinese name in 2000. The English name used by the university from 2000 to 2019 was Tianjin Polytechnic University, despite the consistency of its Chinese name.

The university comprises 5 academic divisions, 29 schools, 1 residential college, and 2 affiliated hospitals. It currently enrolls over 19,000 undergraduates, more than 6,500 master's students (including over 5,900 full-time students), over 900 doctoral students, and more than 800 students in adult education programs. Additionally, the university hosts over 2,300 international students.

== Faculty of Science ==
- School of Mathematics Science
- School of Physical Science&Technology
- School of Chemistry

== Faculty of Engineering ==
- School of Textile Science and Engineering
- School of Material Science and Engineering
- School of Chemical Engineering andTechnology
- School of Environmental Science&Engineering
- School of Mechanical Engineering
- School of Aerospace Engineering

== Faculty of Information Sciences ==
- School of Electrical Engineering
- School of Artificial Intelligence
- School of Computer Science&Technology
- School of Electronics and Information Engineering/School of Integrated Circuits
- School of Software
- School of Control Science and Engineering

== Faculty of Humanities and Social Sciences ==
- School of Arts
- School of Economics&Management
- School of Humanities
- School of Law / Intellectual Property
- School of Marxism
- BOYA College

== Faculty of Biomedical Sciences ==
- School of Life Sciences
- School of Pharmacy
