= List of Leni Robredo 2022 presidential campaign endorsements =

This is a list of notable individuals and organizations who endorsed Leni Robredo, her running mate Francis Pangilinan, or both of them in their campaign to be elected President and Vice President of the Philippines, respectively, in the 2022 election.

== Political endorsements ==
=== Presidents ===
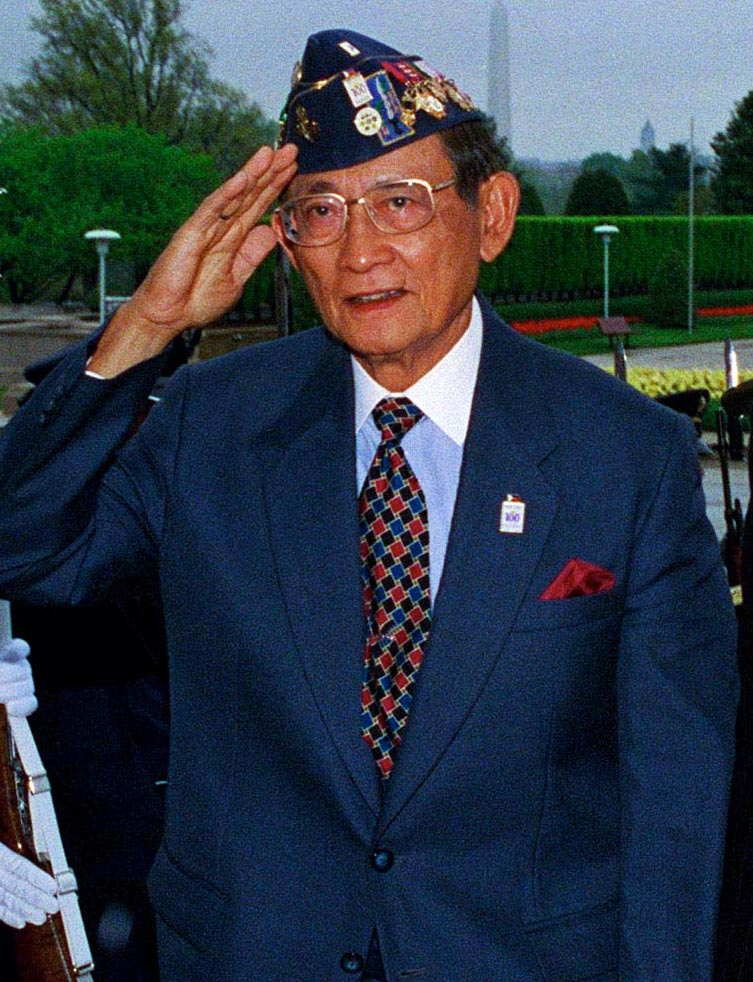
Fidel V. Ramos

- Fidel V. Ramos, 12th President of the Philippines (1992–1998)

=== Cabinet-level officials ===
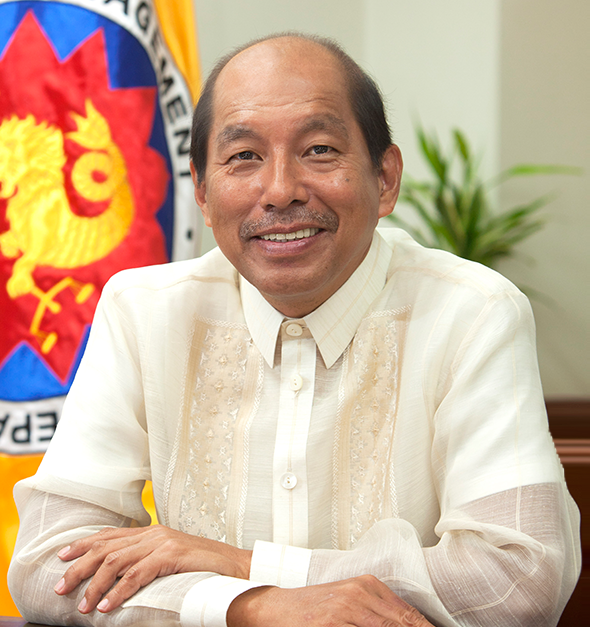
Florencio Abad

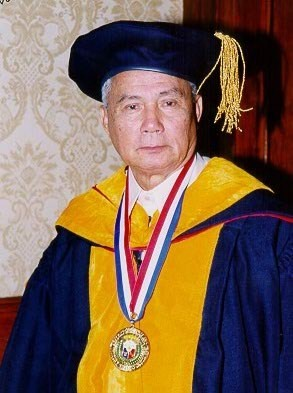
Angel Alcala

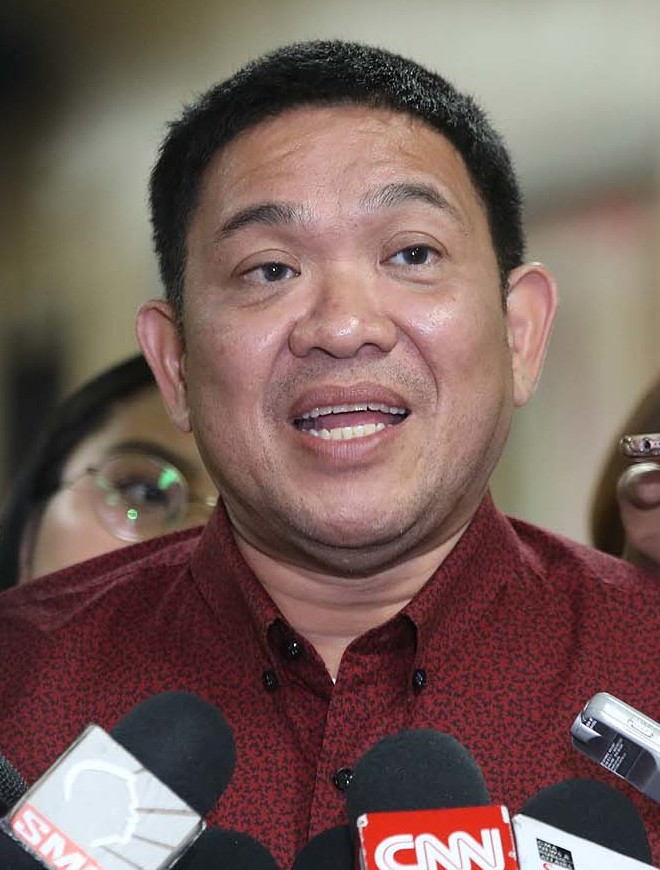
Rolando Andaya Jr.

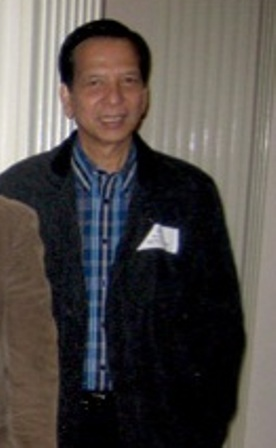
Ignacio Bunye

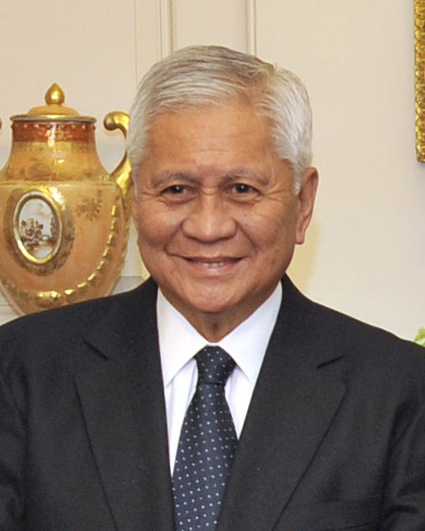
Albert del Rosario

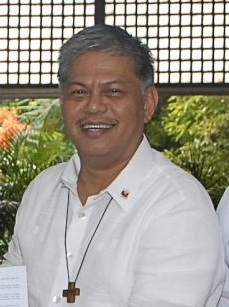
Armin Luistro

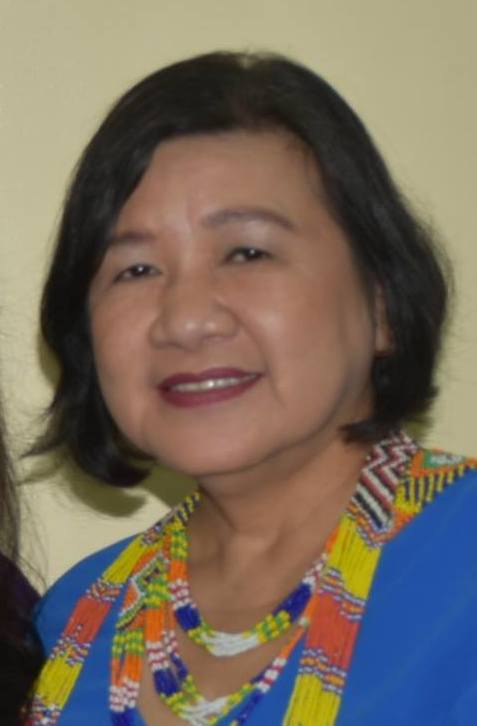
Liza Maza

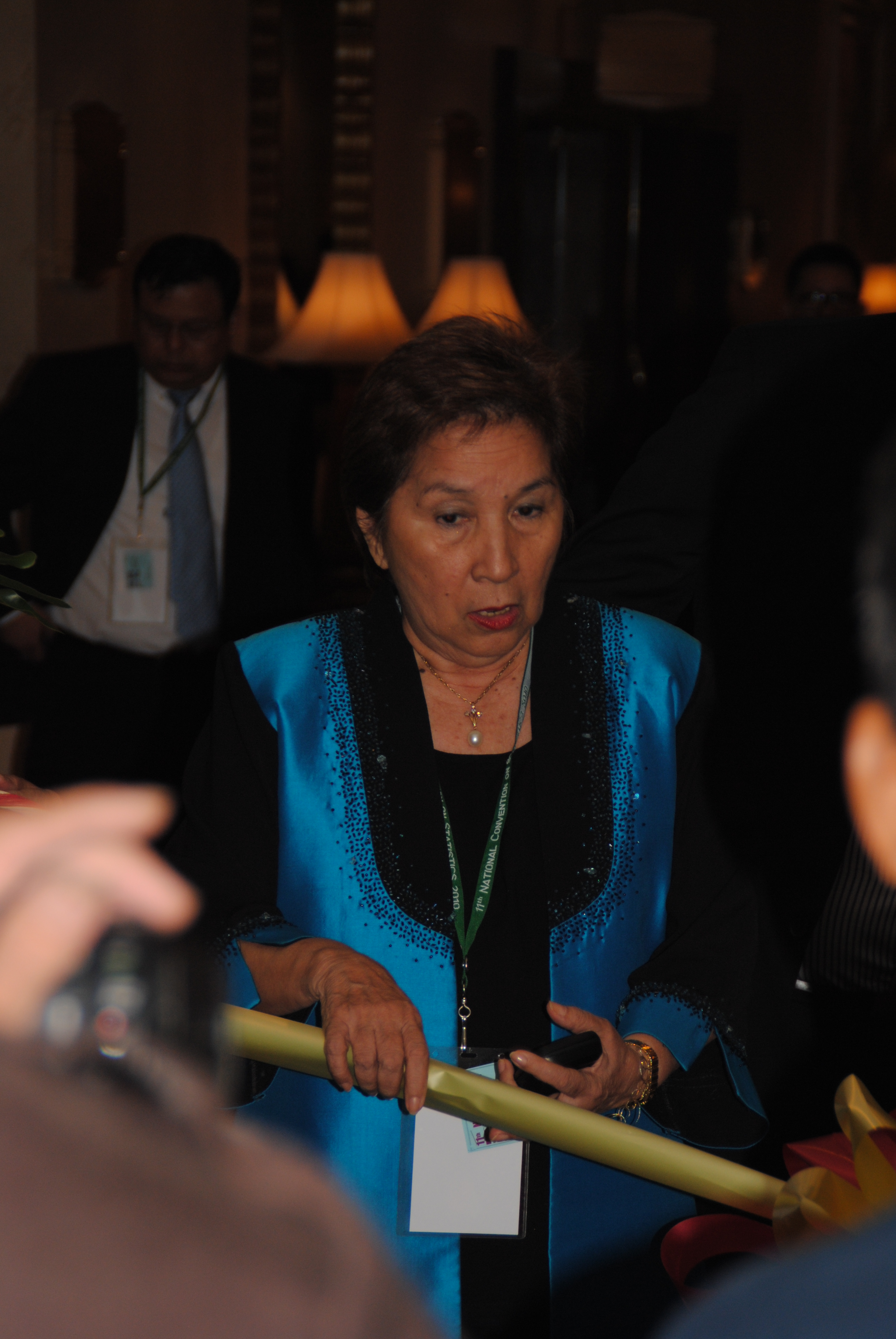
Solita Monsod

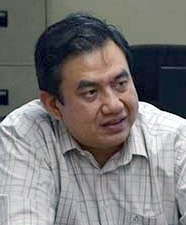
Thomas Orbos

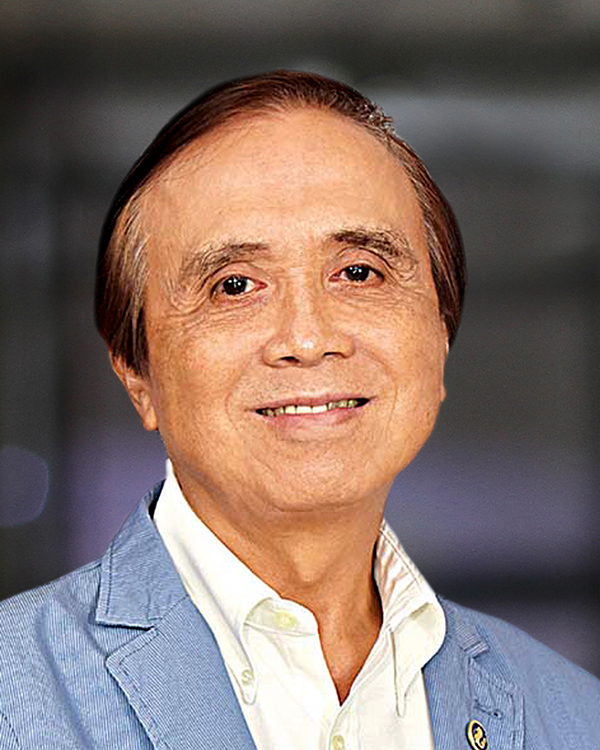
Ernesto Pernia

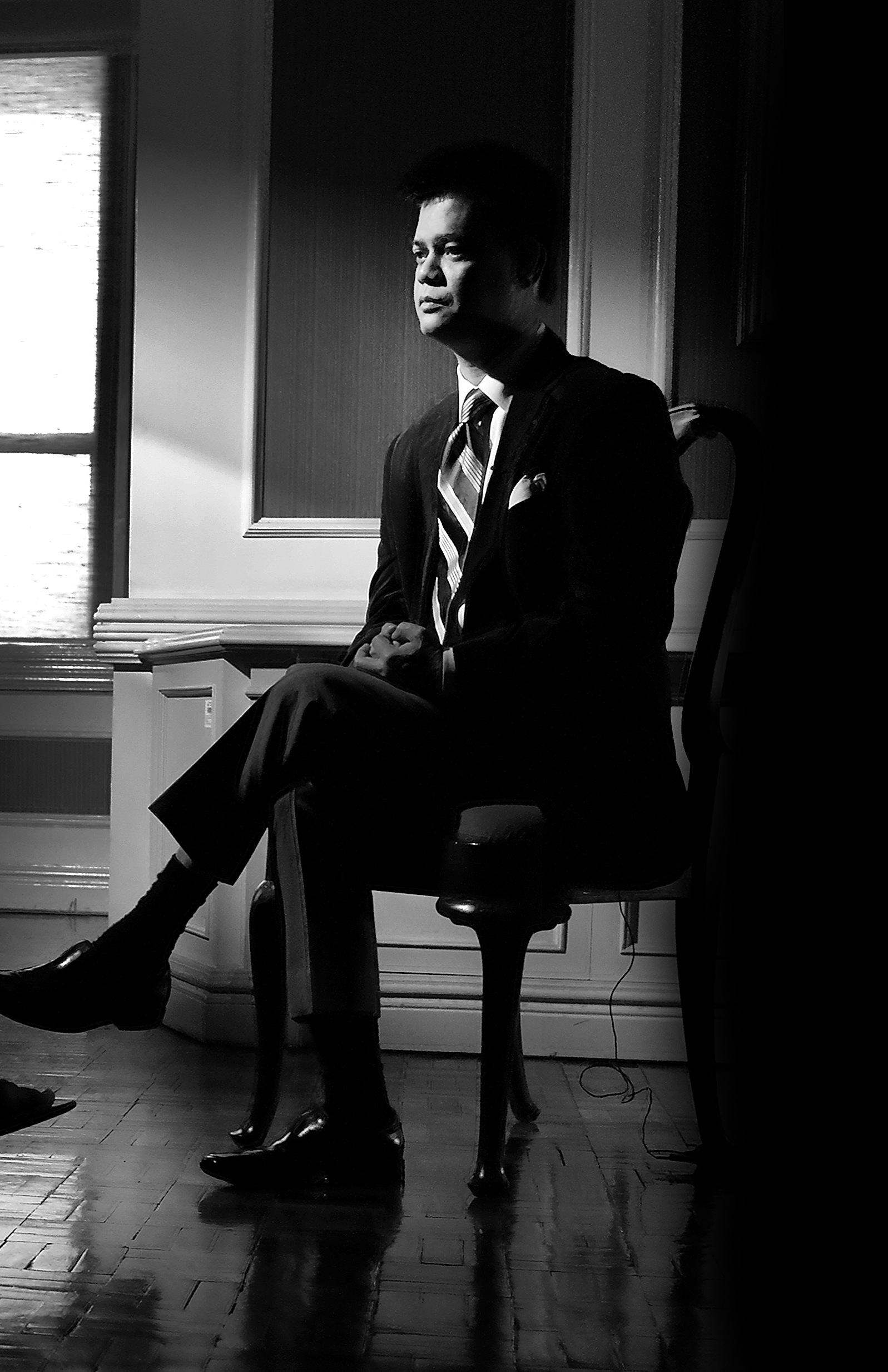
Manolo Quezon

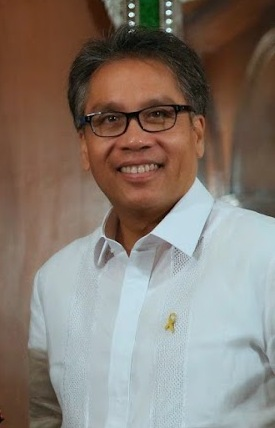
Mar Roxas

- Julia Abad, Director-General of the Presidential Management Staff (2010–2016)
- Florencio Abad, Secretary of Budget and Management (2010–2016), Secretary of Education (2004–2005), Secretary of Agrarian Reform (1989–1990), Batanes representative (1987–1989, 1995–2004)
- Jun Abaya, Secretary of Transportation and Communications (2012–2016), Cavite's 1st district representative (2004–2012), great-grandson of President Emilio Aguinaldo
- Nereus Acosta, Presidential Adviser for Environmental Protection (2011–2016), General Manager of the Laguna Lake Development Authority (2011–2016), Bukidnon's 1st district representative (1998–2007), Bukidnon Provincial Board member (1995–1998)
- Silvestre Afable, Jr., Press Secretary (2002)
- Estrella F. Alabastro, Secretary of Science and Technology (2001–2010)
- Delia Albert, Secretary of Foreign Affairs (2003–2004), Philippine Ambassador to Australia (1995–2002), Philippine Ambassador to Germany (2005–2010)
- Angel Alcala, Secretary of Environment and Natural Resources (1992–1995), Chairperson of the Commission on Higher Education (1995–1999), National Scientist of the Philippines
- Proceso Alcala, Secretary of Agriculture (2010–2016), Quezon's 2nd district representative (2004–2010)
- Jose Rene Almendras, Secretary of Energy (2010–2012), Cabinet Secretary (2012–2016), Acting Secretary of Foreign Affairs (2016)
- Rolando Andaya Jr., Secretary of Budget and Management (2006–2010), Camarines Sur's 1st district representative (1998–2006, 2010–2019), House Deputy Speaker (2016–2018), House Majority Leader (2018–2019)
- Luwalhati Antonino, Chairperson of the Mindanao Development Authority (2010–2016), South Cotabato's 1st district representative (1992–2001), co-founder of the Achievers with Integrity Movement
- Senen C. Bacani, Secretary of Agriculture (1990–1992)
- Rosalinda Baldoz, Secretary of Labor and Employment (2010–2016), Administrator of the Philippine Overseas Employment Administration (2001–2010)
- Alfredo Bengzon, Secretary of Health (1986–1992)
- Jose S. Brillantes, Secretary of Labor and Employment (1995–1996)
- Ignacio Bunye, Press Secretary (2002–2003, 2004–2008), Chairperson of the Metropolitan Manila Development Authority (1991–1992), Muntinlupa representative (1998–2001), Mayor of Muntinlupa, Metro Manila (1986–1987, 1988)
- Esperanza Cabral, Secretary of Health (2009–2010), Secretary of Social Welfare and Development (2005–2009)
- Dante Canlas, Director-General of the National Economic and Development Authority (1998–2001), economist
- Emmanuel Caparas, Secretary of Justice (2016)
- Ricky Carandang, Secretary of the Presidential Communications Development and Strategic Planning Office (2010–2013), former broadcast journalist
- Cesar Sarino, Secretary of Interior and Local Government (1991–1992)
- Nieves Confesor, Secretary of Labor and Employment (1992–1995)
- Adrian Cristobal Jr, Secretary of Trade and Industry (2015–2016)
- Avelino J. Cruz Jr., Secretary of National Defense (2004–2006), former president of the Philippine Bar Association
- Gemma Cruz-Araneta, Secretary of Tourism (1998–2001), beauty queen (Miss International 1964 winner), writer
- Manuel Dayrit, Secretary of Health (2001–2005)
- Teresita Quintos Deles, Presidential Adviser on the Peace Process (2003–2005, 2010–2016)
- Edilberto de Jesus, Secretary of Education (2002–2004)
- Edicio dela Torre, Director-General of the Technical Education and Skills Development Authority (1998–2001), activist, educator
- Benjamin de Leon, Presidential Assistant (1992–1998)
- Virgilio de los Reyes, Secretary of Agrarian Reform (2010–2016)
- Albert del Rosario, Secretary of Foreign Affairs (2011–2016), Philippine Ambassador to the United States (2001–2006)
- Ramon Del Rosario Jr., Secretary of Finance ad interim (1992–1993)
- Gregory Domingo, Secretary of Trade and Industry (2010–2015)
- Emmanuel Esguerra, Director-General of the National Economic and Development Authority (2016)
- Jaime Galvez Tan, Secretary of Health (1995)
- Cesar Garcia, National Security Adviser (2010–2016), former director-general of the National Intelligence Coordinating Agency
- Ester Garcia, former chairperson of the Commission on Higher Education
- Voltaire Gazmin, Secretary of National Defense (2010–2016), Philippine Ambassador to Cambodia (2002–2004), Commanding General of the Philippine Army (1999–2000), Commander of the Presidential Security Group (1986–1992)
- Ernesto Garilao, Secretary of Agrarian Reform (1992–1998)
- Barry Gutierrez, Spokesperson of the Office of the Vice President of the Philippines (2016–present), Akbayan party-list representative (2013–2016), spokesperson for the Leni Robredo 2022 presidential campaign
- Cielito Habito, Director-General of the National Economic and Development Authority (1992–1998), economist
- Fe A. Hidalgo, Secretary of Education officer-in-charge (2005–2006)
- Florin Hilbay, Solicitor General of the Philippines (2014–2016)
- Lina Laigo, Secretary of Social Welfare and Development (1995–1998)
- Jesli Lapus, Secretary of Trade and Industry (2010), Secretary of Education (2006–2010), Tarlac's 3rd district representative (1998–2006), uncle of President Benigno Aquino III
- Delfin Lazaro, Secretary of Energy (1993–1994)
- Edwin Lacierda, Presidential Spokesperson (2010–2016)
- Patricia Licuanan, Chairperson of the Commission on Higher Education (2010–2018), Chairperson of the National Commission on the Role of Filipino Women
- Alberto Lim, Secretary of Tourism (2010–2011)
- Narzalina Lim, Secretary of Tourism (1992)
- Armin Luistro, Secretary of Education (2010–2016), president of De La Salle University (2006–2010), member of the De La Salle Brothers
- Rafael V. Mariano, Secretary of Agrarian Reform ad interim (2016–2017), Anakpawis party-list representative (2004–2013)
- Liza Maza, Lead Convenor of the National Anti-Poverty Commission (2016–2018), Bayan Muna party-list representative (2001–2004), Gabriela party-list representative (2004–2010)
- Solita Monsod, Director-General of the National Economic and Development Authority (1986–1989), economist
- Mario Montejo, Secretary of Science and Technology (2010–2016)
- Edmundo Mir, Secretary of Public Works and Highways (1993)
- Imelda M. Nicolas, Chairperson of the Commission on Filipinos Overseas (2010–2016), Secretary-General of the National Anti-Poverty Commission (2004–2005), Chairperson of the National Commission on the Role of Filipino Women (1993–1998)
- Thomas Orbos, Chairperson of the Metropolitan Manila Development Authority officer-in-charge (2016–2017), General Manager of the Metropolitan Manila Development Authority (2016–2018), Assistant General Manager for Planning of the Metropolitan Manila Development Authority (2014–2016) (previously endorsed Isko Moreno)
- Ramón Paje, Secretary of Environment and Natural Resources (2010–2016)
- Ernesto Pernia, Director-General of the National Economic and Development Authority (2016–2020), economist
- Manolo Quezon, Secretary of the Presidential Communications Development and Strategic Planning Office officer-in-charge (2014–2016), grandson of President Manuel L. Quezon
- Victor Ramos, Secretary of Environment and Natural Resources (1995–1998)
- Joel Rocamora, Lead Convenor of the National Anti-Poverty Commission (2010–2016), political analyst, civil society leader
- Carmencita Reodica, Secretary of Health (1996–1998)
- Roberto Romulo, Secretary of Foreign Affairs (1992–1995) (deceased)
- Etta Rosales, Chairperson of the Commission on Human Rights (2010–2015), Akbayan party-list representative (1998–2007), activist
- Mar Roxas, Secretary of the Interior and Local Government (2012–2015), Secretary of Transportation and Communications (2011–2012), Secretary of Trade and Industry (2000–2003), 2010 vice presidential candidate under the Liberal Party, Senator of the Philippines (2004–2010), Capiz's 1st district representative (1993–2000), grandson of President Manuel Roxas, Leni Robredo's running mate in 2016
- Mel Senen Sarmiento, Secretary of the Interior and Local Government (2015–2016), Samar's 1st district representative (2010–2015), Mayor of Calbayog, Samar (2001–2010), Vice Mayor of Calbayog (1992–1995)
- Rogelio Singson, Secretary of Public Works and Highways (2010–2016)
- Ismael Sueno, Secretary of the Interior and Local Government (2016–2017), Governor of South Cotabato (1986–1992), Mayor of Koronadal, South Cotabato (1980–1986), Chairman of PDP–Laban (2014–2016), 1998 vice presidential candidate
- Judy Taguiwalo, Secretary of Social Welfare and Development ad interim (2016–2017)
- Paulyn Ubial, Secretary of Health ad interim (2016–2017)
- Mona D. Valisno, Secretary of Education (2010)
- Abigail Valte, Deputy Presidential Spokesperson (2010–2016)

=== National-level executive officials and civil servants ===
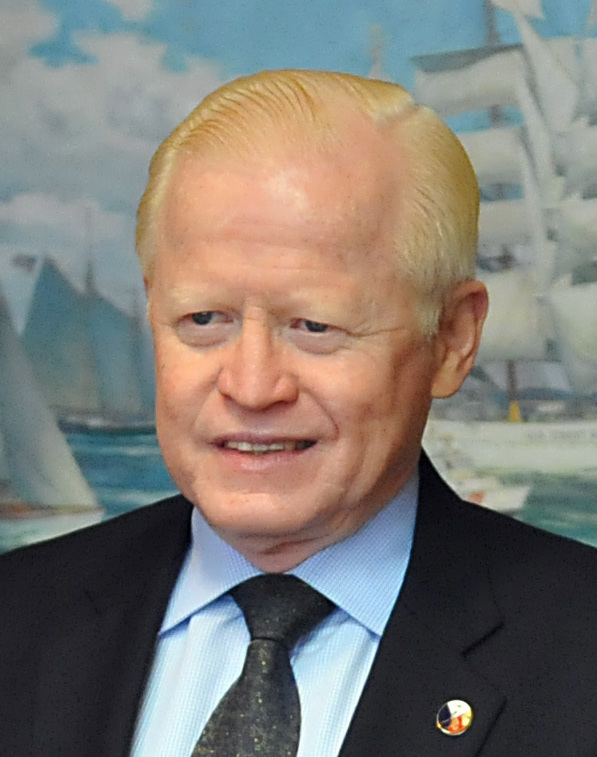
Jose L. Cuisia Jr.

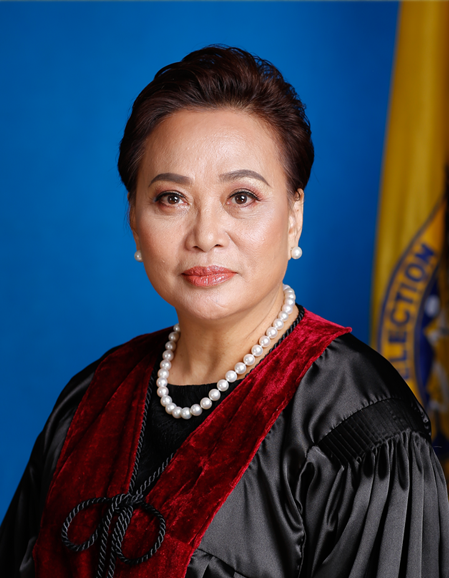
Rowena Guanzon

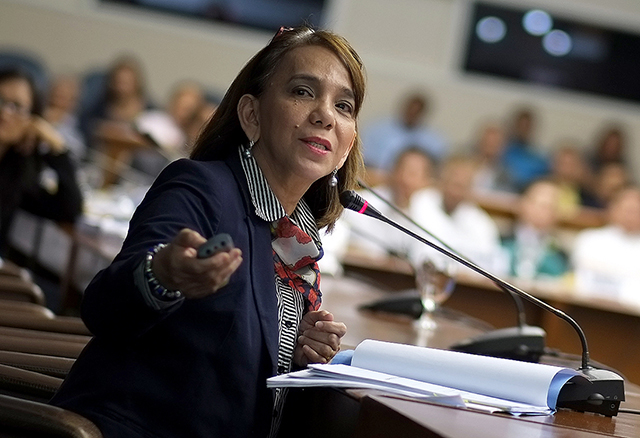
Heidi Mendoza

- Peter Abaya, CEO and General Manager of the Philippine Reclamation Authority (2010–2016) and great-grandson of President Emilio Aguinaldo
- Tomas Africa, former National Statistics Office administrator
- Zorayda Amelia Alonzo, President of the Home Development Mutual Fund (1989–1999)
- Victoria Avena, Commissioner of the Presidential Commission on Good Government (2001–2004)
- Rene G. Bañez, Commissioner of the Bureau of Internal Revenue (2001–2002)
- Ma. Regina Bautista-Martin, Administrator of the Sugar Regulatory Administration (2010–2016)
- Yasmin Busran–Lao, former chairperson of the National Commission of Muslim Filipinos
- Orlan Calayag, Administrator of the National Food Authority (2013–2014), Mayor of Dolores, Quezon (2019–present)
- Ruben Carranza, Commissioner of the Presidential Commission on Good Government (2001–2004), human rights lawyer
- Melchor V. Cayabyab, former chairperson of the Cooperative Development Authority
- Honorito Chaneco, former administrator of the Light Rail Transit Authority
- Jose L. Cuisia Jr., 7th Governor of the Bangko Sentral ng Pilipinas (1990–1993), Philippine Ambassador to the United States (2011–2016)
- Rolando S. Dela Goza, former Commission on Higher Education commissioner, president of Adamson University (1985–1994)
- Lilia de Lima, Director-General of the Philippine Economic Zone Authority (1995–2016), delegate to the Philippine Constitutional Convention of 1971
- Antonio A. Fleta, former agriculture undersecretary
- Euclides Forbes, Administrator of the Philippine Coconut Authority (2011–2014)
- Rowena Guanzon, Commissioner of the Commission on Elections (2015–2022), Commissioner of the Commission on Audit (2013–2015), Mayor of Cadiz, Negros Occidental (1986–1992), lawyer
- Milwida Guevara, former finance undersecretary
- Diwa C. Guinigundo, Deputy Governor of the Bangko Sentral ng Pilipinas (2005–2019), economist
- Reynaldo A. Laguda, Undersecretary for Education (2015–2016)
- Mario Lamberte, former president of the Philippine Institute for Development Studies, economist
- Francisco H. Licuanan, chairperson and Head of the Subic Bay Metropolitan Authority (2004–2006)
- Gilberto Llanto, former president of the Philippine Institute for Development Studies, economist
- Ben Malayang III, former environment undersecretary, president of Silliman University (2006–2018)
- Abubakar Mangelen, Commissioner for Maguindanaon of the National Commission on Muslim Filipinos (2018–2020) (previously endorsed Isko Moreno)
- Edu Manzano, Chairperson of the Optical Media Board (2004–2009), Vice Mayor of Makati, Metro Manila (1998–2001), actor, television host, 2010 vice presidential candidate under Lakas Kampi CMD, 2016 senatorial candidate, 2019 San Juan representative candidate under Pwersa ng Masang Pilipino
- Manuel C. Medina, former chairperson of the Philippine Reclamation Authority
- Heidi Mendoza, Under-Secretary-General of the United Nations Office of Internal Oversight Services (2015–2019), Commissioner of the Commission on Audit (2011–2015)
- Christian Monsod, Chairperson of the Commission on Elections (1991–1995), member of the Philippine Constitutional Commission of 1986, secretary-general of the National Citizens' Movement for Free Elections during the 1986 presidential election, lawyer
- Roberto Muldong, former chairperson of the Philippine Reclamation Authority
- Vitaliano N. Nañagas II, former chairman of the Development Bank of the Philippines and president of the Social Security System
- Jose Z. Osias, former director of the Poro Point Management Corporation
- Alexander A. Padilla, President and CEO of the Philippine Health Insurance Corporation (2013–2016)
- Emerson U. Palad, Undersecretary of Agriculture (2012–2016)
- Felicito Payumo, Chairperson of the Bases Conversion and Development Authority (2011–2012), chairperson and Administrator of the Subic Bay Metropolitan Authority (1998–2004), Bataan's 1st district representative (1987–1998)
- Asis Perez, Director of the Bureau of Fisheries and Aquatic Resources (2010–2016)
- Jose C. Reaño, Undersecretary of Agriculture for Operations on Livestock (2013–2016)
- Roland S. Recomono, former transportation undersecretary and Office of Transportation Security administrator
- Susan D. Reyes, former assistant executive secretary for the social secretary's office of the Office of the President of the Philippines
- Reynaldo B. Robles, member of the board of directors of the Philippine Reclamation Authority (2011–2017)
- Aika Robredo, Head Executive Assistant at the Office of Civil Defense (2014–2015), daughter of Leni Robredo
- Jorge V. Sarmiento, Deputy Commissioner of the National Telecommunications Commission (2003–2009), Chairperson of the Presidential Commission on Good Government (2001), lawyer
- Rene V. Sarmiento, Commissioner of the Commission on Elections (2006–2013), Presidential Adviser on the Peace Process officer-in-charge (2005–2006), member of the Philippine Constitutional Commission of 1986 and lawyer
- Ronaldo Solis, Commissioner of the National Telecommunications Commission (2004–2007)
- John Philip Sevilla, Commissioner of the Bureau of Customs (2013–2015)
- Luis F. Sison, chairperson of the Philippine Retirement Authority
- Gio Tingson, Chairperson of the National Youth Commission (2014–2016)
- Alfonso Tan Jr., Administrator of the Land Transportation Office (2015–2016)
- Virgilio A. Yuzon, former chairperson of the People's Television Network, former director of the National Development Company, Chief Operating Officer of Cignal Broadcasting Corporation
- Carmen Reyes–Zubiaga, executive director of the National Council on Disability Affairs (2012–2020), persons with disability advocate, activist and 2022 senatorial candidate

==== Diplomats ====
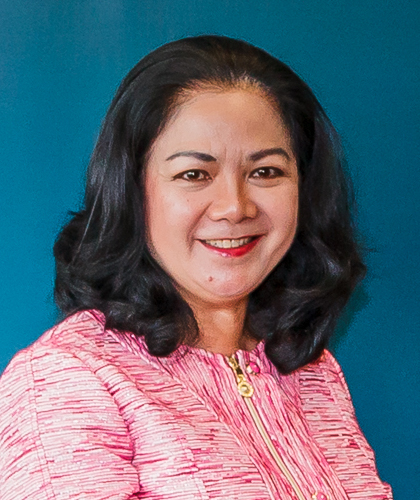
Maria Zeneida Collinson

- Ma. Rosario C. Aguinaldo, Philippine Ambassador to Indonesia (2005–2014)
- Marilyn J. Alarilla, Philippine Ambassador to Turkey (2011–2013), Philippine Ambassador to Laos (2008–2012)
- Belen F. Anota, Philippine Ambassador to Australia (2011–2015), Philippine Ambassador to Singapore (2004–2008), Philippine Ambassador to Israel (2002–2004)
- Jorge V. Arizabal, Philippine Ambassador to Pakistan (2001–2005)
- Victoria Bataclan, Philippine Ambassador to Belgium and Luxembourg and Head of the Philippine Mission to the European Union (2011–2018), Philippine Ambassador to Norway and Iceland (2007–2009), Philippine Consul-General in Hong Kong (1999–2003)
- Estrella A. Berenguel, Philippine Ambassador to Vietnam (2005–2010), Philippine Consul-General in Hong Kong (1996–1999)
- Mary Jo A. Bernardo-Aragon, Philippine Ambassador to Thailand (2012–2019), Philippine Consul-General in Los Angeles (2007–2012)
- Eva G. Betita, former Philippine ambassador to Brazil
- Sonia C. Brady, Undersecretary of Foreign Affairs for Policy (2003–2006), Philippine Ambassador to China (2006–2010, 2011–2012), Philippine Ambassador to Thailand (2002–2003), Philippine Ambassador to Myanmar (1995–1999)
- Blesila C. Cabrera, Philippine Consul-General in Honolulu (2004–2010)
- Susan O. Castrence, Philippine Ambassador to South Korea (2006–2007)
- Maria Zeneida Collinson, Philippine Ambassador to Austria and Permanent Representative of the Philippine Mission to the United Nations Office at Vienna, the International Atomic Energy Agency, the United Nations Industrial Development Organization, and the Comprehensive Nuclear-Test-Ban Treaty Organization (2015–2017); Philippine Ambassador to Sweden (2007–2012)
- Esteban B. Conejos Jr., former permanent representative of the Philippines to the World Trade Organization, Undersecretary for Foreign Affairs
- Macarthur F. Corsino, former Philippine ambassador to Cuba
- Claro S. Cristobal, Philippine Ambassador to Egypt (2011–2015), Philippine Consul-General in Hong Kong (2009–2011), Philippine Consul-General in New York City (2018–2020)
- Petronila P. Garcia, Philippine Ambassador to Canada (2014–2020), Philippine Ambassador to Israel (2007–2011), Philippine Ambassador to Egypt (2004–2007), Philippine Consul-General in New York City (2020–2021)
- Uriel Norman R. Garibay, former Philippine ambassador to Kenya
- Leslie B. Gatan, Philippine Ambassador to Canada (2011–2014)
- Sahid S. Glang, former Philippine ambassador to Bahrain
- Lourdes Gutierrez-Morales, former Philippine ambassador to Cambodia
- Danilo T. Ibayan, former Philippine consul-general in Macau
- Eleanor L. Jaucian, former Philippine ambassador to Hungary
- Macabangkit B. Lanto, Philippine Ambassador to Egypt (1999–2001)
- Eduardo M. Maglaya, Philippine Ambassador to Bahrain (2003–2009), Philippine Chargé d' Affaires to Egypt (2010–2011)
- Bayani V. Mangibin, former Philippine ambassador to Seychelles, former Philippine ambassador to Kenya
- Delia Meñez-Rosal, former Philippine ambassador to Mexico
- Clemencio F. Montesa, former Philippine ambassador to Belgium and head of the Philippine Mission to the European Union
- Aurora Navarro-Tolentino, former Philippine ambassador to Switzerland
- Cristina G. Ortega, Philippine Ambassador to France and Permanent Delegate to UNESCO (2011–2014), Philippine Ambassador to Belgium and the Head of the Philippine Mission to the European Union (2006–2010), Philippine Ambassador to Australia (2004–2006)
- Olivia V. Palala, former Philippine ambassador to Jordan and Palestine, former Philippine consul-general in Chongqing
- Laura Quiambao-Del Rosario, Undersecretary of Foreign Affairs for International Economic Relations (2011–2010), president of Miriam College (2020–present)
- Cecilia B. Rebong, Permanent Representative of the Philippines to the United Nations Office at Geneva (2013–2016)
- Crescente R. Relacion, former Philippine ambassador to Qatar
- Virgilio A. Reyes, Jr., Philippine Ambassador to South Africa (2003–2009), Philippine Ambassador to Italy (2011–2014)
- Maria Rowena M. Sanchez, former Philippine ambassador to Turkey
- Melita Sta. Maria-Thomeczek, Philippine Ambassador to Germany (2015–2018)
- Zenaida Tacorda-Rabago, Philippine Ambassador to Bangladesh (2008–2010)
- Amado Tolentino Jr., Philippine Ambassador to Qatar (1999–2002), delegate to the Philippine Constitutional Convention of 1971, editor
- Alejandro Vicente, former Philippine ambassador to Libya
- Wilfrido V. Villacorta, Philippine Ambassador and Permanent Representative to the ASEAN (2010–2012), Deputy Secretary-General of the ASEAN (2003–2006), member of the Philippine Constitutional Commission of 1986, Dean of the De La Salle University College of Liberal Arts (1983–1986)
- Hector K. Villaroel, Philippine Ambassador to France (1995–2007)
- Jaime J. Yambao, Philippine Ambassador to Laos (1997–2001)

=== Philippine Congress ===
==== Senate ====
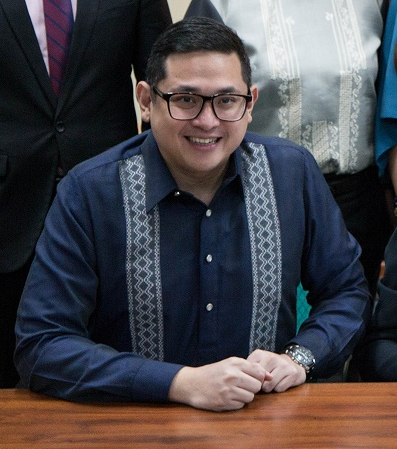
Bam Aquino

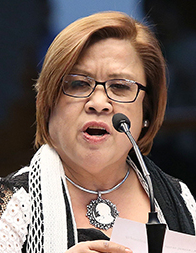
Leila de Lima

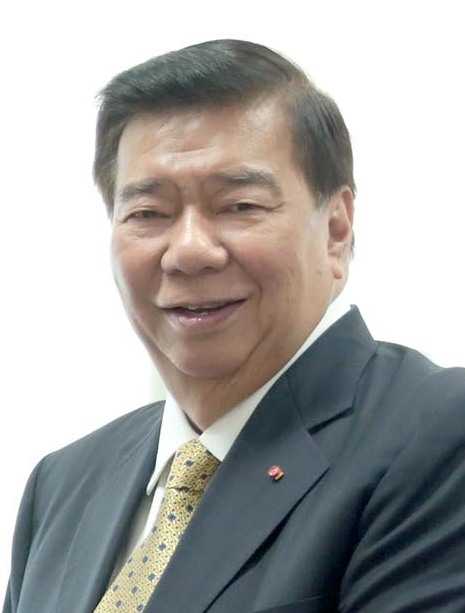
Franklin Drilon

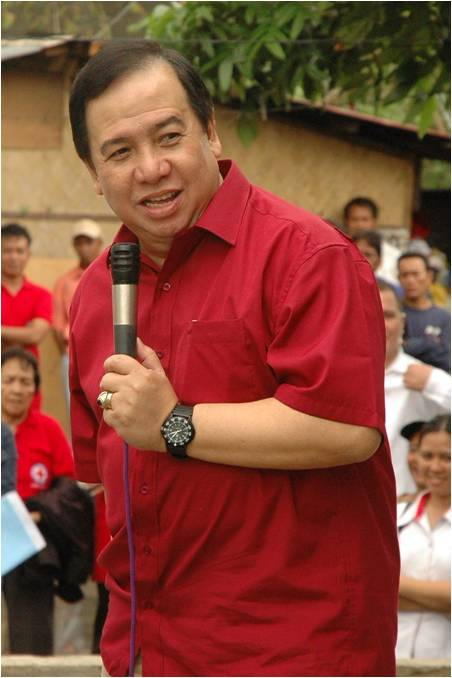
Dick Gordon

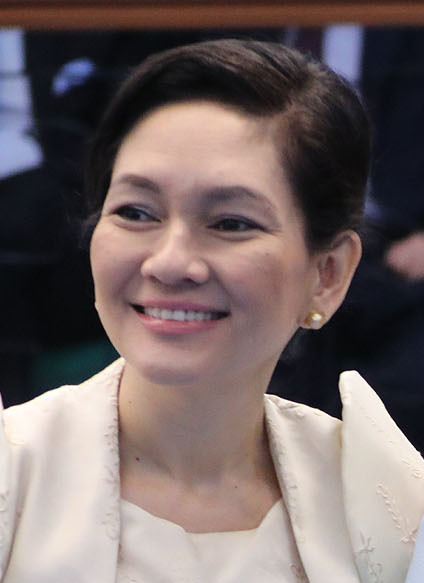
Risa Hontiveros

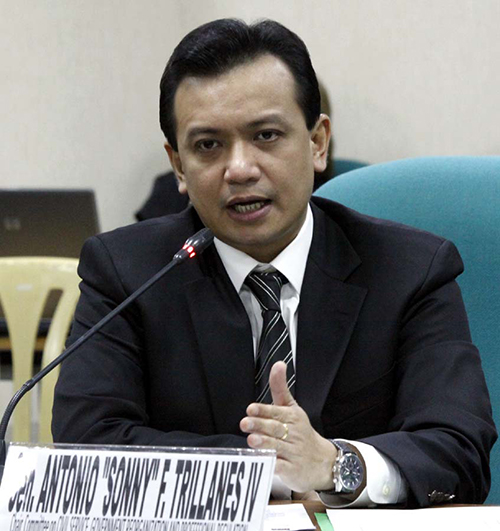
Antonio Trillanes

- Bam Aquino, Senator of the Philippines (2013–2019), Chairperson of the National Youth Commission (2003–2006), television host, social entrepreneur, nephew of President Corazon Aquino, cousin of President Benigno Aquino III and campaign manager of the Leni Robredo 2022 presidential campaign
- Rodolfo Biazon, Senator of the Philippines (1992–1995, 1998–2010), Muntinlupa representative (2010–2016), 21st Chief of Staff of the Armed Forces of the Philippines (1991) (previously endorsed Panfilo Lacson)
- Nikki Coseteng, Senator of the Philippines (1992–2001), Quezon City's 3rd district representative (1987–1992), art gallerist and dealer
- Leila de Lima, Senator of the Philippines (2016–2022), Secretary of Justice (2010–2015), Chairperson of the Commission on Human Rights (2008–2010), recipient of the Liberal International's Prize For Freedom in 2018, 2022 senatorial candidate under Team Robredo–Pangilinan
- Franklin Drilon, Senator of the Philippines (1995–2007, 2010–present), Senate Minority Leader (2017–present), President pro tempore of the Senate (2016–2017), President of the Senate (2000, 2001–2006, 2013–2016), Senate Majority Leader (1998–2000), Executive Secretary (1991–1992), Secretary of Justice (1990–1991, 1992–1995), Secretary of Labor and Employment (1990–1991, 1992–1995), vice-chair of the Liberal Party (2017–present)
- Dick Gordon, Senator of the Philippines (2004–2010, 2016–present), Chairman of the Philippine Red Cross (2004–present), Secretary of Tourism (2001–2004), Chairman of the Subic Bay Metropolitan Authority (1992–1998), Mayor of Olongapo (1980–1986, 1988–1993), delegate to the Philippine Constitutional Convention of 1971, Chairman of the Bagumbayan–VNP, 2022 senatorial candidate under Team Robredo–Pangilinan
- Risa Hontiveros, Senator of the Philippines (2016–present), Akbayan party-list representative (2004–2010), 2022 senatorial candidate under Team Robredo–Pangilinan, activist
- Joey Lina, Senator of the Philippines (1987–1995), Secretary of the Interior and Local Government (2001–2004), Governor of Laguna (1995–2001), Governor of Metro Manila (1986–1987), 2022 Ang Komadrona party-list representative nominee and radio personality
- Ramon Magsaysay Jr., Senator of the Philippines (1995–2007), Zambales representative (1965–1969), businessman, son of President Ramon Magsaysay
- Serge Osmeña, Senator of the Philippines (1995–2007, 2010–2016), grandson of President Sergio Osmeña (previously endorsed Isko Moreno)
- Wigberto Tañada, Senator of the Philippines (1987–1995), Senate Minority Leader (1992–1995), Quezon's 4th district representative (1995–2001)
- Antonio Trillanes, Senator of the Philippines (2007–2019), 2022 senatorial candidate under Team Robredo–Pangilinan, retired lieutenant of the Philippine Navy

==== House of Representatives ====
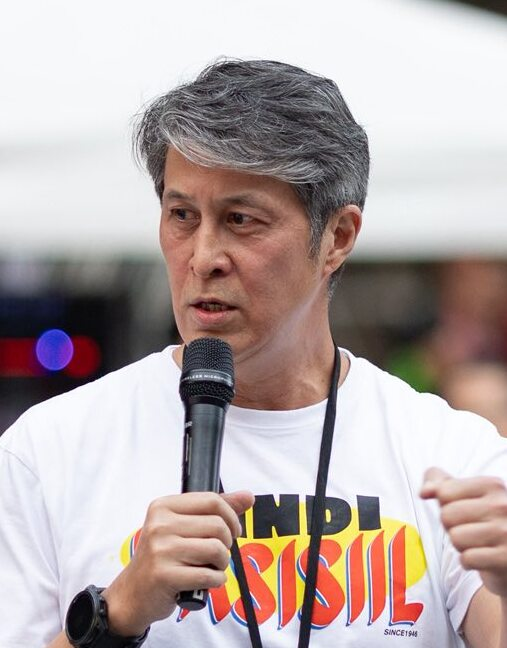
Kit Belmonte

- Francis Gerald Abaya, Cavite's 1st district representative (2013–present), great-grandson of President Emilio Aguinaldo
- Raneo Abu, Batangas' 2nd district representative (2013-2022)
- Beng Abueg, Palawan's 2nd district representative (2019–2022)
- Frederick Abueg, Palawan's 2nd district representative (2013–2019)
- Maria Fe Abunda, Eastern Samar representative (2019–present)
- Ma. Lourdes Acosta-Alba, Bukidnon's 1st district representative (2013–2022)
- Alex Advincula, Cavite's 3rd district representative (2013–2022)
- Irvin Alcala, Quezon's 2nd district representative (2010–2013)
- Gary Alejano, Magdalo party-list representative (2013–2019), 2019 senatorial candidate under Otso Diretso, former captain of the Philippine Marine Corps
- Pantaleon Alvarez, Davao del Norte's 1st district representative (1998–2001, 2019–present), Speaker of the House of Representatives (2016–2018), Secretary of Transportation and Communications (2001–2002), President of the Partido para sa Demokratikong Reporma (2021–present) (previously endorsed Panfilo Lacson; endorsed Tito Sotto for vice president)
- Isagani Amatong, Zamboanga del Norte's 3rd district representative (2013–2022), Governor of Zamboanga del Norte (1986–1995, 1998–2004), Councilor of Dipolog, Zamboanga del Norte (1984–1986)
- Tomas Apacible, Batangas's 1st district representative (2010–2013), Commissioner of the Bureau of Customs (1991–1992)
- Sol Aragones, Laguna's 3rd district representative (2013–2022), 2022 Laguna gubernatorial candidate (Nacionalista), former broadcast journalist
- Amado Bagatsing, Manila's 5th district representative (1987–1998, 2007–2016), 2022 Manila mayoral candidate
- Cristal Bagatsing, Manila's 5th district representative (2016–2022)
- Teddy Baguilat, Ifugao representative (2010–2019), Governor of Ifugao (2001–2004, 2007–2010), Mayor of Kiangan, Ifugao (1995–2001), Vice President for Internal Affairs of the Liberal Party (2017–present), 2022 senatorial candidate under Team Robredo–Pangilinan
- Julienne Baronda, Iloilo City representative (2019–present), Assistant Majority Floor Leader (2019–present), former councilor of Iloilo City
- Elpidio Barzaga Jr., Cavite's 4th district representative (2010–2016, 2019–present), Cavite's 2nd district representative (2007–2010), Mayor of Dasmariñas, Cavite (1998–2007, 2016–2019), president of the National Unity Party (previously endorsed Sara Duterte for vice president)
- Alfel Bascug, Agusan del Sur's 1st district representative (2019–present) (endorsed Sara Duterte for vice president)
- Kit Belmonte, Quezon City's 6th district representative (2013–2022), secretary-general of the Liberal Party
- Tawi Billones, Capiz's 1st district representative (2016–present)
- Gabriel Bordado, Camarines Sur's 3rd district representative (2016–present), Vice Mayor of Naga, Camarines Sur (2004–2013)
- Narciso Bravo Jr., Masbate's 1st district representative (2019–2022), Mayor of San Fernando, Masbate (2004–2013, 2013–2016)
- Ma. Vida V. Espinosa-Bravo, Masbate's 1st district representative (2013–2019)
- Fernando Cabredo, Albay's 3rd district representative (2019–present)
- Teodoro Casiño, Bayan Muna party-list representative (2004–2013), 2013 senatorial candidate, journalist, activist
- France Castro, ACT Teachers party-list representative (2016–present)
- Peping Cojuangco, Tarlac's 1st district representative (1961–1969, 1987–1998), Mayor of Paniqui, Tarlac (1959–1961), Vice Mayor of Paniqui (1957–1959), Councilor of Paniqui (1955–1957), 9th President of the Philippine Olympic Committee (2005–2018), businessman, brother of President Corazon Aquino, uncle of President Benigno Aquino III
- Neri Colmenares, Bayan Muna party-list representative (2007–2016), human rights lawyer, activist, 2022 senatorial candidate
- Eufemia Cullamat, Bayan Muna party-list representative (2019), tribal leader, farmer, activist
- Leo Rafael Cueva, Negros Occidental's 2nd district representative (2013–present)
- Sergio Dagooc, APEC party-list representative (2019–present)
- Paul Daza, Northern Samar's 1st district representative (2007–2010, 2019–present), Governor of Northern Samar (2010–2013)
- Raul Daza, Northern Samar's 1st district representative (1987–1998, 2010–2013, 2016–2019), House Deputy Speaker (1992–1995), Governor of Northern Samar (2001–2010), President of the Liberal Party (1994–1999)
- Presley de Jesus, Philreca party-list representative (2019–present)
- Monsour del Rosario, Makati's 1st district representative (2016–2019), Councilor of Makati (2010–2016), former taekwondo practitioner (1986 Asian Games bronze medalist), actor, 2022 senatorial candidate (previously endorsed Panfilo Lacson)
- Christopher de Venecia, Pangasinan's 4th district representative (2016–present), theater director, former actor (endorsed Sara Duterte for vice president)
- Gina de Venecia, Pangasinan's 4th district representative (2010–2016), humanitarian
- Jose de Venecia Jr., Pangasinan's 4th district representative (1987–1998, 2001–2010), Speaker of the House of Representatives (1992–1998, 2001–2008), Pangasinan's 2nd district representative (1969–1972), 1998 presidential candidate, former chairman of Lakas–CMD
- Lorenz Defensor, Iloilo's 3rd district representative (2019–present), Iloilo Provincial Board member (2016–2019)
- Adriano Ebcas, AKO PADAYON party-list representative (2019–present)
- Sarah Elago, Kabataan party-list representative (2016–present), former national president of the National Union of Students of the Philippines, activist
- Danilo Fernandez, Laguna's 1st district representative (2007–2016, 2019–present), House Deputy Speaker (2019–2020), Mayor of Santa Rosa (2016–2019), Vice Governor of Laguna (2001–2004), former actor
- Lawrence Fortun, Agusan del Norte's 1st district representative (2013–present), Vice Mayor of Butuan (2010–2013), Councilor of Butuan (2007–2010)
- Jocelyn Fortuno, Camarines Sur's 5th district representative (2019–present)
- Arnulf Bryan Fuentebella, Camarines Sur's 4th district representative (2019–present), Mayor of Tigaon, Camarines Sur (2007–2016)
- Ferdinand Gaite, Bayan Muna party-list representative (2019–present)
- Michael Gorriceta, Iloilo's 2nd district representative (2019–present), Mayor of Pavia, Iloilo (2013–2019)
- Ruwel Peter Gonzaga, Davao de Oro's 2nd district representative (2016–present) (previously endorsed Ping Lacson)
- Fernando Gonzalez, Albay's 3rd district representative (2010–2019)
- Magtanggol Gunigundo I, Valenzuela's 2nd district representative (2001–2004, 2007–2016), Valenzuela's defunct lone district representative (1998–2001), delegate to the Philippine Constitutional Convention of 1971
- Godofredo Guya, RECOBODA party-list representative (2019–present)
- Mujiv Hataman, Basilan representative (2019–present), House Deputy Speaker (2019–present), Governor of the Autonomous Region in Muslim Mindanao (2011–2019), Anak Mindanao party-list representative (2001–2010)
- Edcel Lagman, Albay's 1st district representative (1987–1998, 2004–2013, 2016–present), House Minority Leader (2010–2012)
- Glona Labadlabad, Zamboanga del Norte's 2nd district representative (2016–present)
- Paulino Salvador Leachon, Oriental Mindoro's 1st district representative (2013–present)
- Jocelyn Sy-Limkaichong, Negros Oriental's 1st district representative (2007–2013, 2016–present)
- Esmael Mangudadatu, Maguindanao's 2nd district representative (2019–present), Governor of Maguindanao (2010–2019), Mayor of Buluan, Maguindanao (1998–2007), Vice Mayor of Buluan (2007–2010) (previously endorsed Isko Moreno)
- Romeo Momo Sr., Construction Workers' Solidarity party-list representative (2019–present) (endorsed Sara Duterte for vice president)
- Maricel Natividad Nagaño, Nueva Ecija's 4th congressional district representative (2019–present)
- Sandy Ocampo, Manila's 6th district representative (1992–1995, 2010–2019)
- Satur Ocampo, Bayan Muna party-list representative (2001–2010), activist, journalist
- Ronnie Ong, Ang Probinsyano party-list representative (2019–present), representative candidate for Ako'y Pilipino partylist (previously endorsed Ping Lacson)
- Johnny Pimentel, Surigao del Sur's 2nd district representative (2016–present), House Deputy Speaker (2019–2020), Governor of Surigao del Sur (2010–2016) (endorsed Sara Duterte for vice president)
- Eddiebong Plaza, Agusan del Sur's 2nd district representative (2019–present), Governor of Agusan del Sur (2010–2019; 2001-2007) (endorsed Sara Duterte for vice president)
- Sally Ponce Enrile, Cagayan's 1st district representative (2007–2010, 2013–2016), entrepreneur, artist
- Miro Quimbo, Marikina's 2nd district representative (2010–2019), House Deputy Speaker (2016–2018), President of the Home Development Mutual Fund (2002–2009), lawyer
- Stella Quimbo, Marikina's 2nd district representative (2019–present), Commissioner of the Philippine Competition Commission (2016–2019), economist
- Rufus Rodriguez, Cagayan de Oro's 2nd district representative (2007–2016, 2019–present), House Deputy Speaker (2020–present), Commissioner of the Bureau of Immigration (1998–2001), lawyer, President of the Centrist Democratic Party of the Philippines (endorsed Sara Duterte for vice president)
- Oscar Samson Rodriguez, Pampanga's 3rd district representative (1987–1992, 1995–2004, 2013–2016), Mayor of San Fernando, Pampanga (2004–2013)
- Joey Salceda, Albay's 2nd district representative (2016–present), Governor of Albay (2007–2016), Malacañang Chief of Staff (2007), Albay's 3rd district representative (1998–2007) (endorsed Sara Duterte for vice president)
- Hector Sanchez, Catanduanes representative (2019–present), Governor of Catanduanes (1998–2001)
- Cesar Sarmiento, Catanduanes representative (2010–2019)
- Josephine Sato, Occidental Mindoro representative (2001–2004, 2013–present), Governor of Occidental Mindoro (1992–2001, 2004–2013), Vice Governor of Occidental Mindoro (1988–1992), secretary-general of the Liberal Party (2015–2016), treasurer of the Liberal Party (2016–present)
- Bai Sandra A. Sema, Maguindanao's 1st district representative (2010–2019) and House Deputy Speaker (2016–2019) (previously endorsed Isko Moreno)
- Lorna Silverio, Bulacan's 3rd district representative (2001–2010, 2016–present), Mayor of San Rafael, Bulacan (2010–2013)
- Estrellita Suansing, Nueva Ecija's 1st district representative (2013–present)
- Erin Tañada, Quezon's 4th district representative (2004–2013), House Deputy Speaker (2010–2013)
- Antonio Tinio, ACT Teachers party-list representative (2010–2019), chairperson of the Alliance of Concerned Teachers, educator
- Arnel Ty, LPG Marketers Association party-list representative (2010–2019), Treasurer of the Partido para sa Demokratikong Reporma (2021–present) (previously endorsed Ping Lacson)
- Alfonso Umali Jr., Oriental Mindoro's 2nd district representative (2001−2010, 2019–present), Governor of Oriental Mindoro (2010–2019)
- Juliette Uy, Misamis Oriental's 2nd district representative (2013–present) (endorsed Sara Duterte for vice president)
- Tomasito Villarin, Akbayan party-list representative (2016–2019)
- Carlos Isagani Zarate, Bayan Muna party-list representative (2013–present), lawyer, activist

=== Judicial officials ===
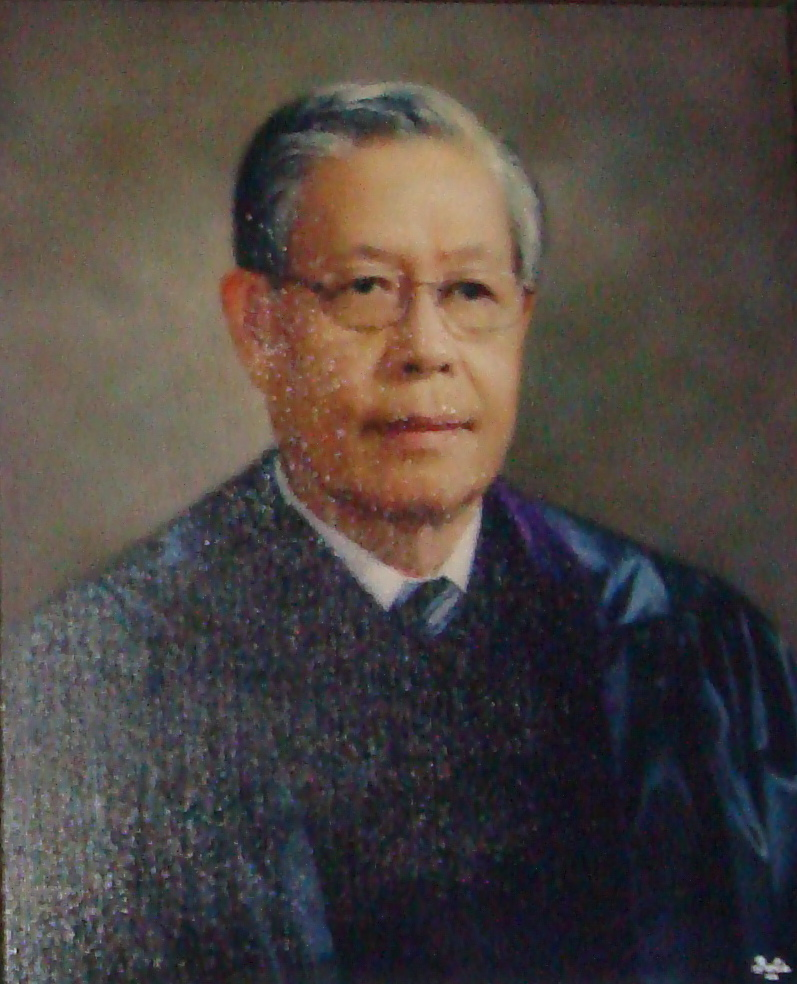
Hilario Davide Jr.

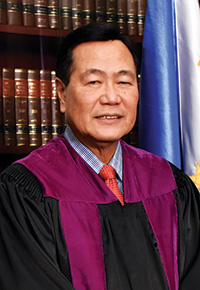
Antonio Carpio

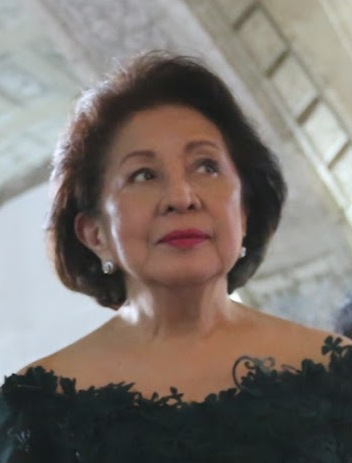
Conchita Carpio-Morales

- Adolfo Azcuna, Associate Justice of the Supreme Court of the Philippines (2002–2009), Chancellor of the Philippine Judicial Academy (2009–present), delegate to the Philippine Constitutional Convention of 1971, member of the Philippine Constitutional Commission of 1986
- Antonio Carpio, Senior Associate Justice of the Supreme Court of the Philippines (2009–2019), Associate Justice of the Supreme Court of the Philippines (2001–2019)
- Conchita Carpio-Morales, 5th Ombudsman of the Philippines (2011–2018), Associate Justice of the Supreme Court of the Philippines (2002–2011)
- Hilario Davide Jr., 20th Chief Justice of the Philippines (1998–2005), Associate Justice of the Supreme Court of the Philippines (1991–1998), Chairperson of the Commission on Elections (1988–1990), 17th Permanent Representative of the Philippines to the United Nations (2007–2010), delegate to the Philippine Constitutional Convention of 1971, member of the Philippine Constitutional Commission of 1986
- Teresita Dy-Liacco Flores, Associate Justice of the Court of Appeals of the Philippines (2004–2011), delegate to the Philippine Constitutional Convention of 1971
- Simeon V. Marcelo, 3rd Ombudsman of the Philippines (2002–2005), Solicitor General of the Philippines (2001–2002), former president of the Philippine Bar Association (2009–2010)
- Theodore Te, Head of the Supreme Court of the Philippines Public Information Office (2012–2018), human rights lawyer

=== Local government officials ===
==== Provincial officials ====
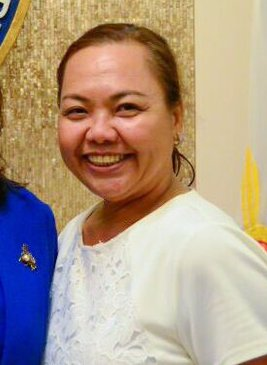
Kaka Bag-ao

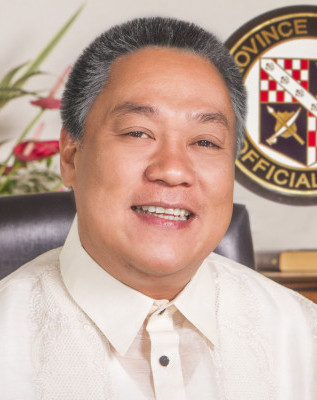
Hilario Davide III

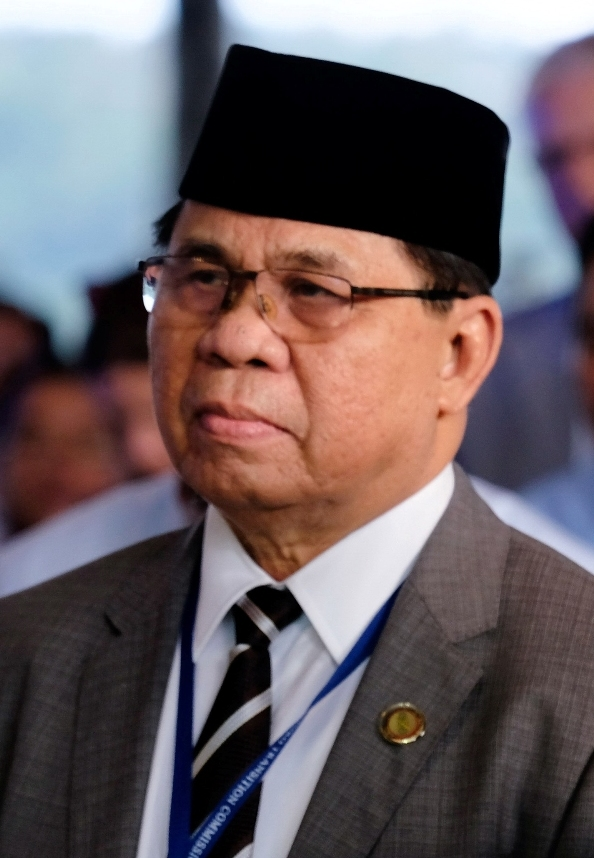
Murad Ebrahim

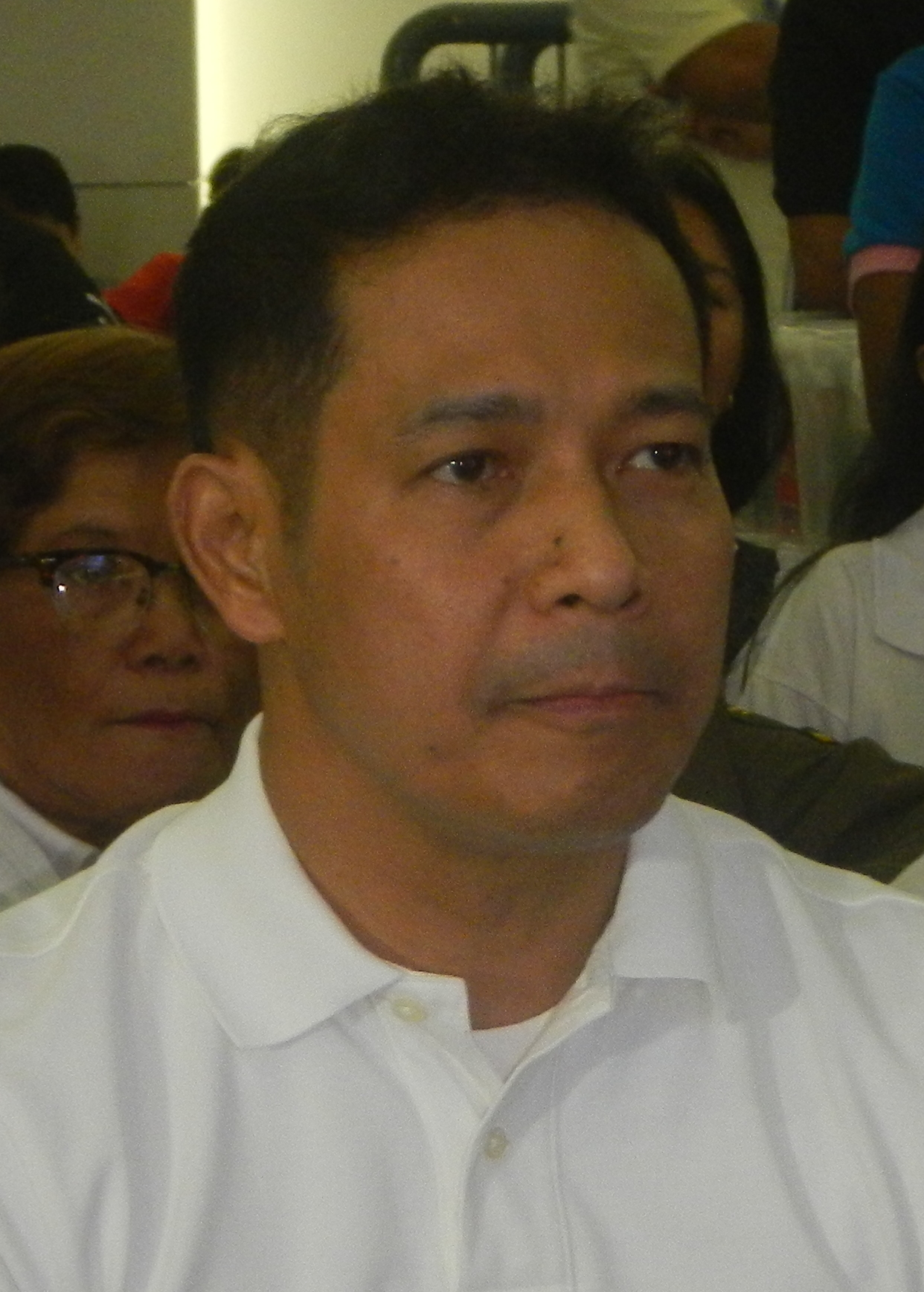
Daniel Fernando

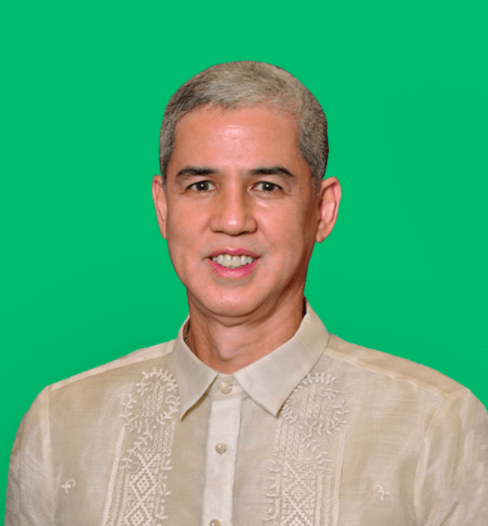
Eugenio Jose Lacson

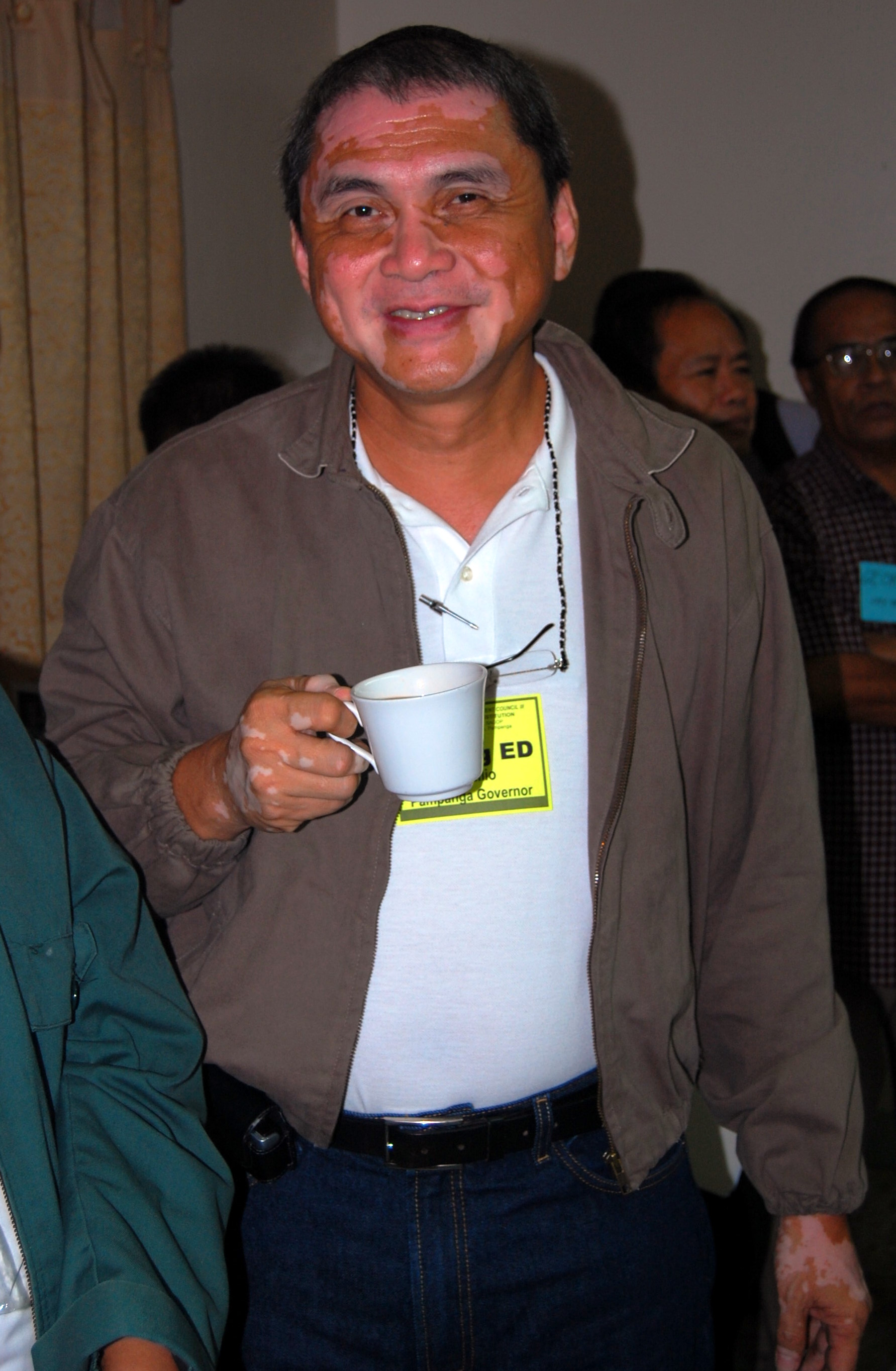
Ed Panlilio

- Soraya Alonto Adiong, Governor of Lanao del Sur (2016–2019)
- Álvaro Antonio, Governor of Cagayan (2007–2013), Mayor of Alcala, Cagayan (1998–2007)
- Kaka Bag-ao, Governor of the Dinagat Islands (2019–present), Dinagat Islands representative (2013–2019), Akbayan party-list representative (2010–2013)
- Al Francis Bichara, Governor of Albay (1995–2004, 2016–present), Albay's 2nd district representative (2007–2016), Albay's 3rd district representative (1992–1995), Mayor of Ligao, Albay (1986–1992)
- Marc Douglas Cagas IV, Governor of Davao del Sur (2021–present), Vice Governor of Davao del Sur (2019–2021), Davao del Sur's 1st district representative (2007–2013)
- Santiago Cane Jr., Governor of Agusan del Sur (2019–present), Agusan del Sur Provincial Board member (1998-2007, 2016–2019), Vice Governor of Agusan del Sur (2007–2016) (endorsed Sara Duterte for vice president)
- Alex Castro, Bulacan Provincial Board member (2016–present), Councilor of Marilao (2007–2013), actor (previously endorsed Isko Moreno)
- Marilou Cayco, Governor of Batanes (2016–present)
- Rafael Coscolluela, Governor of Negros Occidental (1992–2001)
- Joseph Cua, Governor of Catanduanes (2007–2013, 2016–present)
- Hilario Davide III, Vice Governor of Cebu (2019–present), Governor of Cebu (2013–2019)
- Arthur Defensor Sr., Governor of Iloilo (1992–2001, 2010–2019), Iloilo's 3rd district representative (2001–2010)
- Arthur Defensor Jr., Governor of Iloilo (2019–present), Iloilo's 3rd district representative (2010–2019)
- Hazel dela Rosa, Northern Samar Provincial Board member (2019–present)
- Miguel Rene Dominguez, Governor of Sarangani (2004–2013)
- Murad Ebrahim, Chief Minister of Bangsamoro Autonomous Region in Muslim Mindanao (2019–present), MILF chairman (2003–present), UBJP chairman (2014–present)
- Ben Evardone, Governor of Eastern Samar (2019–present), Eastern Samar representative (2010–2019), Vice President for the Visayas of PDP–Laban (Duterte–Cusi faction) (2021–present)
- Daniel Fernando, Governor of Bulacan (2019–present), Vice Governor of Bulacan (2010–2019), Bulacan Provincial Board member (1998–2007), actor (previously endorsed Isko Moreno)
- Yeng Guiao, Vice Governor of Pampanga (2004–2013), Pampanga's 1st district representative (2013–2016), Pampanga Provincial Board member (2001–2004), basketball head coach (NLEX Road Warriors, Philippines men's national basketball team), Philippine Basketball League commissioner (1997–2000)
- Hadjiman Hataman, Governor of Basilan (2016–present), Basilan representative (2010–2016)
- Edwin Jubahib, Governor of Davao del Norte (2019–present), Secretary-General of the Partido para sa Demokratikong Reporma (2021–present) (previously endorsed Panfilo Lacson)
- Eugenio Jose Lacson, Governor of Negros Occidental (2019–present), Vice Governor of Negros Occidental (2013–2019), Mayor of San Carlos, Negros Occidental (2001–2010) (endorsed Tito Sotto for vice president)
- Edcel Greco Lagman, Vice Governor of Albay (2016–present), Albay's 1st district representative (2013–2016)
- Mark Leviste, Vice Governor of Batangas (2007-2016, 2019–present), Batangas 4th District Provincial Board Member (2004-2007) (previously endorsed Sara Duterte for vice-president)
- Agnes Magpale, Vice Governor of Cebu (2011–2019), Acting Governor of Cebu (2012–2013), Cebu Provincial Board member (1992–2001, 2004–2011)
- Lalo Matugas, Governor of Surigao del Norte (1992–2001, 2019–present), Surigao del Norte's 1st district representative (2007–2016)
- Edwin Ongchuan, Governor of Northern Samar (2019–present), Northern Samar's 2nd district representative (2016–2019)
- Grace Padaca, Governor of Isabela (2004–2010), Commissioner of the Commission on Elections (2012–2014)
- Ed Panlilio, Governor of Pampanga (2007–2010)
- Mei Ling Quezon-Brown, Vice Governor of Siquijor (2016–present)
- Ding Roman, Governor of Bataan (1986–1992; 1993–2004)
- Kerby Javier Salazar, Cavite Provincial Board member (2019–present), President of the Katipunan ng Nagkakaisang Pilipino (2021–present)
- Maria Mikaela Singson-Mendoza, Ilocos Sur Provincial Board member (2016–present)
- Samuel Tortor, Vice Governor of Agusan del Sur (2016–present), Agusan del Sur Provincial Board member (2007–2016) (endorsed Sara Duterte for vice president)
- Luigi Villafuerte, Candidate for Governor of Camarines Sur

==== City and municipal officials ====
- Don Abalon, Mayor of San Roque, Northern Samar
- Sunshine Abcede, Councilor of Lucena, Quezon
- Jose Ivan Agda, Mayor of Borongan, Eastern Samar
- Margarita Aguinillo, Mayor of Buhi, Camarines Sur
- Emmanuel Alfelor, Mayor of Iriga, Camarines Sur
- Madel Yorobe Alfelor. Mayor of Iriga, Camarines Sur
- Viviane Alvarez, Mayor of Oras, Eastern Samar
- Maria Luisa Angeles, Mayor of Bombon, Camarines Sur
- Estelita M. Aquino, Mayor of Moncada, Tarlac
- Tin Antonio, Mayor of Alcala, Cagayan (2019–present)
- Alan R. Arandia, Mayor of Pio Duran, Albay
- Rommel Arnado, Mayor of Kauswagan, Lanao del Norte (previously endorsed Panfilo Lacson)
- Joseph Ascutia, Mayor of Labo, Camarines Norte
- Rafael Asebias, Mayor of Quinapondan, Eastern Samar
- Ferdinand Avila, Mayor of San Isidro, Northern Samar
- Eunice Balbacon, Mayor of Paranas, Samar
- Teresita Bandal, Mayor of Capul, Northern Samar
- Danilo Baylon, Mayor of Candaba, Pampanga (2016–2019)
- Jennifer Barzaga, Mayor of Dasmariñas, Cavite (2019–present) (previously endorsed Sara Duterte for vice president)
- Tomas Bocago, Mayor of Sipocot, Camarines Sur
- Tom Bongalonta, Mayor of Pili, Camarines Sur
- Bernard Brioso, Mayor of Libmanan, Camarines Sur
- Nelson Buesa, Mayor of Garchitorena, Camarines Sur
- Dexter Calizo, Mayor of Balete, Aklan
- Rey Canaynay, Councilor of Dasmariñas, Cavite (2010–2019)
- Jose Blanco Cardenas, Mayor of Canlaon, Negros Oriental
- Shonny Carpeso, Mayor of Dolores, Eastern Samar
- Reynaldo Catacutan, Mayor of Capas, Tarlac
- Lenybelle Ceriola-Santos, Mayor of Malinao, Albay
- Beng Climaco, Mayor of Zamboanga City (2013–present), Zamboanga City's 2nd district representative (2007–2013), Vice Mayor of Zamboanga City (2004–2007) (endorsed Sara Duterte for vice president)
- Marilyn Co, Mayor of Caramoan, Camarines Sur
- Allan Contado, Mayor of Balangkayan, Eastern Samar
- Camalodin Jamal Dadayan, Mayor of Buadiposo-Buntong, Lanao del Sur
- Ronnie T. Dadivas, Mayor of Roxas, Capiz (2019–present), Vice Mayor of Roxas (2007–2013), Councilor of Roxas (2004–2007), member of the board of directors of the Philippine Health Insurance Corporation (2016–2018)
- Lito Dajalos, Former Vice Mayor of Garcia-Hernandez, Bohol
- Clarence Dato, Mayor of San Jose, Northern Samar
- Jimmy Deleña, Mayor of Presentacion, Camarines Sur
- Dante De Guzman, Councilor of Quezon City
- Juan Enero, Vice Mayor of Capalonga, Camarines Norte
- Salvador Escalante, Mayor of Cadiz, Negros Occidental
- Dennis Estaron, Mayor of San Julian, Eastern Samar
- Roland Boie Evardone, Mayor of Arteche, Eastern Samar
- Ver Evardone, Mayor of Jipapad, Eastern Samar
- Trina Fabic, Mayor of Odiongan, Romblon
- Loijorge Fagalan, Vice Mayor of Banton, Romblon
- Apple Francisco, 2022 Quezon City's 5th district council candidate
- Ronaldo Franco, Mayor of Pamplona, Camarines Sur
- Jaime Fresnedi, Mayor of Muntinlupa, Metro Manila (1998–2007, 2013–present), Vice Mayor of Muntinlupa (1987–1998)
- Bimbo Fernandez, City Administrator of Cebu City
- John Fuentebella, Mayor of Sagñay, Camarines Sur
- Pamela Fuentebella, Mayor of Tigaon, Camarines Sur
- Ronald Galicia, Mayor of Rapu-Rapu, Albay
- Godofredo Garado, Mayor of Maydolong, Eastern Samar
- Justin Gatuslao, Mayor of Himamaylan, Negros Occidental
- Gil Germino, Mayor of Can-avid, Eastern Samar
- Efren Gica, Mayor of Dumanjug, Cebu
- Allan Go, Mayor of Ocampo, Camarines Sur
- Gilbert Go, Mayor of Giporlos, Eastern Samar
- Clarita Gomba, Mayor of Gamay, Northern Samar
- Annaliza Gonzales-Kwan, Mayor of Guiuan, Eastern Samar
- Patricia Gonzalez-Alsua, Mayor of Ligao, Albay
- Clara Gremio, Mayor of Bobon, Northern Samar
- Raymund Gumboc, Vice Mayor of Pandan, Antique
- Jose Edwin Hamor, Mayor of Casiguran, Sorsogon; 2022 Sorsogon gubernatorial candidate
- Chesskha Hernandez, Vice Mayor of Calauan, Laguna
- Leo Jarito, Mayor of Silvino Lobos, Northern Samar
- Rosendo Labadlabad, Mayor of Sindangan, Zamboanga del Norte (2019–present), Zamboanga del Norte's 2nd district representative (2007–2016)
- Krisel Lagman-Luistro, Mayor of Tabaco, Albay; Albay's 1st district representative (1998–2004)
- Ayran Lantud, Mayor of Pantao Ragat, Lanao del Norte
- Nelson S. Legacion, Mayor of Naga, Camarines Sur
- Kaye Ann Legaspi, Councilor of Olongapo, Zambales, Vice President for Youth of Aksyon Demokratiko (2021–present) (previously endorsed Isko Moreno; endorses Sara Duterte for vice president)
- Ronin Leviste, Vice Mayor, Lian, Batangas (2022–present) (previously endorsed Sara Duterte for vice-president)
- Tito Luneza, Mayor of San Vicente, Northern Samar
- Mario Madera, Mayor of Mondragon, Northern Samar
- Alfredo Marañon III, Mayor of Sagay, Negros Occidental
- Wilfredo Maronilla, Mayor of Libon, Albay
- Mariano Martinez, Mayor of San Remigio, Cebu
- Lilian Matamorosa, Mayor of Lupi, Camarines Sur
- Maria Luisa Menzon, Mayor of Lapinig, Northern Samar
- Melchor Mergal, Mayor of Salcedo, Eastern Samar
- Gerardo Miranda, Mayor of Rosario, Northern Samar
- Nora T. Modomo, Mayor of Santa Ignacia, Tarlac
- Oscar Moreno, Mayor of Cagayan de Oro (2013–present), Governor of Misamis Oriental (2004–2013), Misamis Oriental's 1st district representative (1998–2004)
- Ferdinand Amante, Jr., Mayor of Butuan (2010-2016)
- Edwin Santiago, Mayor of San Fernando, Pampanga (2013–present), Vice Mayor of San Fernando (2004–2013), Councilor of San Fernando (1988–1998)
- Thelma Nicart, Mayor of San Policarpio, Eastern Samar
- Harris Ongchuan, Mayor of Laoang, Northern Samar
- Maria Rosario Ochoa-Montejo, Mayor of Pulilan, Bulacan
- Bernadeth Olivares, Councilor of San Pedro, Laguna
- Ann Gemma Ongjoco, Mayor of Guinobatan, Albay
- Antolin Oreta III, Mayor of Malabon, Metro Manila (2012–present), Vice Mayor of Malabon (2010–2012), nephew of President Corazon Aquino and cousin of President Benigno Aquino III
- Margot Osmeña, Acting Mayor of Cebu City, Cebu (2016), Member of the Cebu City Council from the 2nd district (2010–2019), 2022 Cebu City mayoral candidate under LDP
- Tomas Osmeña, Mayor of Cebu City, Cebu (1988–1995, 2001–2010, 2016–2019), Cebu City's 2nd district representative (2010–2013), grandson of President Sergio Osmeña
- Cothera Palafox-Yamamoto, Mayor of Bani, Pangasinan
- Ana Palloc, Mayor of Lope de Vega, Northern Samar
- Marcel Pan, Mayor of Goa, Camarines Sur
- Delfin Pilapil, Mayor of Lagonoy, Camarines Sur
- Karen Polinga, Mayor of Siruma, Camarines Sur
- Richard Quezon, Mayor of Siquijor, Siquijor
- Edwin Quiminales, Mayor of Mercedes, Eastern Samar
- Thaddeus Ramos, Mayor of Ragay, Camarines Sur
- Allan Rellon, Mayor of Tagum, Davao del Norte
- Felipe Antonio Remollo, Mayor of Dumaguete, Negros Oriental
- Anthony Reyes, Mayor of Milaor, Camarines Sur
- Antonio Delos Reyes, Mayor of Biri, Northern Samar
- Armando Romano, Mayor of Bacacay, Albay
- Noel Rosal, Mayor of Legazpi, Albay (2001–2010, 2013–present), city administrator of Legazpi (2010–2013)
- Francisco Rosales, Mayor of Catarman, Northern Samar
- Sammy Rosario, Mayor of Binmaley, Pangasinan
- Edito Saludaga, Mayor of Lavezares, Northern Samar
- Heracleo Santiago, Mayor of Maslog, Eastern Samar
- Philip Señar, Mayor of Magarao, Camarines Sur
- Felipe Sosing, Mayor of Pambujan, Northern Samar
- Jose Arturo Suan, Mayor of Allen, Northern Samar
- Amenodin Sumagayan, Vice Mayor of Taraka, Lanao del Sur
- Arlito Tan, Mayor of Las Navas, Northern Samar
- John Tejano, Mayor of Mapanas, Northern Samar
- Jerry Treñas, Mayor of Iloilo City, Iloilo (2019–present), Iloilo City representative (2010–2019)
- Flora Ty, Mayor of General MacArthur, Eastern Samar
- Gina Ty, Mayor of Taft, Eastern Samar
- Toto Veloso, Vice Mayor of Tagbilaran, Bohol
- Galahad Vicencio, Mayor of Catubig, Northern Samar
- Jaime Villanueva, Mayor of Tiwi, Albay
- Javier Zacate, Mayor of Sulat, Eastern Samar

=== Military officials ===
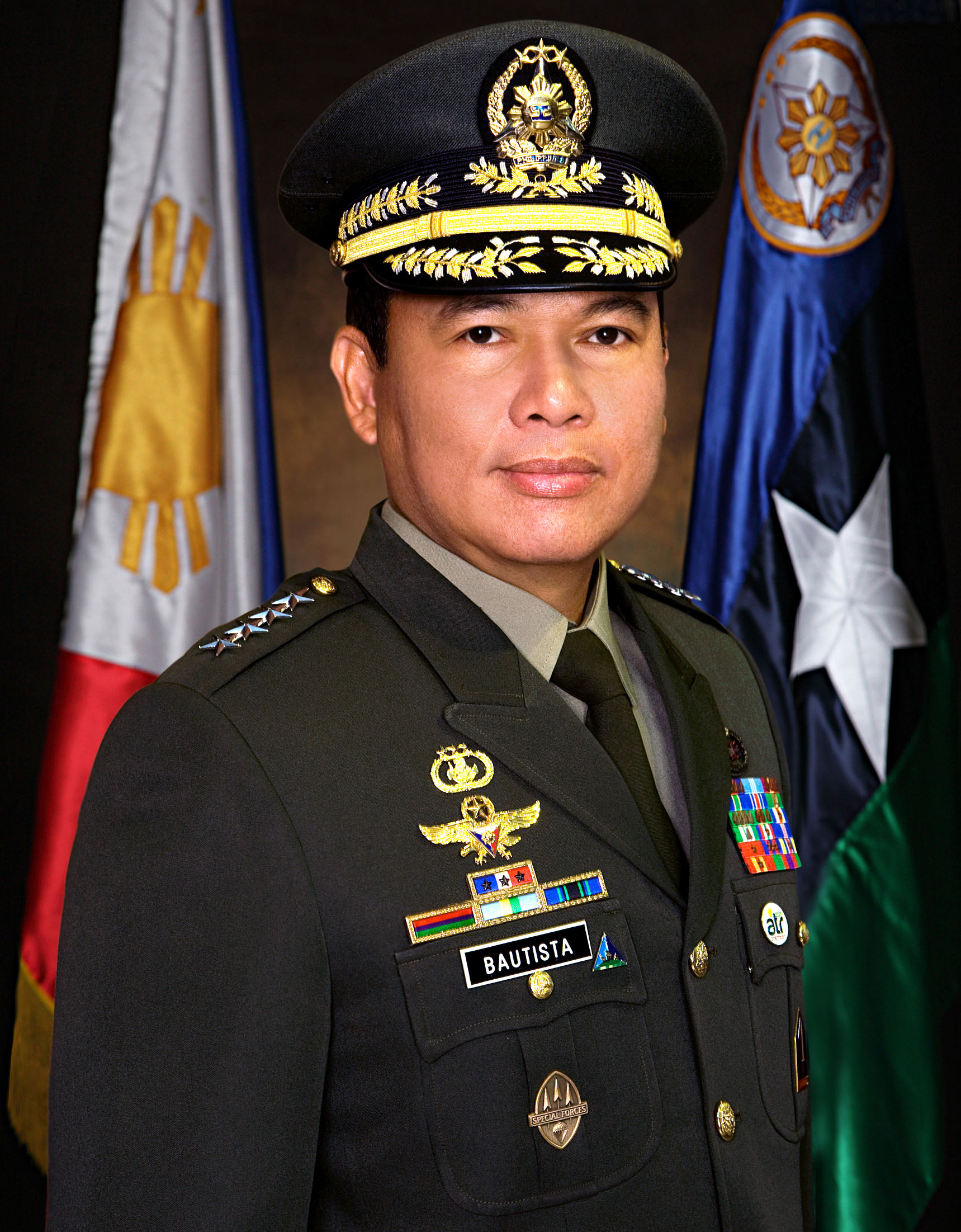
Emmanuel Bautista

- Emmanuel Bautista, 44th Chief of Staff of the Armed Forces of the Philippines (2013–2014)
- Jessie Dellosa, 43rd Chief of Staff of the Armed Forces of the Philippines (2011–2013)
- William Hotchkiss III, 24th Commanding General of the Philippine Air Force (1996–1999), Director–General of the Civil Aviation Authority of the Philippines (2012–2016)
- Hernando Iriberri, 46th Chief of Staff of the Armed Forces of the Philippines (2015–2016)
- Eduardo Oban, 42nd Chief of Staff of the Armed Forces of the Philippines (2011)
- Rommel Jude G. Ong, former vice commander of the Philippine Navy

=== Police officials ===
- Ricardo C. Marquez, 18th Chief of the Philippine National Police (2015–2016)
- Luisito Palmera, Commissioner of the National Police Commission (2010–2016)
- Felipe L. Rojas Jr., Chairman of the Dangerous Drugs Board (2016), Deputy Director-General for Administration of the Philippine National Police (2013–2016)
- Reginald Villasanta, Undersecretary of the Office of the President of the Philippines and executive director of the Presidential Anti-Organized Crime Commission (2010–2016)

=== Political parties, organizations, and alliances ===
- 1Sambayan
- Achievers with Integrity Movement
- AGRI Partylist
- Akbayan Citizens' Action Party
- Ako Padayon Pilipino
- Ako'y Pilipino Party-List
- ANGKLA Party-List
- Anduyog
- APEC Partylist
- Bando Osmeña – Pundok Kauswagan (endorsed Tito Sotto for vice president)
- Basilan Unity Party
- Centrist Democratic Party of the Philippines (endorsed Sara Duterte for vice president)
- Guardians Brotherhood (a faction of Guardians Brotherhood who endorsed Bongbong Marcos for president and Sara Duterte for vice president)
- Hukbong Federal (a faction of Hukbong Federal who endorsed Bongbong Marcos for president and Sara Duterte for vice president)
- Isang Mamamayan para kay Leni (IM k Leni) (a faction of Ikaw Muna Pilipinas who was endorsing Isko Moreno)
- Katipunan ng Nagkakaisang Pilipino
- Kusog Bicolandia
- Liberal Party
- Magdalo Party-List
- Makabayan
- Manibela Party-List
- Moro Islamic Liberation Front (endorsed Sara Duterte for Vice President)
- Moro National Liberation Front (endorsed Sara Duterte for Vice President)
- National Unity Party
- Pambansang Lakas ng Kilusang Mamamalakaya ng Pilipinas (Pamalakaya)
- Partido Federal ng Pilipinas (Abubakar Mangelen-led faction) (previously endorsed Isko Moreno)
- Partido Manggagawa
- Partido para sa Demokratikong Reporma (previously endorsed Ping Lacson; endorsed Tito Sotto for vice president)
- Philreca Party-List
- Recoboda
- Rebolusyonaryong Alyansa Makabayan (previously endorsed Bongbong Marcos for president and Sara Duterte for vice president)
- United Bangsamoro Justice Party

== Non-political endorsements ==
=== Academics ===
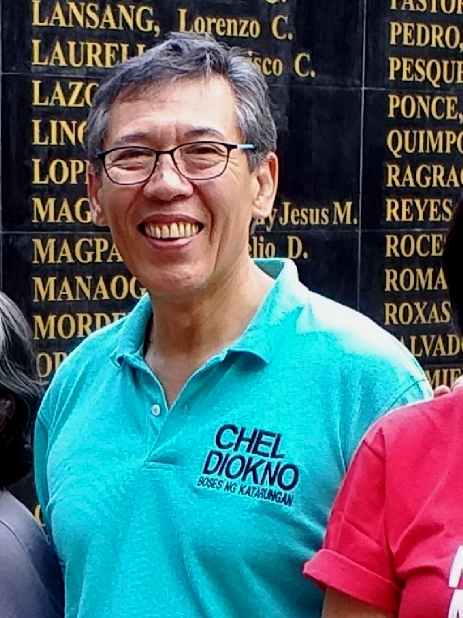
Chel Diokno

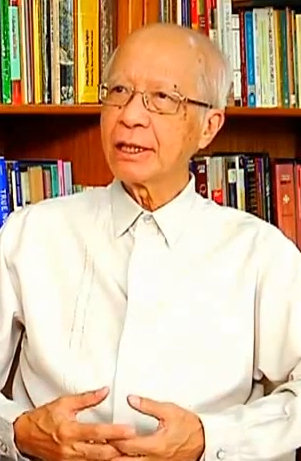
Bienvenido Nebres

- Chel Diokno, lawyer, human rights advocate, chairperson of the Free Legal Assistance Group, founding dean of the De La Salle University College of Law (2009–2019), 2022 senatorial candidate under Team Robredo–Pangilinan
- Edmundo L. Fernandez, member of the De La Salle Brothers, president of De La Salle–College of Saint Benilde (2006–2007, 2020–present) and La Salle Green Hills
- Raquel Fortun, the first female forensic pathologist in the Philippines
- Augusto W. Go, lawyer, entrepreneur, president of the University of Cebu
- Gideon Lasco, medical anthropologist, opinion and editorial writer
- Marcelo V. Manimtim, Vincentian Roman Catholic priest, president of Adamson University (2015–present)
- Christopher C. Maspara, Roman Catholic priest of the Augustinian Recollect order, president of the University of San Jose–Recoletos
- Bienvenido Nebres, Roman Catholic priest of the Jesuit order, president of the Ateneo de Manila University (1993–2011), scientist, mathematician, National Scientist of the Philippines
- Bernard S. Oca, member of the De La Salle Brothers, president of De La Salle University (2021–present)
- Dionisia A. Rola, former chancellor of the University of the Philippines Visayas, the first Filipino to graduate from an Australian university, centenarian
- Florangel Rosario-Braid, former president and executive dean of the Asian Institute of Journalism and Communication, member of the Philippine Constitutional Commission of 1986, columnist
- Gilbert B. Sales, CICM Roman Catholic priest, president of Saint Louis University (2015–present)
- Karel San Juan, Roman Catholic priest of the Jesuit order, president of the Ateneo de Zamboanga University (2013–present)
- Henry H. Santiago, Roman Catholic priest of the Augustinian Recollect order, president of San Sebastian College – Recoletos
- Emanuel V. Soriano, president of the University of the Philippines (1979–1981)
- Mars P. Tan, Roman Catholic priest of the Jesuit order, president of Xavier University – Ateneo de Cagayan (2020–present), marine biologist
- Jose Ramon Villarin, Roman Catholic priest of the Jesuit order, president of the Ateneo de Manila University (2011–2020), physicist, member of the Intergovernmental Panel on Climate Change which received the 2007 Nobel Peace Prize
- Jose Gualberto I. Villasis, Roman Catholic priest, rector-president of the Aklan Catholic College
- Maria Marissa Viri, Roman Catholic nun, member of the Religious of the Virgin Mary, president of the University of the Immaculate Conception
- Roberto Yap, Roman Catholic priest of the Jesuit order, president of the Ateneo de Manila University (2020–present), president of Xavier University – Ateneo de Cagayan (2011–2020), economist

=== Activists and public figures ===
- Teodoro C. Bacani, former bishop of the Roman Catholic Diocese of Novaliches, member of the Philippine Constitutional Commission of 1986
- Gang Badoy, radio and television personality, writer, businesswoman, mental health clinician, political advocate, founder of Rock Ed Philippines
- Rizalito David, lawyer and 2022 candidate for Vice–President of the Democratic Party of the Philippines (endorsed Tito Sotto for vice–president)
- Nuelle Duterte, New Zealand-based physician, niece of President Rodrigo Duterte
- Ed Garcia, member of the Philippine Constitutional Commission of 1986, human rights activist, writer
- Elmer Labog, labor leader, activist, Chairman of Kilusang Mayo Uno, 2022 senatorial candidate
- Cheche Lazaro, broadcast journalist, co-founder and editor-at-large of Rappler
- Sonny Matula, labor leader, lawyer, National President of the Federation of Free Workers, 2022 senatorial candidate under Team Robredo–Pangilinan
- Tricia Robredo, physician, former sports reporter, daughter of Leni Robredo
- Jon-jon Rufino, businessman, LGBT rights advocate
- Gia Sison, physician, occupational medicine doctor
- Jaime Tadeo, member of the Philippine Constitutional Commission of 1986, peasants and farmers' rights activist
- Mitzi Jonelle Tan, climate justice activist, member of the School Strike for Climate movement

=== Business executives and leaders ===
- Laurent Benig, founder and CEO of Laurent Cosmetics
- Martine Cajucom-Ho, model, businesswoman, fashion designer, social media influencer, creative director of Sunnies Studios
- Gonzalo Catan Jr., innovator, entomologist, founder and CEO of the Manila Pest Control, delegate to the Philippine Constitutional Convention of 1971
- Reese Fernandez-Ruiz, president and co-founder of Rags2Riches
- Angelina Mead King, model, managing director of Victoria Court, LGBT rights advocate
- Victorio Joseph Ramoso Lorenzo, executive director of SEAOIL Foundation, Inc.
- Jose Teodoro K. Limcaoco, president and CEO of the Bank of the Philippine Islands
- Tony Meloto, founder of Gawad Kalinga, social entrepreneur, activist
- Jinno Mina, regional manager for Southeast Asia of Ditto Music
- Ana Patricia Non, social entrepreneur, founder of the Maginhawa community pantry
- Anthony Pangilinan, chairman of BusinessWorks, motivational speaker, television personality, brother of Francis Pangilinan
- Katrina Razon, businesswoman, founder and CEO of KSR Ventures, disc jockey, yoga instructor
- Rissa Mananquil Trillo, entrepreneur, author
- Jessica Wilson, model, businesswoman, co-founder, brand manager of Sunnies Face
- Jonathan Yabut, entrepreneur, author, motivational speaker, winner of The Apprentice Asia

=== Fashion figures ===
- Martin Bautista, fashion designer
- JC Buendia, fashion designer
- Zarah Juan, accessories designer
- Jigs Mayuga, make-up artist
- Margaux Medina, celebrity stylist
- Sam Rivera, fashion designer

=== Media personalities ===
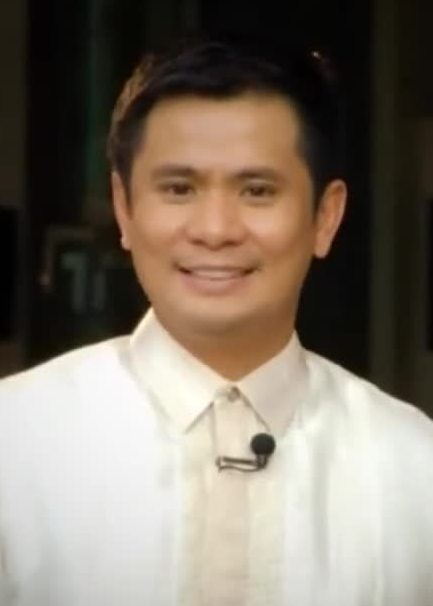
Ogie Alcasid

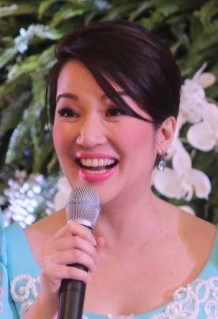
Kris Aquino

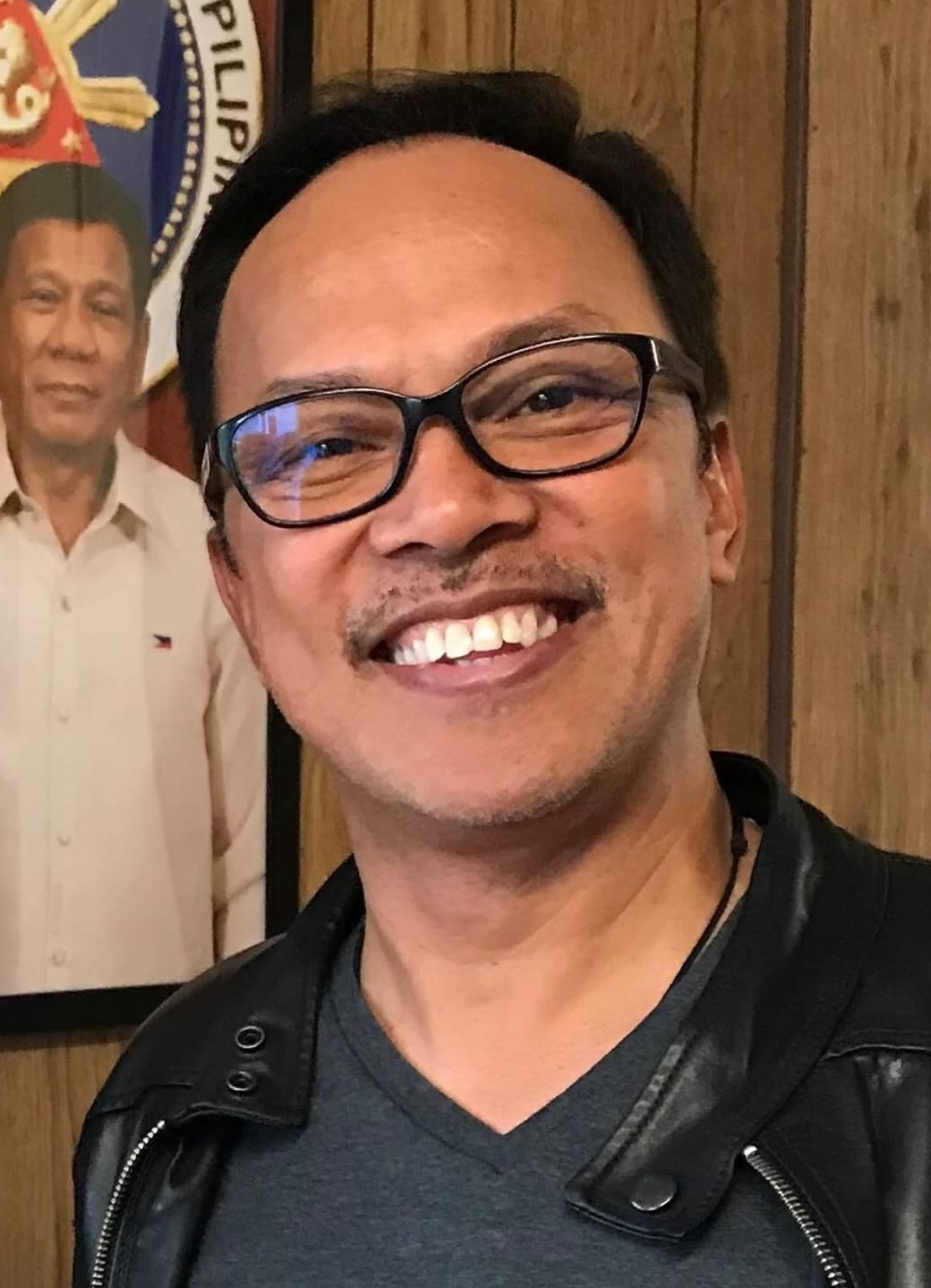
Noel Cabangon

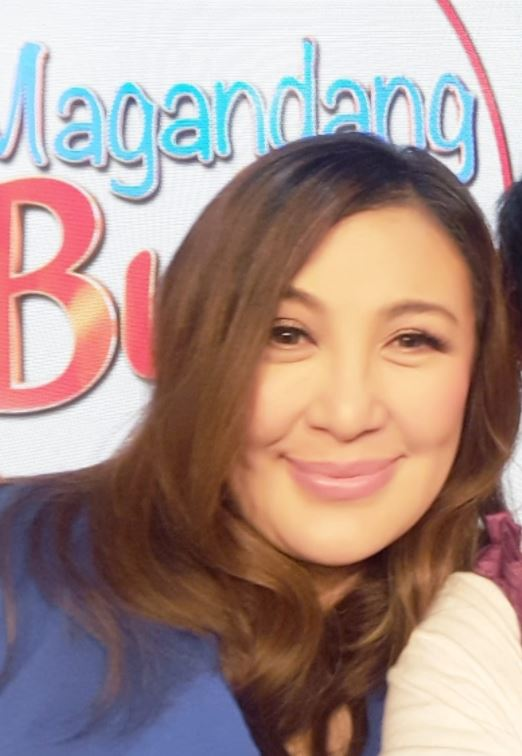
Sharon Cuneta

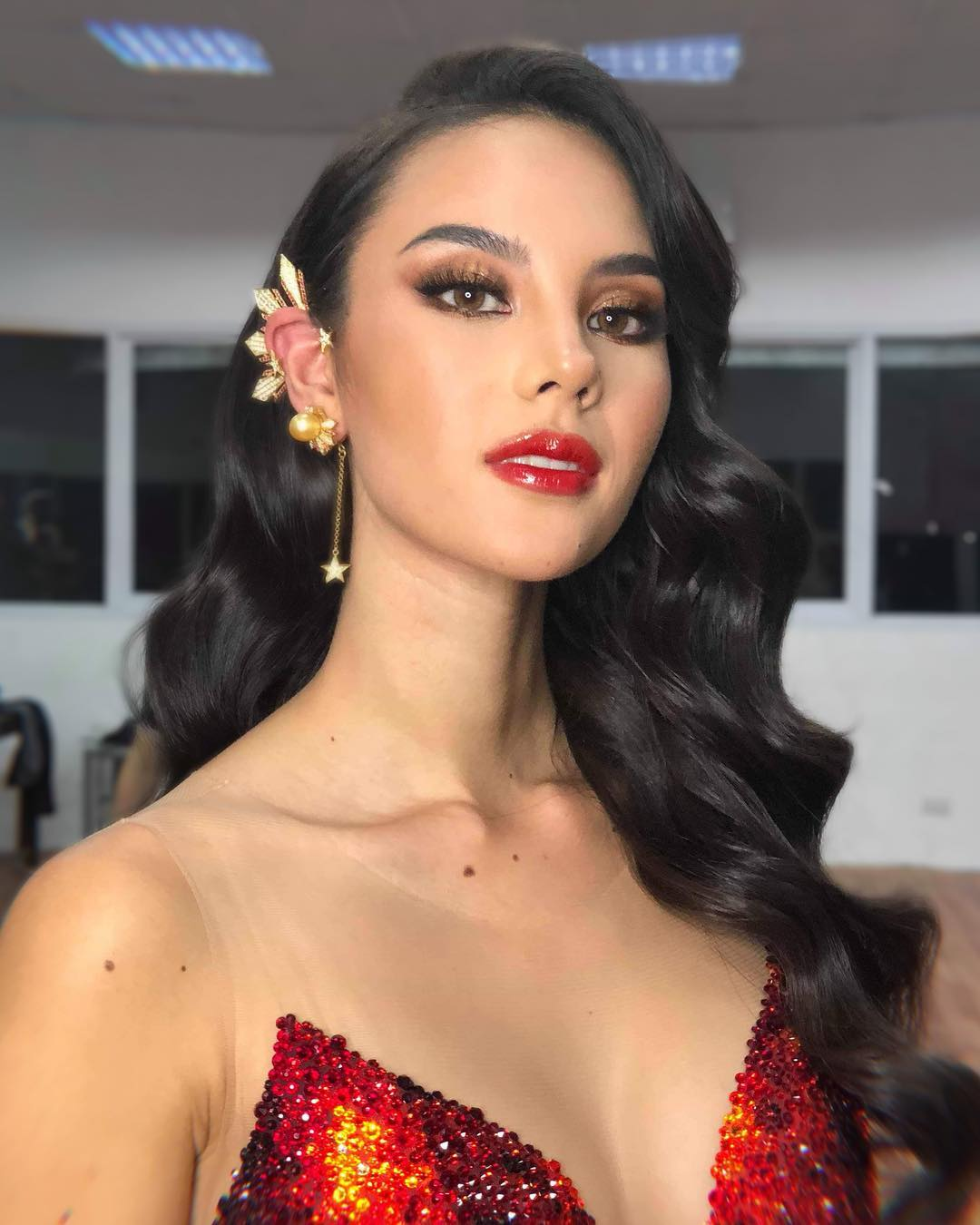
Catriona Gray

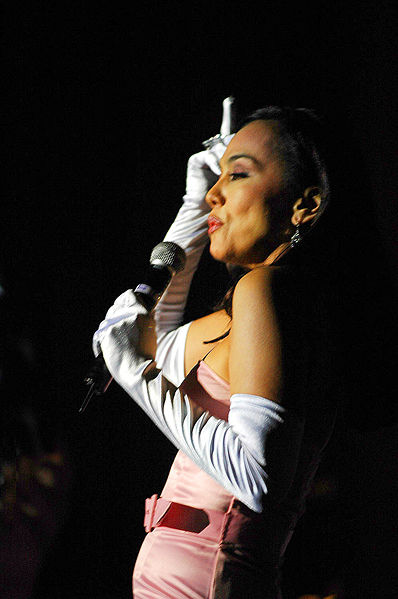
Kuh Ledesma

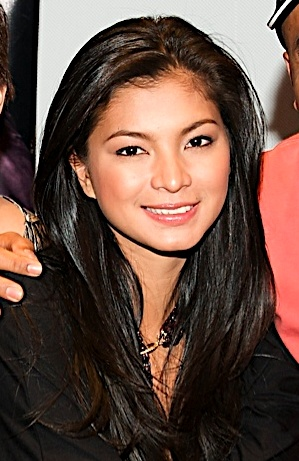
Angel Locsin

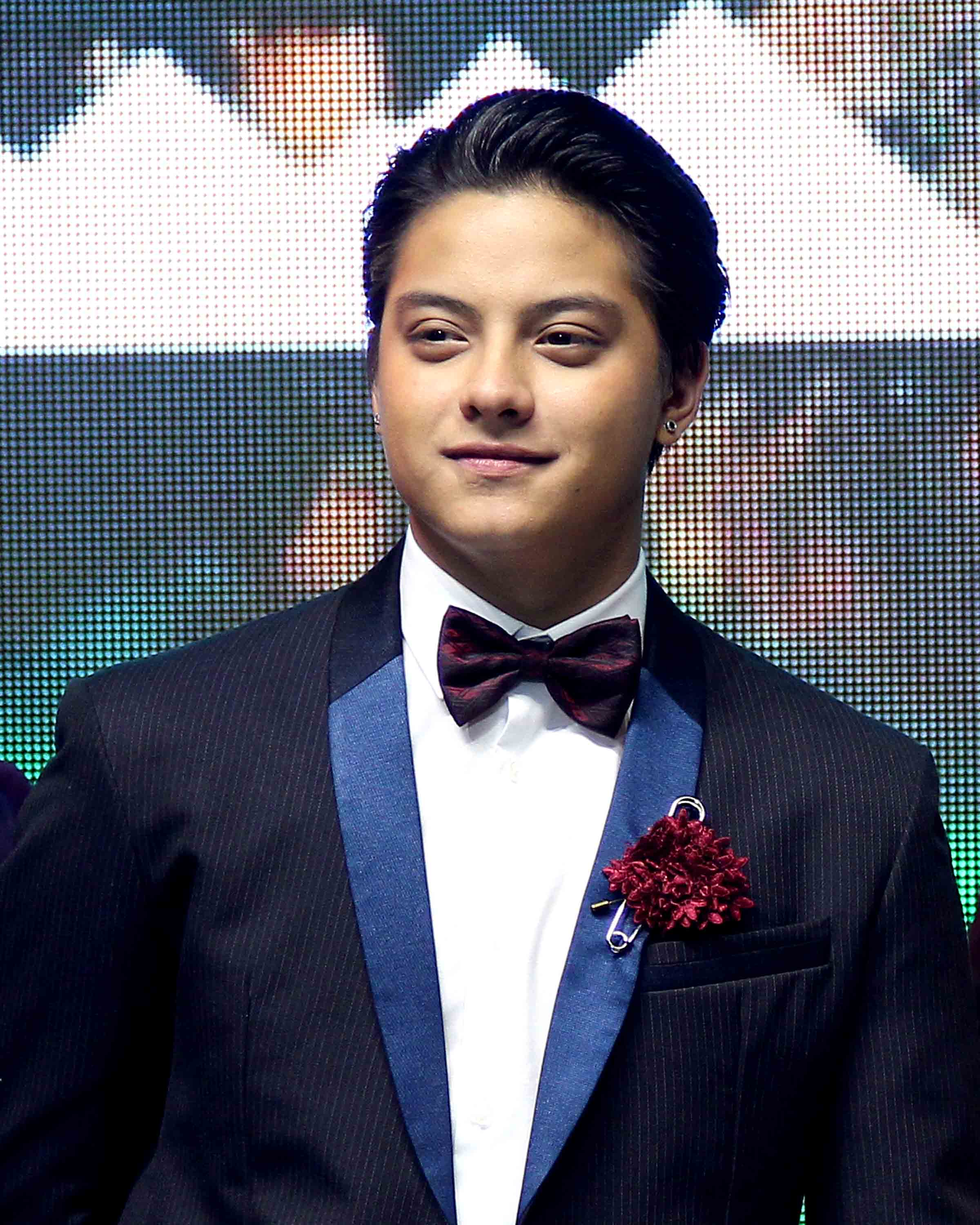
Daniel Padilla

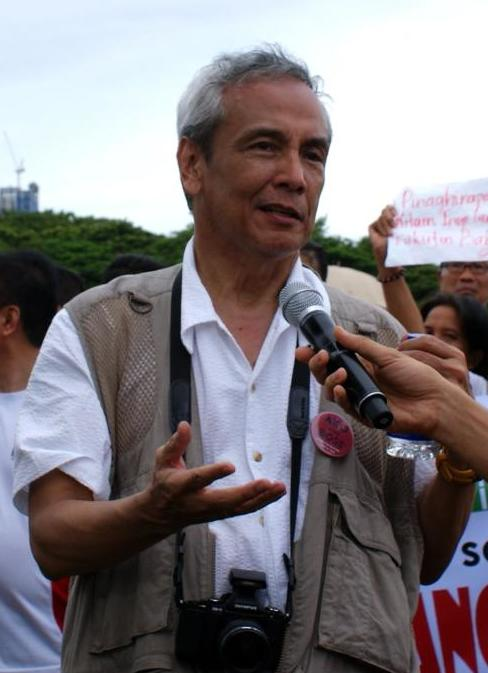
Jim Paredes

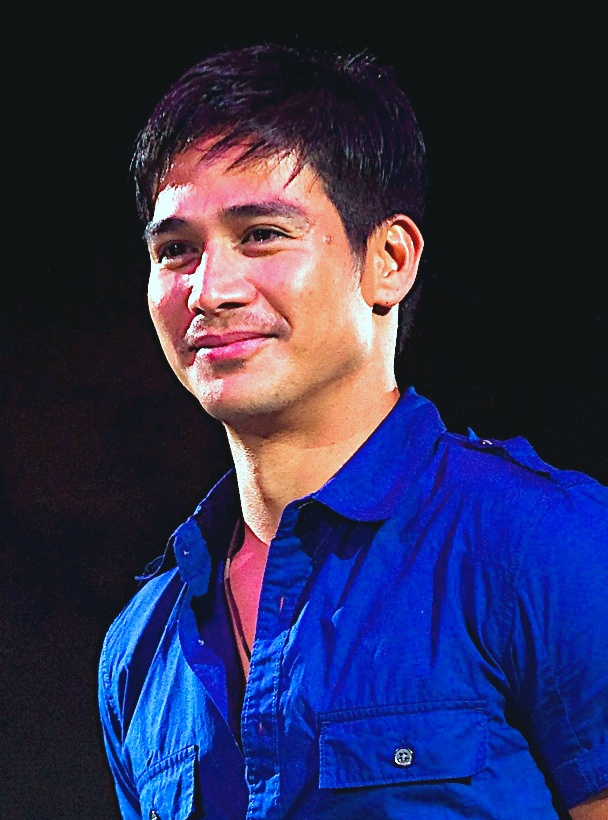
Piolo Pascual

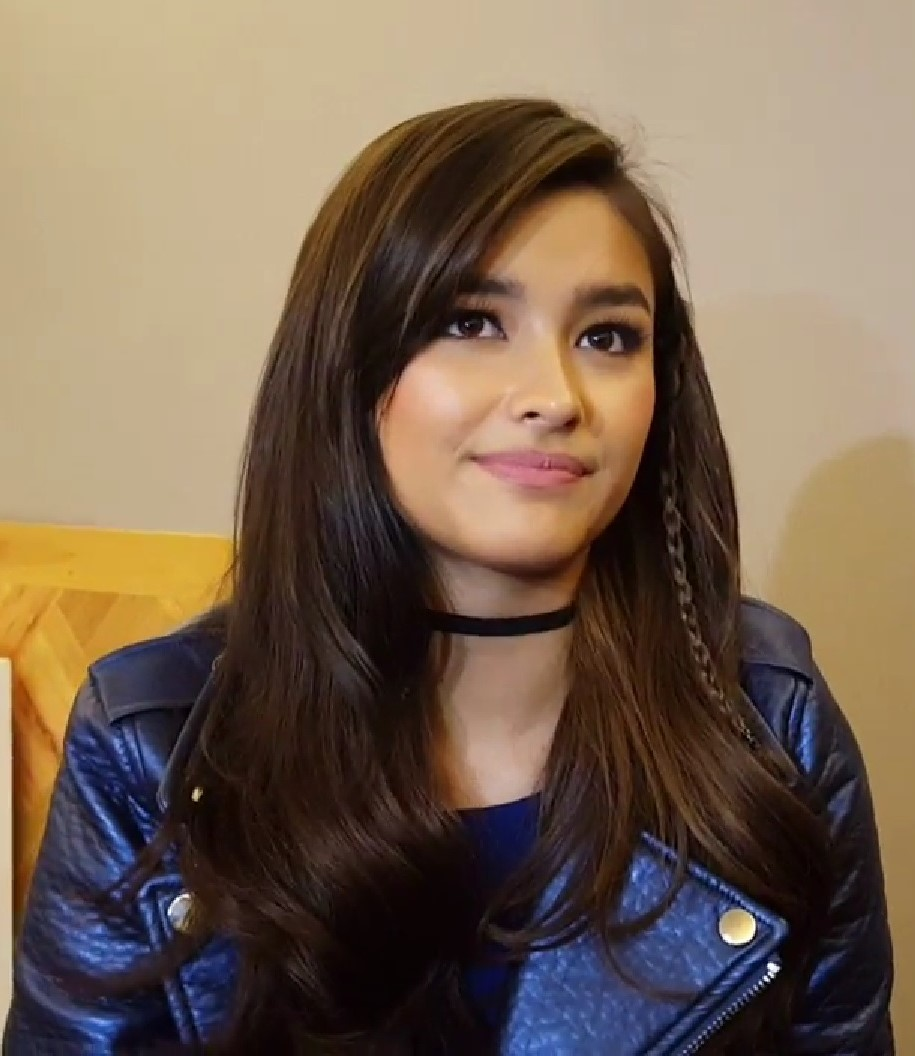
Liza Soberano

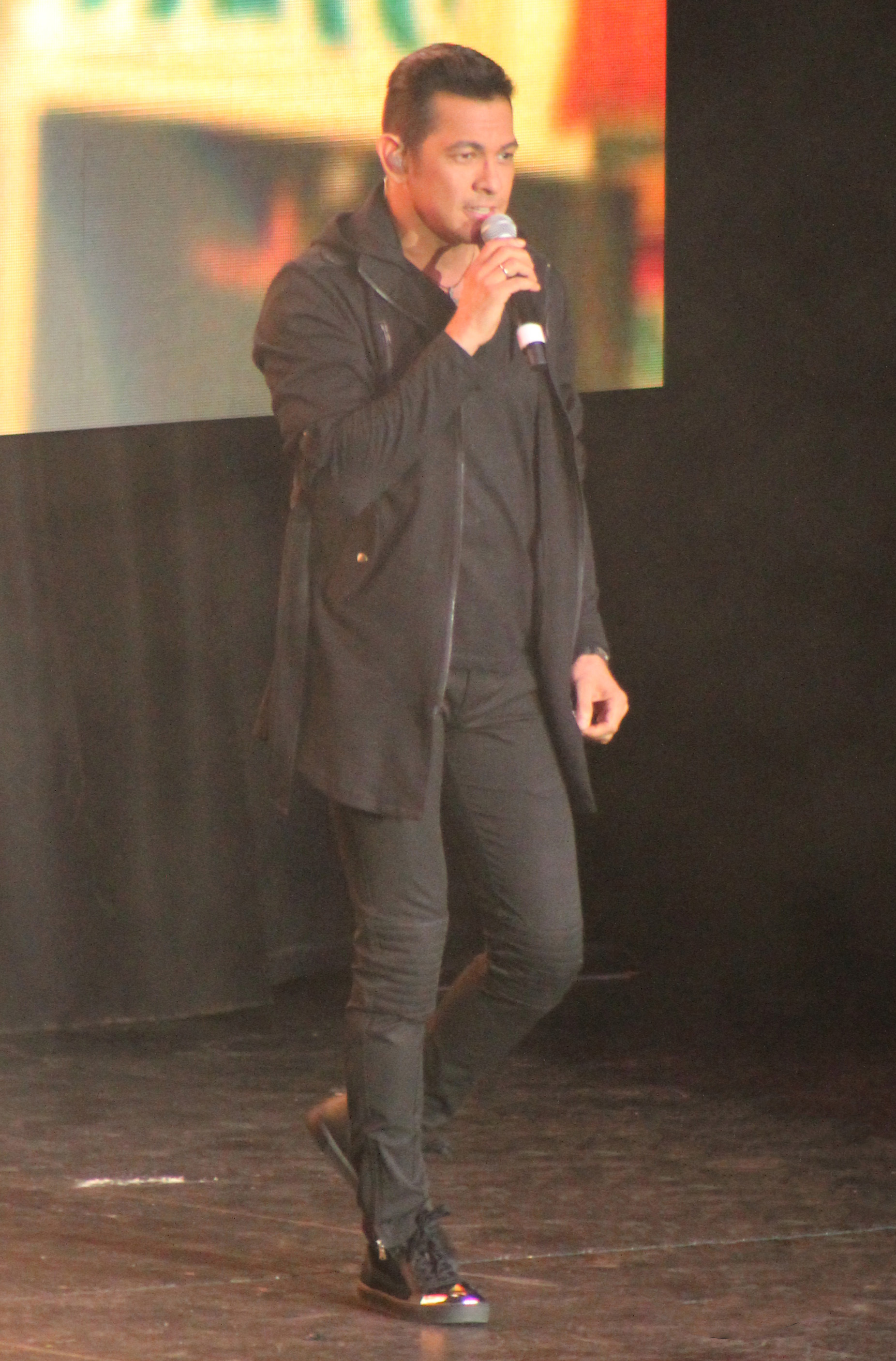
Gary Valenciano

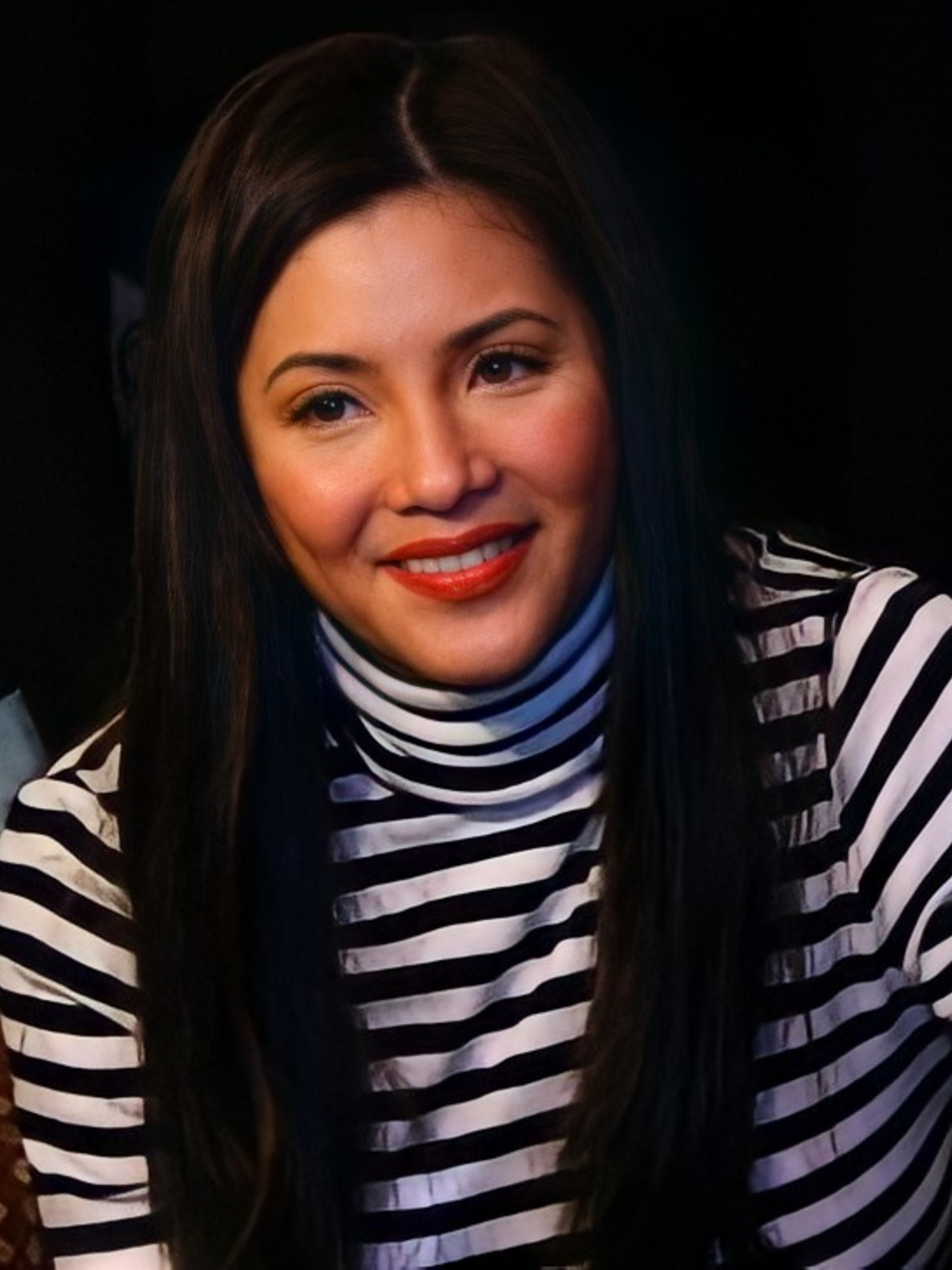
Regine Velasquez

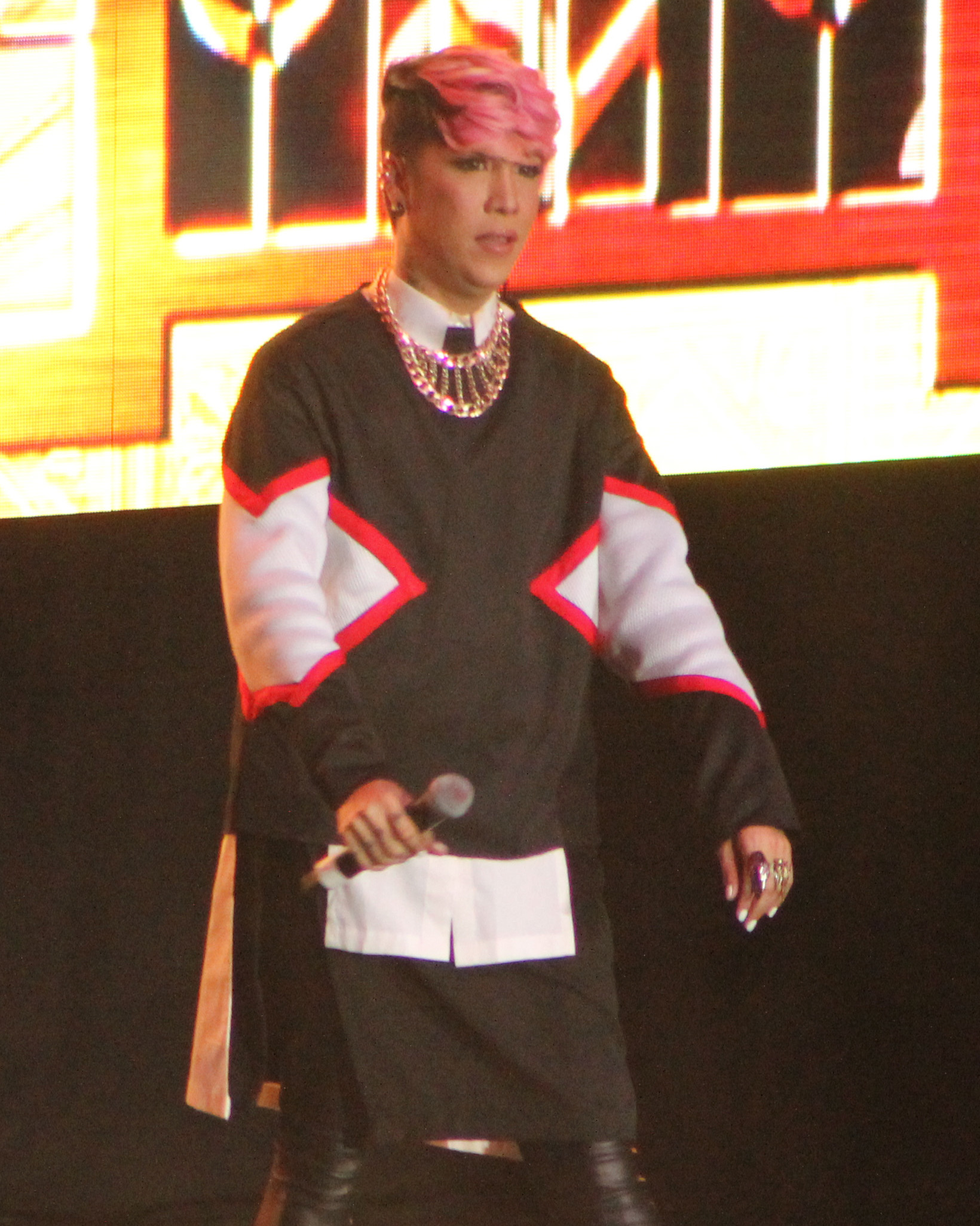
Vice Ganda

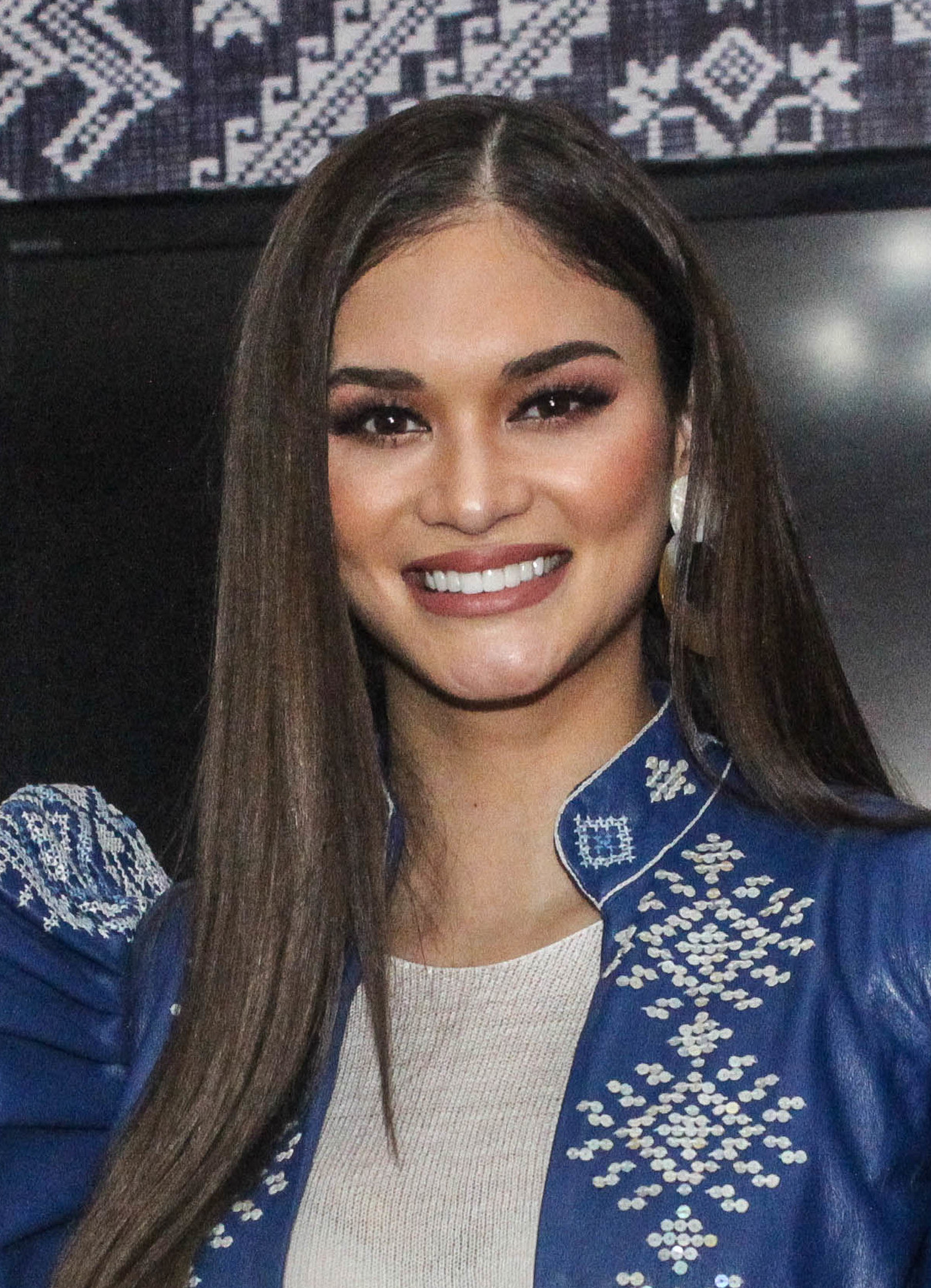
Pia Wurtzbach

- Dong Abay, rock musician, singer-songwriter (founding member of Yano)
- Andi Abaya, actress
- Carla Abellana, actress
- Astarte Abraham, theater actress, voice actress
- Susan Africa, actress
- Karla Aguas, radio personality
- Yayo Aguila, actress
- LA Aguinaldo, model
- Marvin Agustin, actor and restaurateur
- Angela Alarcon, actress
- Ivana Alawi, actress
- JC Alcantara, actor
- Kyline Alcantara, actress
- Leila Alcasid, songwriter
- Ogie Alcasid, singer-songwriter, actor, host
- Bea Alonzo, actress
- Pinky Amador, actress, singer, model, host
- Boots Anson-Roa, actress, columnist, 2004 senatorial candidate
- Angel Aquino, actress, model, activist
- Kris Aquino, television host, actress, producer, socialite, businesswoman, daughter of President Corazon Aquino, sister of President Benigno Aquino III
- John Arcilla, actor
- Delamar Arias, former radio personality
- Autotelic, rock band
- Rita Avila, actress, author
- Jong Azores, singer
- RK Bagatsing, actor
- Kira Balinger, actress
- Claudia Barretto, singer
- Julia Barretto, actress, singer
- Marjorie Barretto, actress, Councilor of Caloocan from the 2nd district (2007–2013)
- Bayang Barrios, singer and musician
- Christian Bautista, singer, actor, TV host
- Ben&Ben, band
- Jacob Benedicto, actor, model, singer and host
- Janine Berdin, singer
- Kris Bernal, actress
- Kathryn Bernardo, actress, singer
- Bea Binene, actress
- Rammy Bitong, radio personality and DJ
- Jameson Blake, actor
- The Bloomfields, pop rock band
- AC Bonifacio, dancer, singer, internet personality
- Andrea Brillantes, actress
- K Brosas, television host, comedian, singer, actress
- Shamaine Buencamino, actress, mental health advocate
- Ely Buendia, musician, lead vocalist and guitarist of Eraserheads
- Noel Cabangon, folk singer, composer
- Alex Calleja, stand-up comedian
- Iza Calzado, actress, television host, dancer, model
- Elijah Canlas, actor
- Melai Cantiveros, television host, actress
- Lolita Carbon, singer-songwriter
- Dolly Ann Carvajal, entertainment columnist
- Albie Casiño, actor
- Ella Cayabyab, actress
- Ryza Cenon, actress
- DJ Chacha, radio personality
- Jose Mari Chan, singer-songwriter, business executive
- Ricci Chan, actor, singer
- Dawn Chang, actress, dancer
- Chicosci, band
- Kim Chiu, actress, singer, television host
- Dasuri Choi, dancer and singer
- David Chua, actor, model, director, basketball player
- Color it Red, band
- Noel Comia Jr., actor
- The Company, musical vocal group
- KC Concepcion, actress, singer, television host, humanitarian, stepdaughter of Francis Pangilinan (has openly endorsed Pangilinan only)
- Sam Concepcion, singer, actor, television personality
- Yeng Constantino, singer-songwriter, host
- Benedict Cua, vlogger, actor and singer
- Sharon Cuneta, actress, singer, television host, socialite, wife of Francis Pangilinan
- Anne Curtis, actress, model, television host, singer, UNICEF Goodwill Ambassador
- Curtismith, rapper, singer-songwriter
- Johnoy Danao, musician
- Ebe Dancel, musician, former member of Sugarfree
- Dingdong Dantes, actor and host
- The Dawn, rock band
- DayDream, P-pop girl group
- Jex de Castro, singer
- Jane De Leon, actress, model
- Tweetie de Leon-Gonzalez, former model, television host, entrepreneur
- Kokoy de Santos, actor, television personality
- JC de Vera, actor, host, model
- Enchong Dee, actor, model
- RJ dela Fuente, singer
- Ashley Diaz, actress
- Francine Diaz, actress
- Ogie Diaz, comedian, actor, entertainment reporter
- Dicta License, rock band
- Zephanie Dimaranan, singer, Idol Philippines winner
- Charlie Dizon, actress
- Mylene Dizon, actress
- Robi Domingo, VJ, actor, dancer, television host
- Tippy Dos Santos, singer, actress
- Chuckie Dreyfus, actor
- Bullet Dumas, singer-songwriter
- Jason Dy, singer and actor
- Kyle Echarri, actor and singer
- Jake Ejercito, actor, son of President Joseph Estrada
- Bituin Escalante, actress, host
- Rhen Escaño, actress
- Vivoree Esclito, actress, singer, television personality
- Darren Espanto, singer, runner-up in The Voice Kids
- John Estrada, actor
- Kaila Estrada, actress
- KD Estrada, actor, singer
- Jaime Fabregas, actor, musical scorer
- Topper Fabregas, actor, theater director
- Seth Fedelin, actor
- Kimpoy Feliciano, YouTuber, actor
- Aya Fernandez, actress
- Noel Ferrer, producer, talent manager
- Chienna Filomeno, actress
- Marvin Fojas, TikTok personality, vlogger
- Chai Fonacier, singer and actress
- Tin Gamboa, radio personality
- Gabbi Garcia, actress, host, singer, vlogger
- Joshua Garcia, actor, model and dancer
- Boboy Garovillo, composer, member of APO Hiking Society
- Elmer Gatchalian, screenwriter, playwright, editor, translator
- Xia Gaza, cosplayer
- Janno Gibbs, singer, actor
- Cherie Gil, actress
- Gloc-9, rapper, singer, songwriter
- Beatrice Gomez, beauty queen (Miss Universe Philippines 2021 winner), model, entrepreneur, sergeant of the Philippine Navy
- Shanaia Gomez, actress
- Jay Gonzaga, actor
- Bianca Gonzalez, model, television host
- Boom Gonzalez, radio personality and sports commentator
- Catriona Gray, beauty queen (Miss Universe 2018 winner), model, television host, singer, social advocate
- Robbie Guevara, theater actor, director, producer, writer, editor
- Janine Gutierrez, actress, television host, commercial model
- Mela Habijan, beauty queen (Miss Trans Global 2020 winner), writer, actress, content creator, 2016 candidate for Councilor of Marikina from its 2nd district (Nationalist People's Coalition)
- Syd Hartha, singer
- Quark Henares, director
- Hey Moonshine, rock band
- Viel Iligan-Velasquez, internet personality, vlogger
- Imago, rock band
- Agot Isidro, actress
- The Itchyworms, rock band
- Antoinette Jadaone, filmmaker
- Danny Javier, singer, member of APO Hiking Society
- Jose Javier Reyes, film director
- Jaya, soul singer, rapper, record producer, dancer, presenter
- DJ Jhaiho, radio personality
- Luke Jickain, model, actor
- Eunice Jorge, lead vocalist of Gracenote
- Cedrick Juan, actor
- Richard Juan, actor, model, host and TV personality
- Juan Karlos, rock band
- The Juans, band
- Kakie, musician, daughter of Francis Pangilinan
- Kamikazee, rock band
- Angela Ken, actress, singer-songwriter
- Kring Kim, host
- Helga Krapf, actress
- Krissy Achino, comedian and internet personality
- Shine Kuk, actress, dancer, singer and co-host
- Kyla, singer
- Fatima Lagueras, singer
- Joel Lamangan, film director, television director, actor
- John Lapus, actor, host, comedian, film and television director
- Vance Larena, actor
- Maricel Laxa, actress, sister-in-law of Francis Pangilinan
- Leanne & Naara, musical duo
- Kuh Ledesma, singer, actress
- Celeste Legaspi, singer
- Jim Libiran, film director, writer, poet
- David Licauco, actor, model
- Angel Locsin, actress, activist
- Rio Locsin, actress
- Lola Amour, rock band
- Mara Lopez, actress, surfer
- Maria Isabel Lopez, beauty queen (Miss Universe Philippines 1982 winner), actress, model
- Ella Eiveren Lubag, model, activist
- Nadine Lustre, actress
- Macoy Dubs, comedian
- Arkin Magalona, singer
- Elmo Magalona, actor, singer
- Maxene Magalona, actress, model, host and yoga instructor
- Pia Magalona, actress, composer
- Saab Magalona, actress, vlogger, singer, member of Cheats
- Jolina Magdangal, singer, actress, television presenter, entrepreneur
- Shaina Magdayao, actress, singer, model
- Inka Magnaye, voice actress
- Belle Mariano, actress, singer, model
- Carmi Martin, actress, model, comedian
- Leo Martinez, actor, comedian, director
- Mayonnaise, rock band
- Melissa Mendez, actress, 2022 candidate for Councilor of Quezon City from its 2nd district (Aksyon Demokratiko)
- Aljon Mendoza, actor
- Gabe Mercado, actor
- Jennylyn Mercado, actress, singer, songwriter
- Kelsey Merritt, model, first Filipino to walk in the Victoria's Secret Fashion Show
- MilesExperience, rock band
- Mimiyuuuh, YouTuber
- Margaux Montana, actress
- Moonstar88, rock band
- Arlene Muhlach, actress
- Nikko Natividad actor, model and dancer
- Nuel Crisostomo Naval, director
- Leah Navarro, singer, activist
- Elha Nympha, singer, The Voice Kids (Philippine season 2) winner
- Miles Ocampo, actress
- Jane Oineza, actress, model, singer
- Kaori Oinuma, actress, model
- Gani Oro, newscaster, 2022 candidate for Councilor of Quezon City from its 5th district (Aksyon Demokratiko)
- Otakoyakisoba, media personalities
- Daniel Padilla, actor, singer
- Gabby Padilla, actress
- Phi Palmos, theater actor, singer, writer
- Angelica Panganiban, actress, television host
- Candy Pangilinan, actress, comedienne
- Donny Pangilinan, actor, model, singer, television host, nephew of Francis Pangilinan
- Hannah Pangilinan, YouTuber, niece of Francis Pangilinan
- Rochelle Pangilinan, dancer, former member of the SexBomb Dancers
- Jim Paredes, singer-songwriter, member of APO Hiking Society
- Bodjie Pascua, actor, former television host
- Piolo Pascual, actor, singer, model
- Heaven Peralejo, actress, singer
- Paula Peralejo, former actress, businesswoman
- Rica Peralejo, writer, content creator, former actress
- Cherry Pie Picache, actress
- Aurora Pijuan, beauty queen (Miss International 1970 winner), model, activist
- Pipay, vlogger, TikTok personality
- Pokwang, comedian, actress, television host, singer
- Camille Prats, actress, television personality
- Yassi Pressman, actress, singer, host
- Prettier Than Pink, musical group
- Victor Pring, radio host, music producer, entrepreneur, 2022 candidate for Councilor of Quezon City from its 2nd district (independent)
- Floy Quintos, playwright, film and television director, poet
- Precious Lara Quigaman, actress, host, beauty queen (Miss International 2005 winner)
- Patrick Quiroz, actor, singer
- Sky Quizon, internet personality
- Maris Racal, actress, television personality, singer
- Khalil Ramos, actor, singer
- Miko Raval, model, actor
- Lance Reblando, singer, actor
- Chloe Redondo, singer
- James Reid, actor and singer
- FM Reyes, director
- Mandy Reyes, director
- Johnrey Rivas, hunk actor, model and singer
- Rivermaya, rock band
- Marian Rivera, actress
- Rapahel Robes, model, actor
- Vic Robinson, singer, actor
- Ana Roces, actress
- Bretman Rock, beauty influencer, social media personality
- Anthony Rosaldo, singer, actor and model
- Donita Rose, actress, chef, former VJ
- SAB, singer-songwriter
- John Mark Saga, singer
- Mika Salamanca, TikTok personality
- Rhap Salazar, singer, former child actor
- Janella Salvador, actress, singer, television personality
- Maja Salvador, actress (endorsed Tito Sotto for vice–president)
- Sam YG, radio and television personality
- Paolo Sandejas, singer
- Julie Anne San Jose, actress, singer
- Sharlene San Pedro, actress, singer
- Migs Santilan, Radio DJ
- Aicelle Santos, singer, actress
- Erik Santos, singer
- Claro Saplala III, actor, content creator, YouTuber
- Romnick Sarmenta, actor
- Randy See, model, actor, TV show host, Mr. Chinatown 2013
- Sitti, singer, actress
- Liza Soberano, actress
- Fifth Solomon, actor, director
- Carmen Soo, model, actress
- Maricel Soriano, actress, model, television host
- Jodi Sta. Maria, actress
- Tanya Markova, rock band
- Myke Tatung, celebrity chef
- Sharwin Tee, celebrity chef
- Kakki Teodoro, actress, entrepreneur
- Jon Timmons, actor, model and TV personality
- Dennis Trillo, actor, model
- Tropical Depression, reggae band
- True Faith, rock band
- Mitch Valdes, singer, actress, television presenter
- Nikki Valdez, actress, singer
- Gabriel Valenciano, dancer, nephew of Francis Pangilinan
- Gary Valenciano, singer-songwriter, dancer, actor, host, UNICEF Goodwill Ambassador, brother-in-law of Francis Pangilinan
- Kiana Valenciano, singer-songwriter, niece of Francis Pangilinan
- Tuesday Vargas, singer, actress and comedian
- Janina Vela, YouTuber
- Regine Velasquez, singer, actress, producer
- Kylie Verzosa, beauty queen (Miss International 2016 winner), model, actress
- Vice Ganda, comedian, host, actor, singer
- Loi Villarama, comedian, entertainment reporter, YouTuber
- Jona Viray, singer
- Nyoy Volante, singer-songwriter
- The Vowels They Orbit, alternative pop band
- Maureen Wroblewitz, actress, model, beauty queen (Miss Universe Philippines 2021 runner-up, Asia's Next Top Model (season 5) winner)
- Pia Wurtzbach, beauty queen (Miss Universe 2015 winner), model, actress
- Tim Yap, media personality, entrepreneur
- Lauren Young, actress, model
- Amanda Zamora, actress

=== Sports figures ===
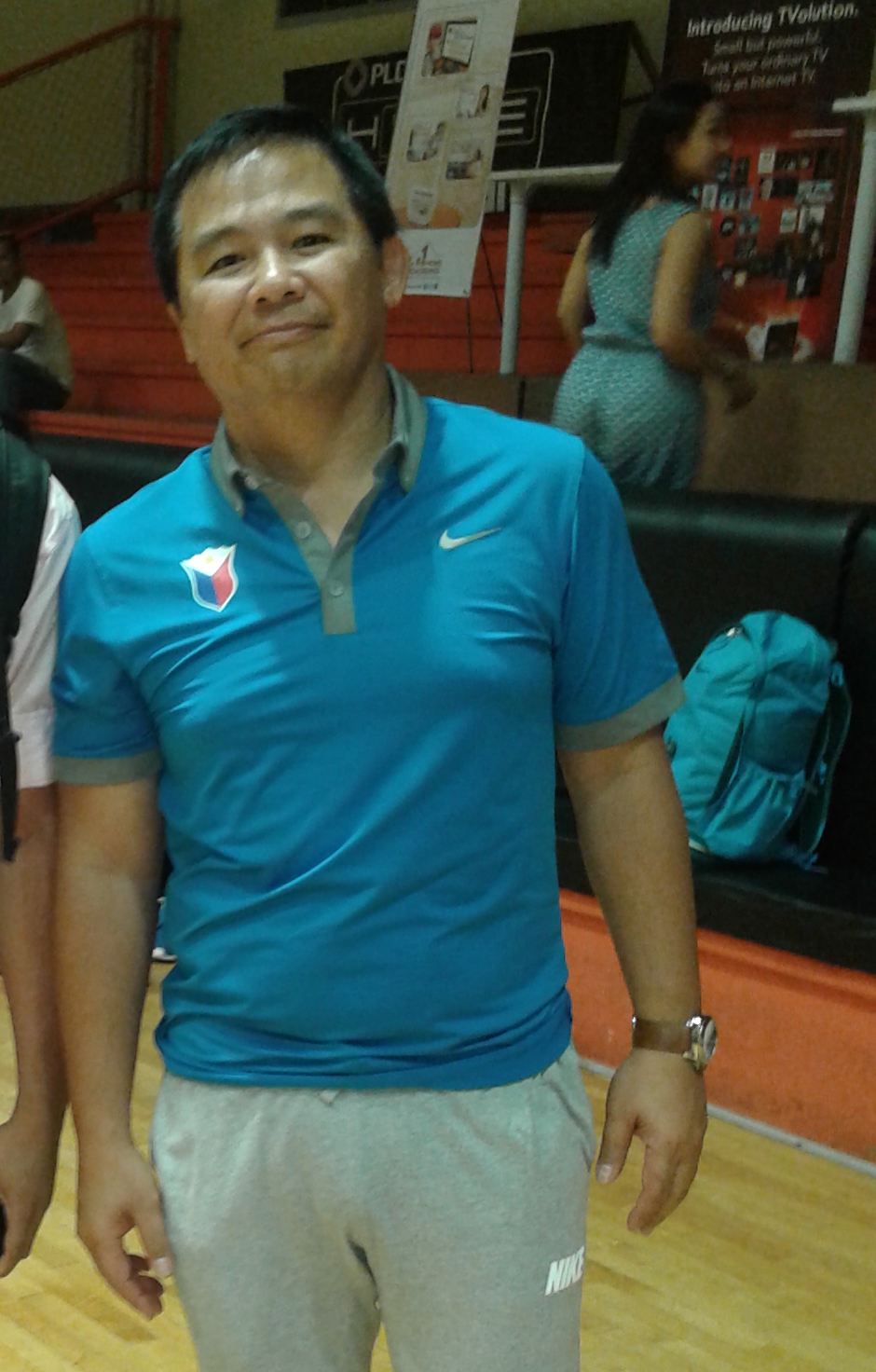
Chot Reyes

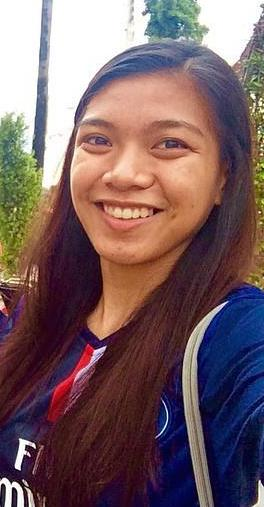
Alyssa Valdez

- Johnny Abarrientos, former basketball player (Alaska Aces, Philippines men's national basketball team), basketball assistant coach (FEU Tamaraws, Magnolia Hotshots)
- Maruja Banaticla, former volleyball player (UST Golden Tigresses, Smart-Maynilad Net Spikers)
- Kathy Bersola, volleyball player (UP Lady Fighting Maroons, Perlas Spikers)
- Tots Carlos, volleyball player (UP Lady Fighting Maroons, Creamline Cool Smashers)
- Mozzy Crisologo-Ravena, volleyball analyst, former volleyball player (UST Golden Tigresses, Philippines women's national volleyball team)
- Apple David, sports reporter, host
- Bea de Leon, volleyball player (Ateneo Lady Eagles, Choco Mucho Flying Titans)
- Ayel Estrañero, volleyball player (UP Lady Fighting Maroons, Cignal HD Spikers)
- Jem Ferrer, volleyball player (Ateneo Lady Eagles, Choco Mucho Flying Titans)
- Ponggay Gaston, former volleyball player (Ateneo Lady Eagles, Choco Mucho Flying Titans)
- Dave Ildefonso, basketball player (Ateneo Blue Eagles, NU Bulldogs)
- Rex Intal, volleyball player (Ateneo Blue Spikers, Cignal HD Spikers, Philippines men's national volleyball team)
- Jojo Lastimosa, former basketball player (Alaska Milkmen, Philippines men's national basketball team), basketball assistant coach (NLEX Road Warriors)
- Denden Lazaro-Revilla, volleyball player (Ateneo Lady Eagles, Choco Mucho Flying Titans)
- Gia "Jeeya" Llanes, esports player (Philippines women's national esports team)
- Maddie Madayag, volleyball player (Ateneo Lady Eagles, Choco Mucho Flying Titans, Philippines women's national volleyball team)
- Ysay Marasigan, volleyball player (Cignal HD Spikers, Philippines men's national volleyball team)
- Jia Morado, volleyball player (Ateneo Lady Eagles, Creamline Cool Smashers, Philippines women's national volleyball team)
- Aiyana Perlas, sports reporter, host
- Ed Picson, retired sports commentator, columnist, president of the Association of Boxing Alliances in the Philippines
- Ish Polvorosa, volleyball player (Ateneo Blue Spikers, Cignal HD Spikers, Philippines men's national volleyball team)
- Olsen Racela, former basketball player (San Miguel Beermen, Philippines men's national basketball team), basketball coach (FEU Tamaraws, Barangay Ginebra San Miguel)
- Nikko Ramos, sports commentator, former radio personality, editor-in-chief of Slam Philippines
- Kiefer Ravena, basketball player (Ateneo Blue Eagles, NLEX Road Warriors, Shiga Lakestars, Philippines men's national basketball team)
- Chot Reyes, basketball head coach (TNT Tropang Giga, Philippines men's national basketball team), president, CEO and officer in charge of TV5 Network (2016–2019)
- Mika Reyes, volleyball player (De La Salle Lady Spikers, PLDT High Speed Hitters, Petron Blaze Spikers, Philippine women's national volleyball team)
- Camille Rodriguez, football player (Ateneo Lady Blue Booters, Kaya F.C., Philippines women's national football team)
- Sev Sarmenta, sports commentator, communications lecturer at the Ateneo de Manila University
- Wensh Tiu, former volleyball player (De La Salle Lady Spikers, Generika-Ayala Lifesavers, Petro Gazz Angels)
- Karen Toyoshima, kendoka, actress
- Alyssa Valdez, volleyball player (Ateneo Lady Eagles, Creamline Cool Smashers, Philippines women's national volleyball team)
- Deanna Wong, volleyball player (Ateneo Lady Eagles, Choco Mucho Flying Titans, Philippines women's national volleyball team)

=== Visual artists, writers, and cultural workers ===
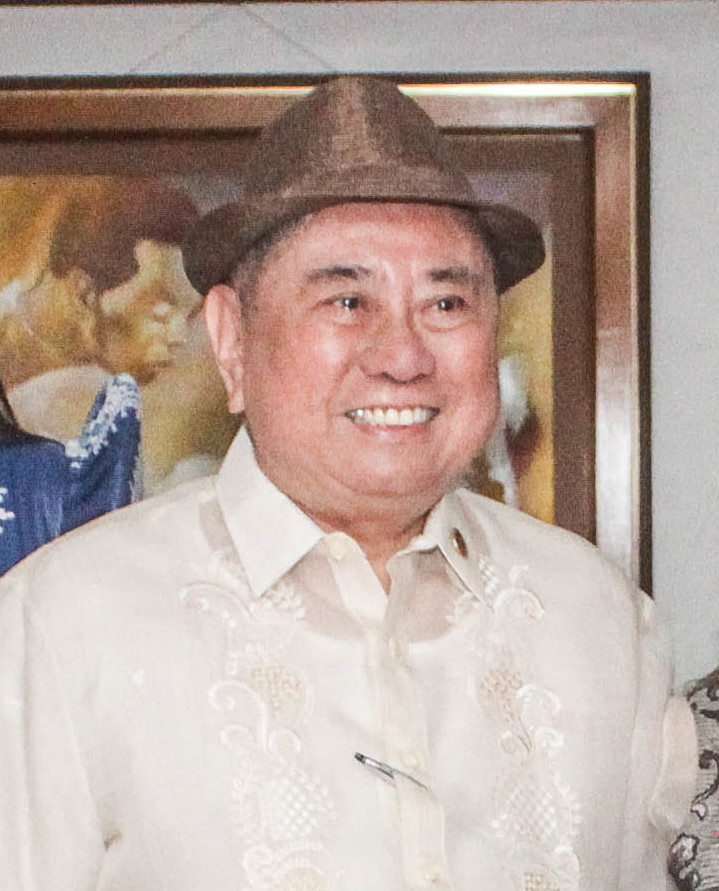
Virgilio S. Almario

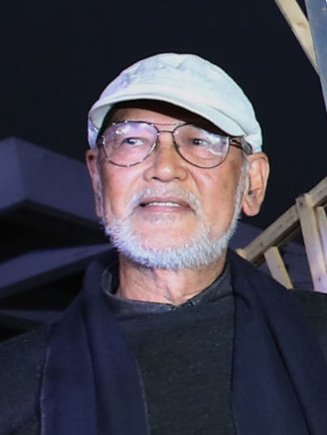
Benedicto Cabrera

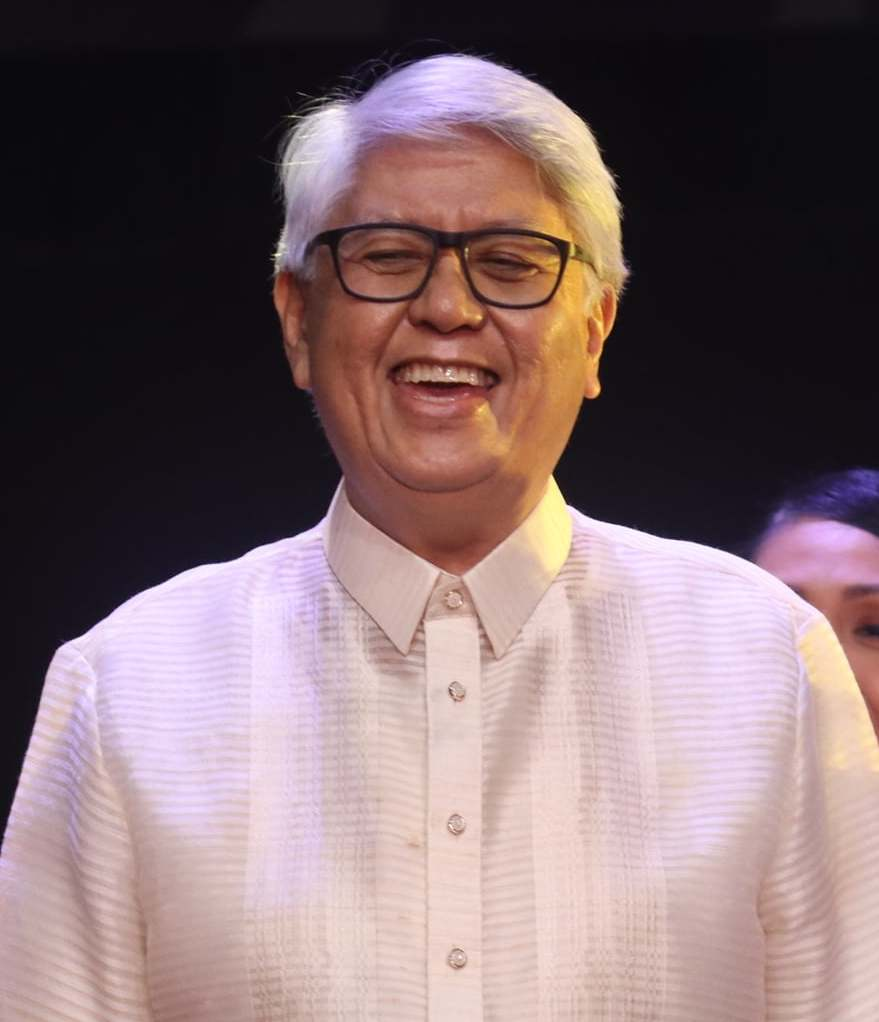
Ryan Cayabyab

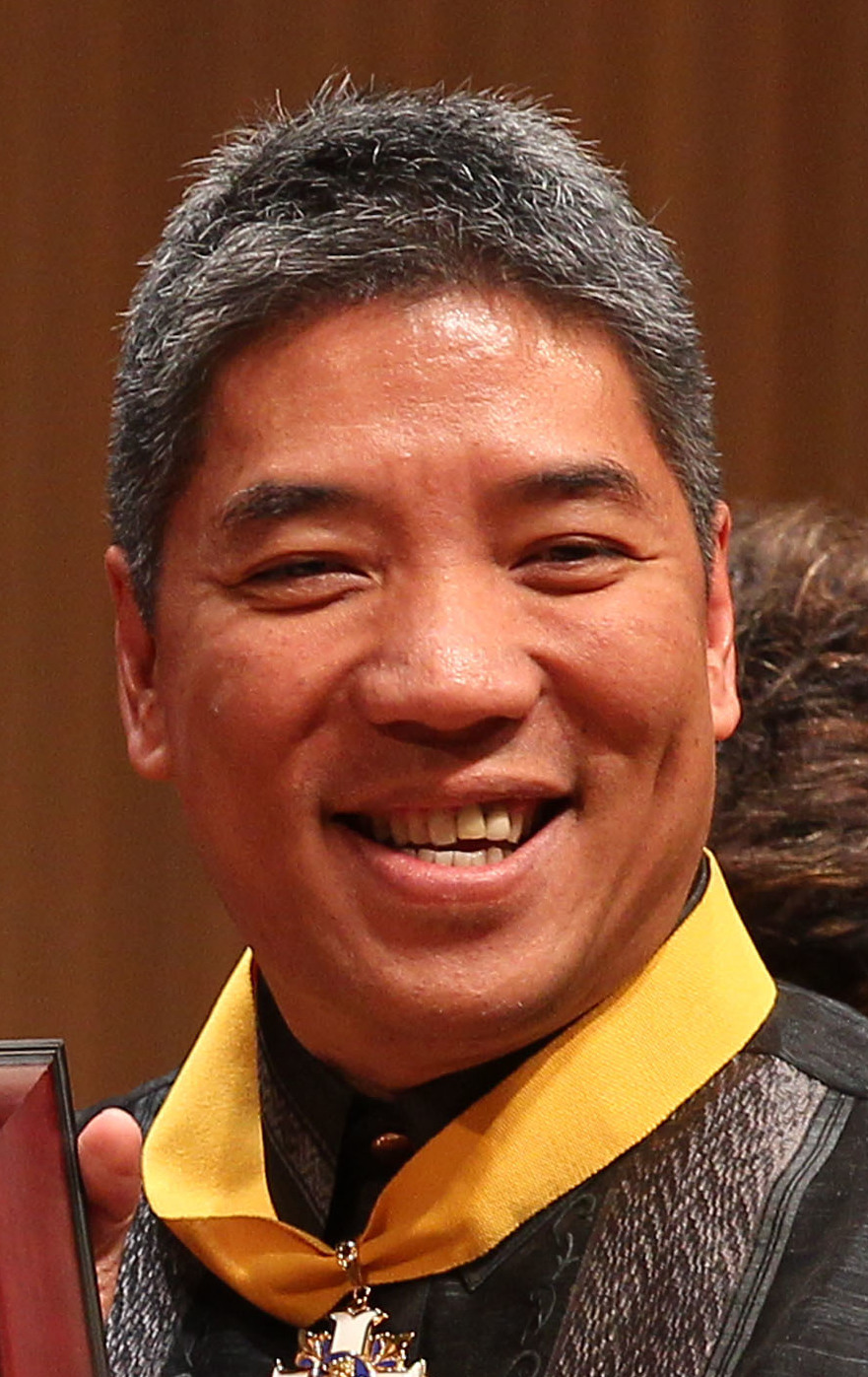
Ambeth Ocampo

- Gémino Abad, literary critic, National Artist for Literature
- Pio Abad, visual artist, activist
- Emily Abrera, adwoman, chairman emeritus of McCann Worldgroup Philippines, President of the Cultural Center of the Philippines (2010–2018)
- Marvin Aceron, lawyer and executive publisher of San Anselmo Publications, Inc.
- Robert Alejandro, visual artist and television personality
- Virgilio S. Almario, author, poet, critic, translator, editor, teacher, cultural manager, National Artist for Literature, Chairperson of the Komisyon sa Wikang Filipino (2013–2020), Chairman of the National Commission for Culture and the Arts (2017–2019)
- Yñigo Miguel Almeda, poet
- Gina Apostol, novelist
- Joi Barrios, poet, activist, scriptwriter, actress, translator, and academic
- Merlinda Bobis, writer
- Lualhati Bautista, novelist
- Elmer Borlongan, visual artist
- Plet Bolipata Borlongan, visual artist
- Luis Cabalquinto, poet and writer
- Benedicto Cabrera, painter, National Artist for Visual Arts
- Ryan Cayabyab, conductor, composer, National Artist for Music
- Xiao Chua, public historian, academic, television personality
- Jose Dalisay Jr., writer, poet, activist
- Noel Romero del Prado, writer and author
- Luis H. Francia, poet, playwright, journalist, nonfiction writer
- Toym Imao, visual artist
- Jenny Jamora, theater actress, President and CEO of the Philippine Theater Actors Guild, Inc.
- Mookie Katigbak-Lacuesta, poet and nonfiction writer
- Kerwin King, visual artist, photographer
- Alex Lacson, poet, lawyer, businessman, civil society leader, 2022 senatorial candidate under Team Robredo–Pangilinan
- Moira Lang, film screenwriter and LGBT rights advocate
- Marra PL. Lanot, poet, essayist, and freelance journalist
- Matthew Lopez, art researcher, independent curator, art advisor, author
- Lisa Macuja-Elizalde, ballet dancer, businesswoman
- Raxenne Maniquiz, graphic designer, illustrator
- Leeroy New, visual artist
- Ambeth Ocampo, public historian, academic, cultural administrator, journalist, author, independent curator, Chairperson of the National Historical Commission of the Philippines (2002–2011), Chairman of the National Commission for Culture and the Arts (2005–2007)
- Bob Ong, author
- Bibeth Orteza, writer and director
- Mae Paner, performance artist, activist
- Kevin Eric Raymundo (alias Tarantadong Kalbo), graphic designer, comic book artist
- Alice Reyes, choreographer, dancer, teacher, director, producer, National Artist for Dance
- Ninotchka Rosca, author, poet, journalist, activist
- Ramon Santos, composer, ethnomusicologist, educator, National Artist for Music
- Beverly W. Siy, writer and translator
- Kenny Tai, artist
- Kidlat Tahimik, film director, writer, actor, National Artist for Film
- Claude Tayag, visual artist, restaurateur, and food writer
- Emmanuel Quintos Velasco, poet
- Lester Villarama, photographer
- Alfred Yuson, author, novelist, poet

=== Organizations ===
==== Advocacy groups ====
- Alternative Mobility (AltMobility)
- Life Cycles
- Move As One Coalition

==== Cooperatives ====
- Alliance of Pavia, Iloilo Jeepney Operators and Drivers Association
- Banawa Transport Cooperative
- Bohol Island Operators and Drivers Multipurpose Cooperative
- Carmen Drivers and Conductors Multi-Purpose Cooperative
- Cebu Integrated Transport Service Multi-Purpose Cooperative (CITRASCO)
- Compostela Transport Cooperative
- First Community Credit Cooperative
- Mandaue–Lapu-Lapu Transport Cooperative
- Mandaue Sabang Danao Multicab Drivers and Operators
- Pit-os Talamban Transport Cooperative
- United Sugbo Transport Cooperative
- Visayas United Drivers Transport Cooperative (VUDTRASCO)

==== Dioceses and religious groups ====
- Clergy for the Moral Choice
- Council of Coordinators of the Ang Ligaya ng Panginoon Community
- Council of the Laity of the Roman Catholic Apostolic Vicariate of Calapan
- Council of the Laity of the Roman Catholic Apostolic Vicariate of Taytay
- Council of the Laity of the Roman Catholic Archdiocese of Lipa
- Council of the Laity of the Roman Catholic Archdiocese of Manila
- Council of the Laity of the Roman Catholic Diocese of Legazpi
- Couples for Christ International Council
- DaKaTeo Philippines
- Daughters of Charity of Saint Vincent de Paul in the Philippines
- De La Salle Brothers Philippine District
- Ecumenical Bishops Forum
- Kalookan Laity for Principled Politics
- Living Laudato' Si Philippines
- Order of Friars Minor (Franciscans) – Province of San Pedro Bautista
- Pari Madre Misyonero Para Kay Leni
- Roman Catholic Archdiocese of Cáceres
- Roman Catholic Archdiocese of Jaro
- Roman Catholic Diocese of Novaliches
- Sangguniang Laiko ng Diyosesis ng Romblon
- Sangguniang Laiko ng Pilipinas
- Tahanan ng Panginoon
- United Church of Christ in the Philippines
- United Imams of the Philippines – ZamBaSulTa Chapter (previously endorsed Isko Moreno)

==== Educational institutions ====
- Adamson University
- Angelicum School Iloilo
- Ateneo de Manila University
- Ateneo de Naga University
- Central Philippine University
- De La Salle University
- Holy Angel University
- Saint Louis University
- San Beda University
- Universidad de Sta. Isabel, Robredo's alma mater
- University of Baguio
- University of the Cordilleras
- University of Santo Tomas

==== Sectoral groups ====
- Agriculturists for Leni-Kiko
- Cordillera Peoples Alliance
- League of Organic Agriculture Municipalities, Cities and Provinces of the Philippines
- Pagkakaisa ng mga Samahan ng mga Tsuper at Opereytor Nationwide (Piston)

==== Trade unions ====
- Federation of Free Workers
- Kapatiran sa Dalawang Gulong
- Kilusang Mayo Uno
- Nagkaisa! Labor Coalition
- National Confederation of Transportworkers Union
- National Congress of Unions in the Sugar Industry in the Philippines
- National Union of Bank Employees
- Sentro ng Nagkakaisa at Progresibong Manggagawa

== See also ==
- List of Bongbong Marcos 2022 presidential campaign endorsements
