= List of Ateneo de Manila University alumni =

This table lists notable alumni affiliated with the Ateneo de Manila University (formerly known as the Escuela Municipal de Manila from 1859 to 1865 and the Ateneo Municipal de Manila from 1865 to 1891), from grade school through graduate and professional schools, during its long history dating back to 1859. The list includes actors, artists, athletes, businesspeople, musicians, politicians, and writers who have attended the university, as well as those who have received honorary degrees.

== Legend ==
Notes and abbreviations used

- Individuals who may belong in multiple sections appear only in one (their most prominent), with the exception of faculty members who were also alumni.
- An empty class year or school/degree box indicates that the information is unknown or not applicable.
- "DNG" indicates the alumnus or alumna attended but did not graduate; year(s) of attendance are included if available.

Schools

- GS – Grade School
- HS – High School (until 2016)

- JHS – Junior High School (since 2016)
- SHS – Senior High School (since 2016)

- MDM – Municipal de Manila College (1859−1891)
- SAS – School of Arts and Sciences (1891−2000)
- LS – Loyola Schools (since 2000)

- SOH – School of Humanities
- SOM – School of Management
- SOSE – School of Science and Engineering
- SOSS – School of Social Sciences

- PS – Professional Schools

- Law – School of Law (since 1936)
- GSB – Graduate School of Business (since 1960)
- SoG – School of Government (since 1996)
- SMPH – School of Medicine and Public Health (since 2007)

Degrees and certificates
A.B. – Bachelor of Arts
B.F.A. – Bachelor of Fine Arts
B.S. – Bachelor of Science
A.A. – Associate in Arts
M.A. – Master of Arts
M.F.A. – Master of Fine Arts
Sc.D. – Doctor of Science
M.S. – Master of Science
M.D. – Doctor of Medicine
MBA – Master of Business Administration
MPM – Master of Public Management
D.P.A. – Doctor of Public Administration
PhD – Doctorate
Ed.D. – Doctor of Education
H.D. – Doctor of Humanities
LL.B. – Bachelor of Law
LL.D. – Doctor of Laws
M.L. – Master of Law
J.D. – Juris Doctor

== Art, design and literature ==
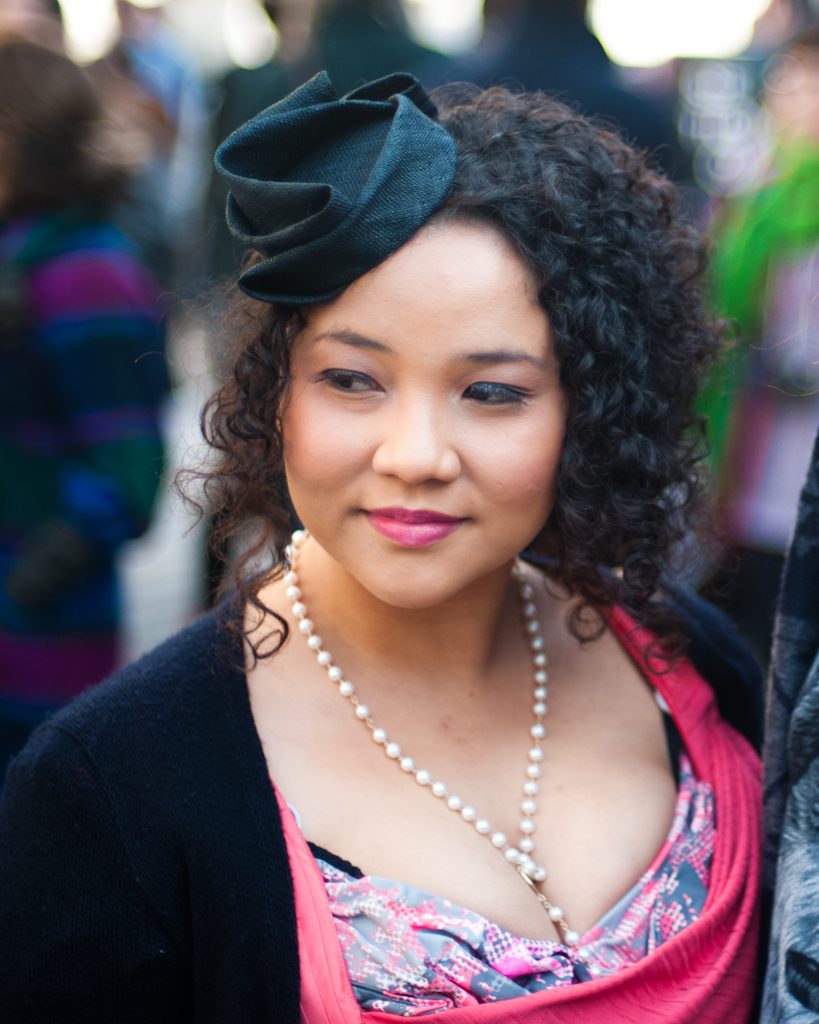
Mich Dulce

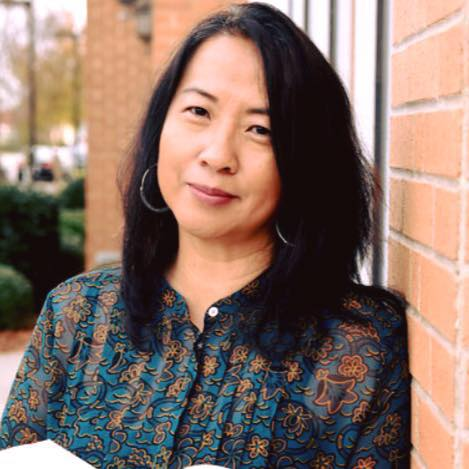
Luisa Igloria

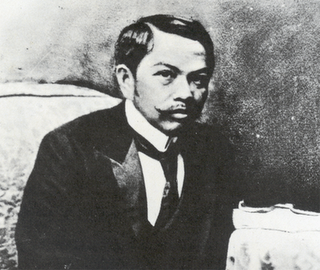
Juan Luna

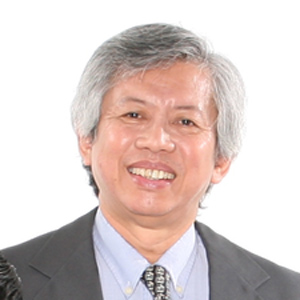
Pete Lacaba

Name	Class year	School(s)	Degree(s)	Notability	Ref.
Federico Aguilar Alcuaz	1955	Law	LL.B.	Painter, National Artist of the Philippines for Visual Arts (2009)	
Isidro Ancheta	1904	SAS	A.B.	Landscape painter	
Agnes Arellano	1971−72	SAS	M.A. Clinical Psychology	Sculptor, educator	
Lamberto V. Avellana	1937	SAS	A.B. magna cum laude	Director, National Artist of the Philippines for Film (1976)	
Salvador Bernal	1966	SAS	A.B. Philosophy cum laude	Stage designer, National Artist of the Philippines for Theater and Design (2003)	
Gregorio C. Brillantes	1953	SAS	A.B. Humanities	Palanca Award-winning writer	
Isagani R. Cruz	1970	SAS	M.A. English Literature	Palanca Award-winning writer	
Mich Dulce	2001	SOH	A.B. Interdisciplinary Studies	Internationally recognized fashion designer and milliner	
Paul Dumol		SAS	A.B. Communication summa cum laude (valedictorian)	Playwright, historian, educator	
Edmundo Farolan	1956, 1960, 1964	GS, HS, SAS	A.B.	Filipino Canadian author	
Doreen Fernandez	1977	SAS	Ph.D. in Literature	Cultural historian, food columnist, writer	
Candy Gourlay	1984	SAS	A.B. Communication	Journalist, author	
Fernando María Guerrero		MDM	A.B.	Lawyer, journalist, polyglot, writer during the Philippines' golden period of Spanish literature	
Luisa Igloria	1988	SAS	M.A. Literature	Palanca Award-winning writer, poet	
Karen Kunawicz	1990	SAS	B.S. Management	Writer, columnist, former television host and producer	
Emmanuel F. Lacaba	1970	SAS	A.B. Humanities	Writer, journalist and activist during the presidency of Ferdinand Marcos	
Pete Lacaba	1961–1964 (DNG)	SAS	A.B. English	FAMAS Award-winning screenwriter, journalist, poet	
Juan Luna	1874	SAS	A.B.	Painter during the Philippine Revolution (Spoliarium, The Death of Cleopatra)	
Danton Remoto	1983, 1989	SAS	A.B. Interdisciplinary Studies, M.A. English Literature	Palanca Award-winning essayist, writer, educator, chairman emeritus of Ladlad	
Alejandro Roces	1996 (L.H.D.)	GS, HS, SAS	L.H.D. honoris causa	Short story writer, essayist, former Philippine Secretary of Education (1962–1965), Chairman of the Movie and Television Review and Classification Board (2001–02), National Artist of the Philippines for Literature (2003)	
Ildefonso P. Santos Jr.	1948	HS	—N/a	Architect, National Artist of the Philippines for Architecture (2006)	
Danny Sillada	1993	GSB	MBA	Artist, writer, cultural critic	
Miguel Syjuco	2000	SOH	A.B. Literature (English)	Writer	
Fernando Zóbel de Ayala y Montojo	1963	SAS	L.H.D. honoris causa	Painter, museum collector, member of the Zóbel de Ayala family	
Lawrence Ypil	1999, 2010	SOSE, SOH	B.S. Biology, M.A. English	Palanca Award-winning poet and non-fiction writer, Fulbright Scholar, Lecturer at Yale-NUS College	
Roger Olivares	1959	SAS	A.B. Economics	Author, Fulbright Scholar	
Ryan Caidic	2007	SOSE	B.S. MIS	Internationally-recognized, Palanca Award-winning poet, advertising creative	

== Business ==
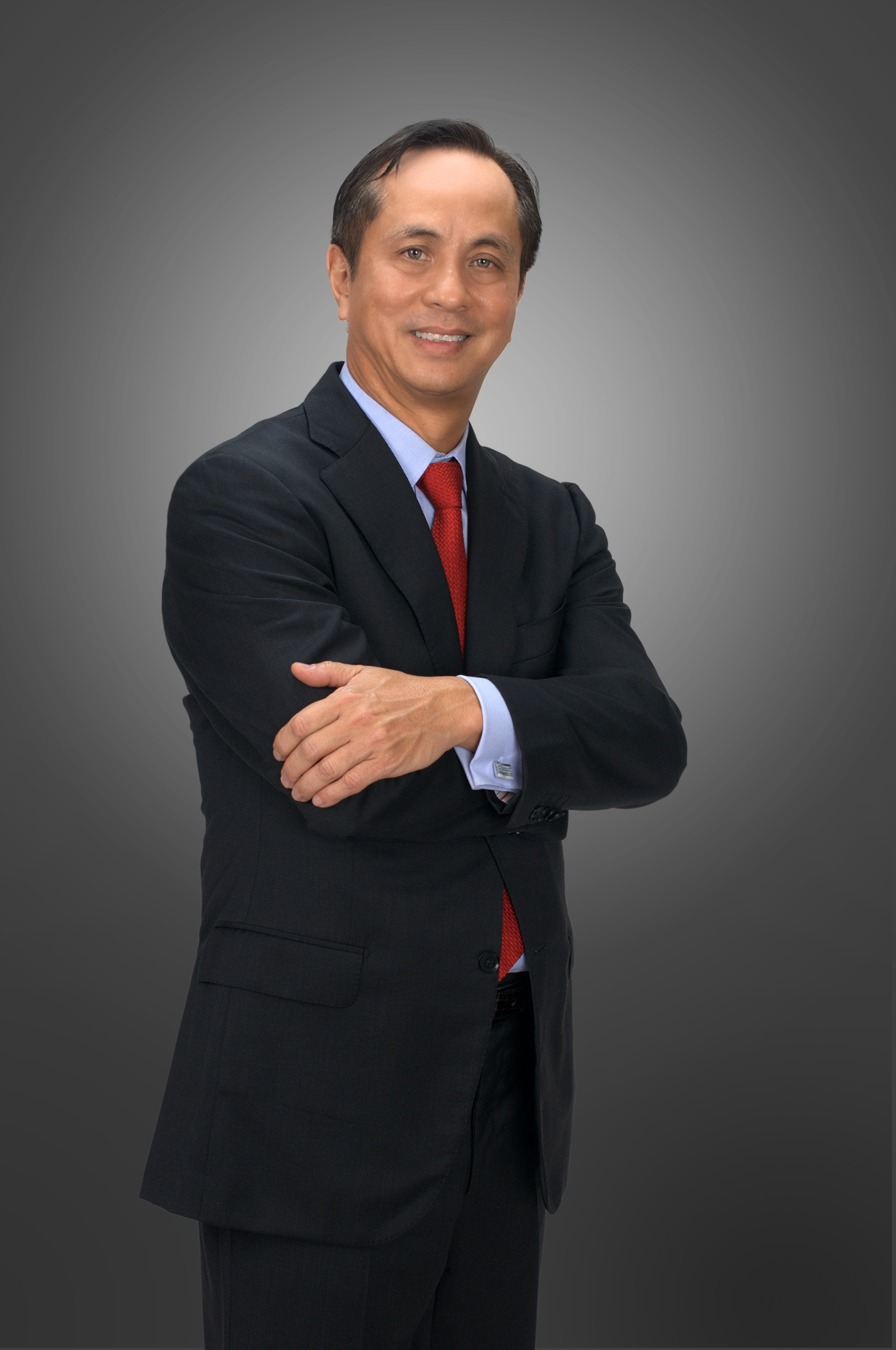
Eugenio Lopez III

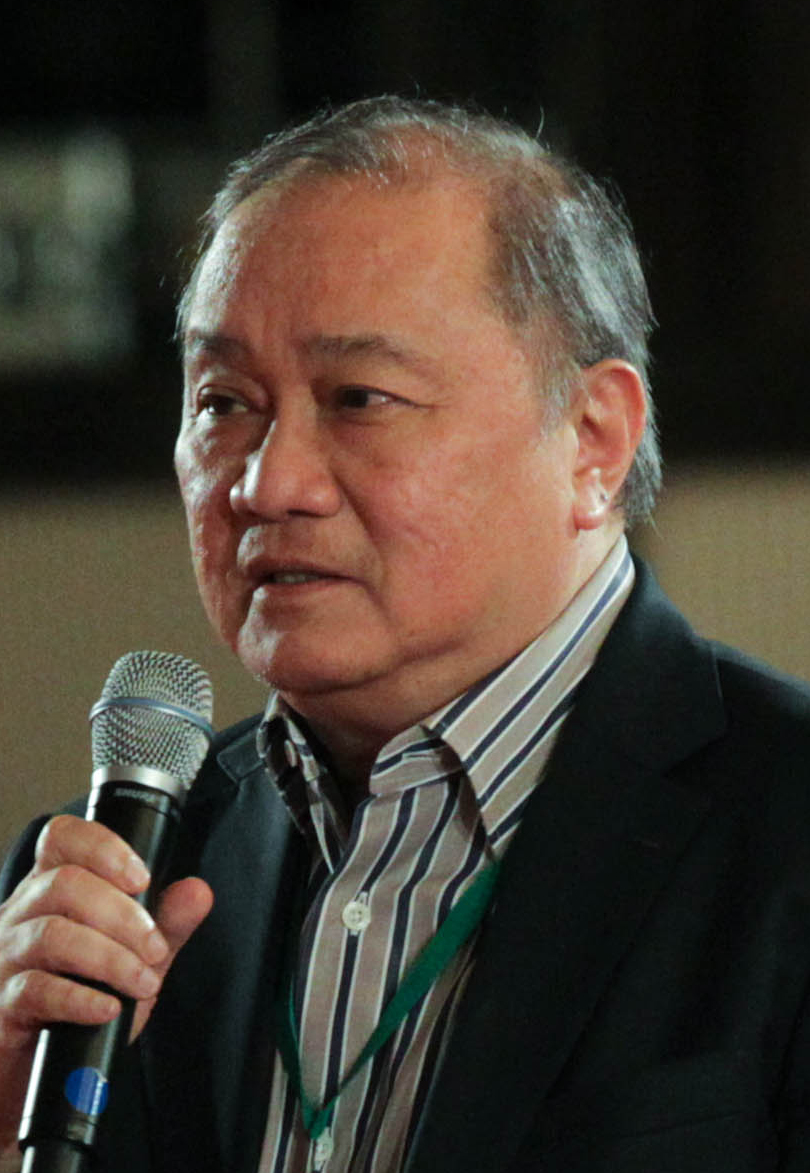
Manny Pangilinan

Name	Class year	School(s)	Degree(s)	Notability	Ref.
Benjamin M. Bitanga	1973	SAS	B.S. Management	Founder and CEO of MRC Allied	
Teodoro Borlongan	1970, 1974, 1978	GS, HS, SAS	A.B. Economics (Honors) cum laude	Former president of Urban Bank	
Eduardo de los Angeles	1962, 1966	SAS, Law	A.B., LL.B.	Dean of the Ateneo Law School (1984–1989), president of the Philippine Stock Exchange (1993–1996)	
John Gokongwei	2004	SAS	Doctor of Humanities honoris causa	Founder and chairman emeritus of JG Summit Holdings	
Annette Gozon-Valdes	1993	SAS	B.S. Management Engineering cum laude	Senior vice president of the GMA Network	
Carlo Katigbak	1991	SAS	B.S. Management Engineering	President and CEO of the ABS-CBN Corporation (2016–present)	
Eugenio Lopez Sr.	1919	SAS	A.B. cum laude	Co-founder of the Lopez Group of Companies	
Eugenio Lopez Jr.		SAS	A.B.	Former President/CEO and Chairman of the ABS-CBN Corporation (1956–1972, 1993–1997)	
Eugenio Lopez III	1966, 1970	GS, HS	—N/a	Chairman emeritus of the ABS-CBN Corporation	
Rizza Maniego-Eala	1991	SAS	A.B. Management Economics	Former CFO of Globe Telecom (2015–2024), retired swimmer (1985 SEA Games)	
Roberto Ongpin	1957	SAS	B.S. Business Administration cum laude	Chairman and CEO of Alphaland Corporation, former Philippine Minister of Industry under Ferdinand Marcos	
Manuel Pangilinan	1966	SAS	A.B. Economics cum laude	CEO of First Pacific (Metro Pacific Investments, PLDT), president and chairman of the Samahang Basketbol ng Pilipinas (2007–2016), former chairman of the Ateneo Board of Trustees	
Andrés Soriano	1908, 1912	GS, HS	—N/a	Spanish Filipino industrialist, founder of Philippine Airlines, former president of San Miguel Brewery Inc. (1939−1964)	
Cory Vidanes		SAS	A.B. Communication	COO of the ABS-CBN Corporation	

== Civil society ==
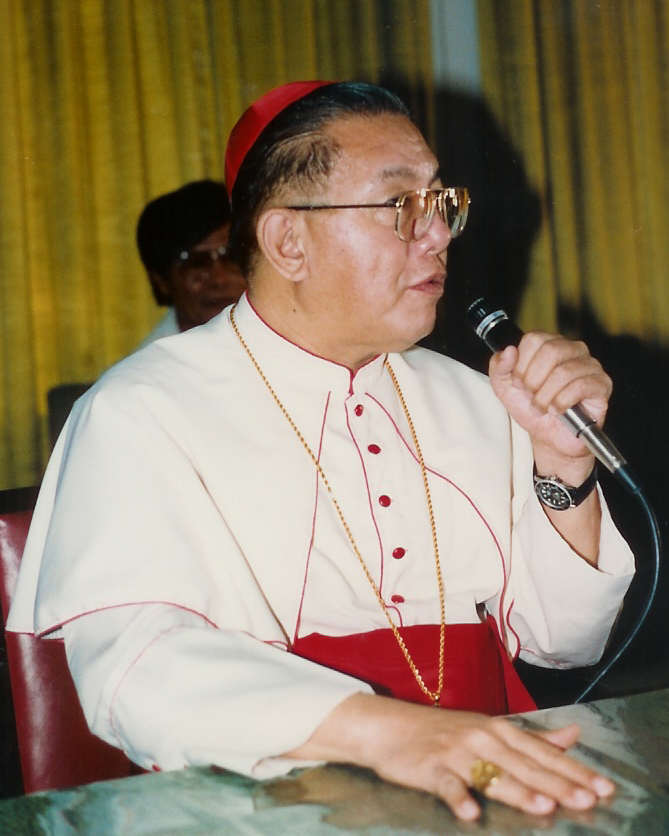
Cardinal Jaime Sin

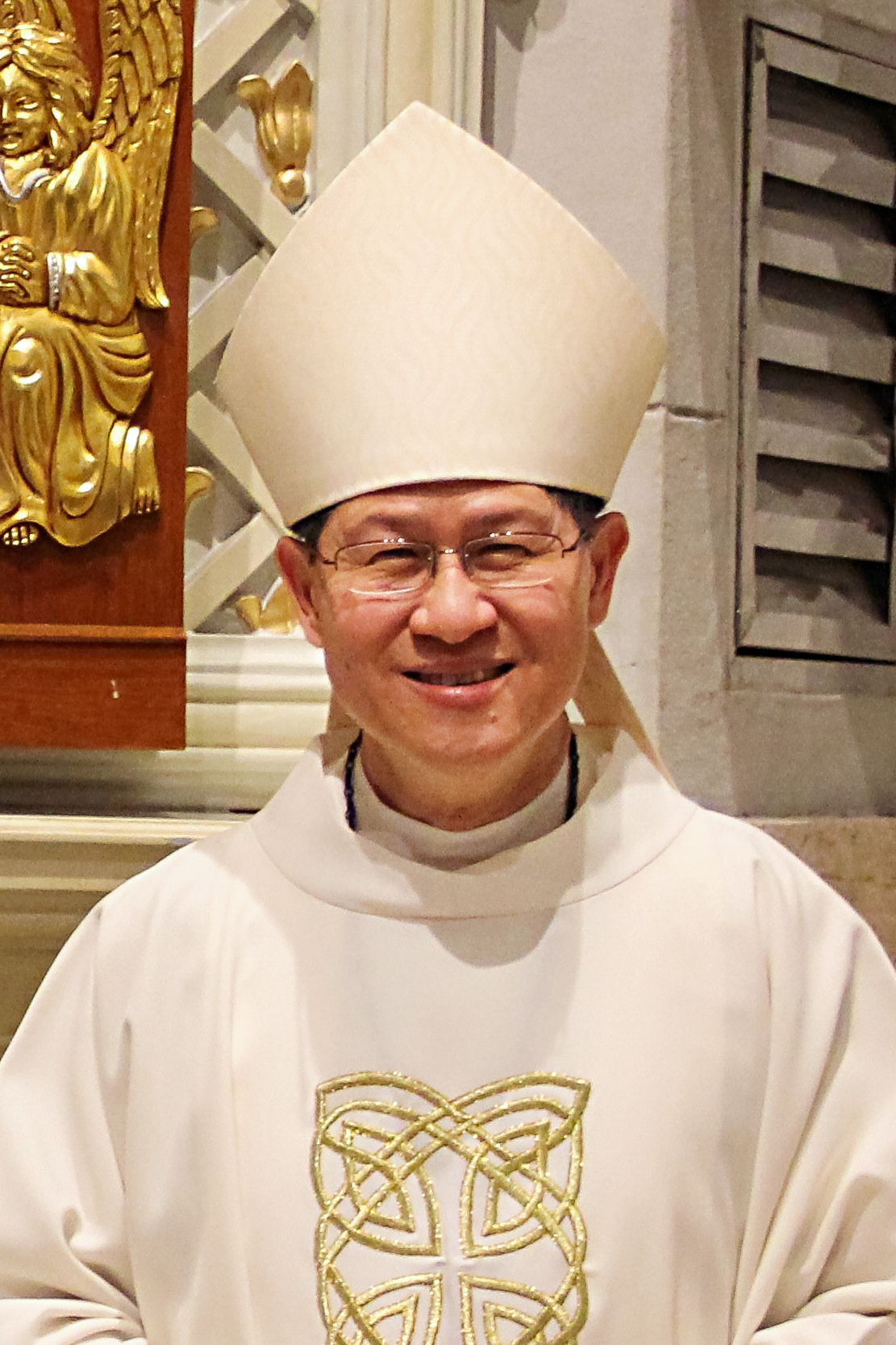
Cardinal Luis Antonio Tagle

Name	Class year	School(s)	Degree(s)	Notability	Ref.
Joaquin Bernas, S.J.	1962	Law	LL.B.	President of the Ateneo de Manila University (1984–1993), Dean Emeritus of Ateneo Law School (1972–1976, 2000–2004), faculty at the Ateneo Law School (since 1966)	
Hyacinth Gabriel Connon, F.S.C.	1961	SAS	Ph.D. honoris causa	President of the De La Salle University (1950–1959, 1966–1978)	
Emanuel de Guzman	2001	SOSS	M.A. Sociology	President of the Polytechnic University of the Philippines	
Horacio de la Costa, S.J.	1931, 1935	HS, SAS	A.B.	First Filipino Provincial Superior of the Society of Jesus in the Philippines	
Lydia B. Echauz		GSB	MBA	President of Far Eastern University (2002−2012)	
Tony Meloto	1971	SAS	A.B. Economics	Philanthropist, founder of Gawad Kalinga	
Alfredo Obviar	1914	SAS	A.B.	Venerable, Bishop Emeritus of Lucena	
Onofre R. Pagsanghan	1947, 1951, 1984, 1991	HS, SAS	A.B. Education, M.A. English Literature, L.H.D. honoris causa	Educator and writer	
Sonia Roco		SAS	M.A. Communication, M.A. Social Psychology	Educator, civic leader, wife of Raul Roco	
Mari-Jo P. Ruiz	1981	SAS	Ph.D. Mathematics	Mathematician, educator, member of the Ateneo Board of Trustees (2005–present)	
Karel San Juan, S.J.	1986	SAS	B.S. Mathematics cum laude (valedictorian)	Former President of the Ateneo de Zamboanga University (2013–2023), President of the Ateneo de Davao University (present)	
Rufino Santos	1960	SAS	L.H.D. honoris causa	Cardinal, 29th Archbishop of Manila (1953–1973)	
Jaime Sin	1980	SAS	D.H.L. honoris causa	Cardinal, 30th Archbishop of Manila (1974–2003)	
Luis Antonio Tagle	1977	SAS	A.B. Pre-Divinity	Cardinal, Dean of the College of Cardinals (2026-present), Pro-Prefect of the Dicastery for Evangelization (2022-present), former Prefect of the Congregation for the Evangelization of Peoples (2020-2022), 32nd Archbishop of Manila (2011-2019) and former Bishop of Imus (2001-2011)	
Jose Ramon Villarin, S.J.	1980	SAS	B.S. Physics magna cum laude (valedictorian)	President of the Ateneo de Manila University (2011–2020), physicist, 2007 Nobel Peace Prize recipient as member of the Intergovernmental Panel on Climate Change	

== Entertainment ==
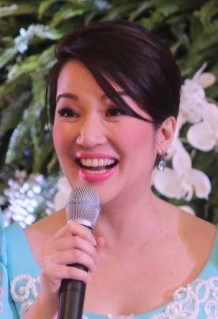
Kris Aquino

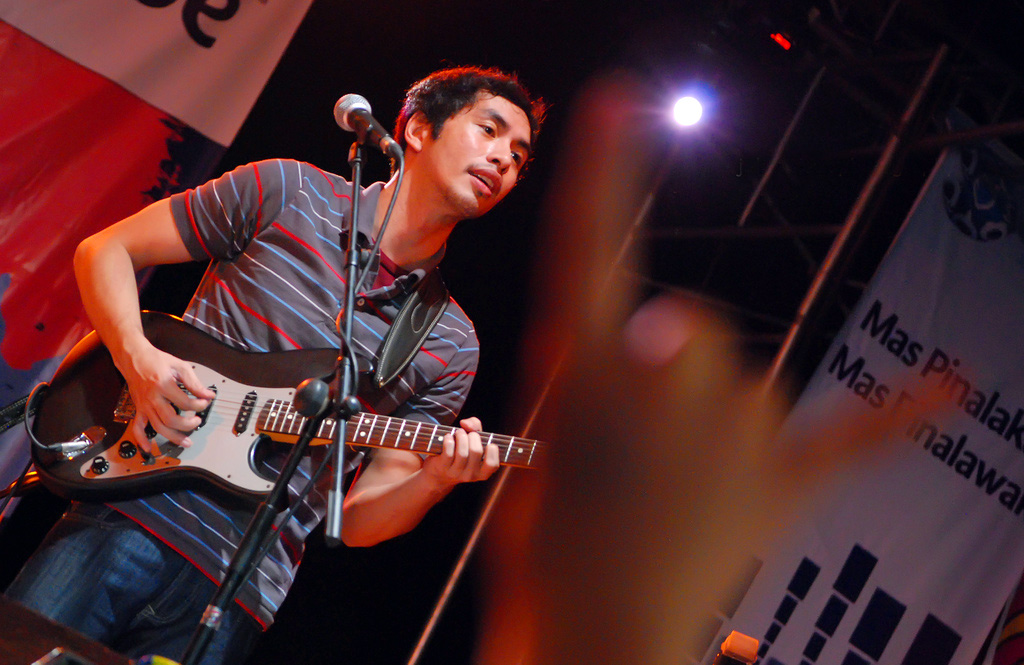
Rico Blanco

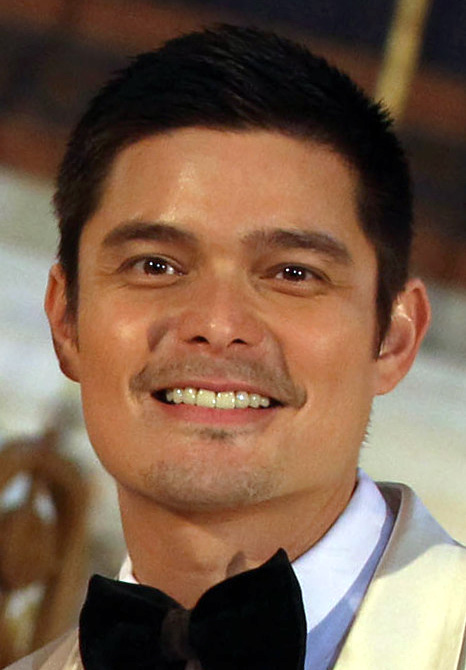
Dingdong Dantes

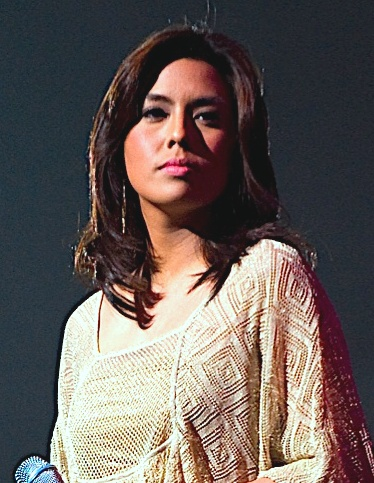
Nikki Gil

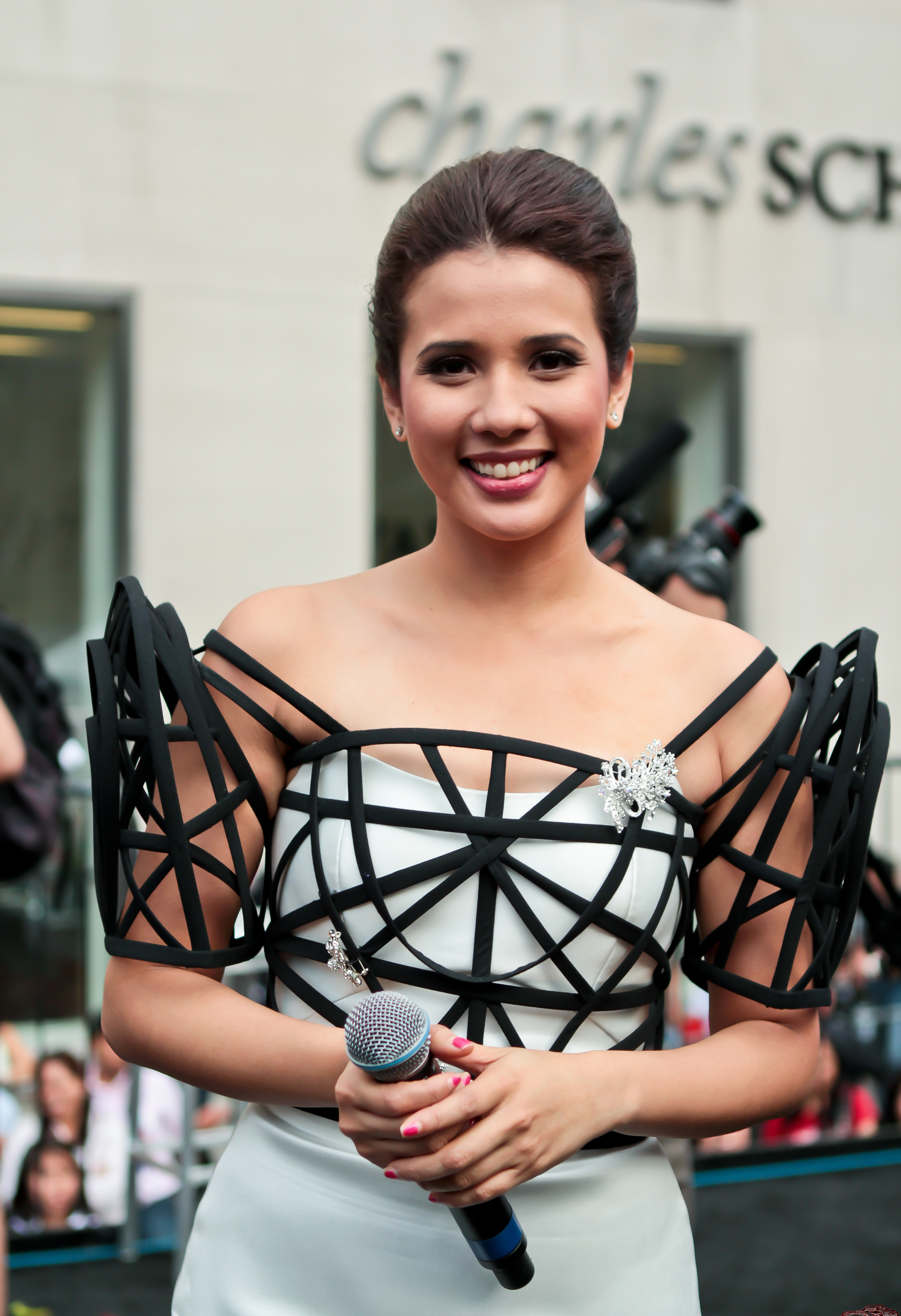
Karylle

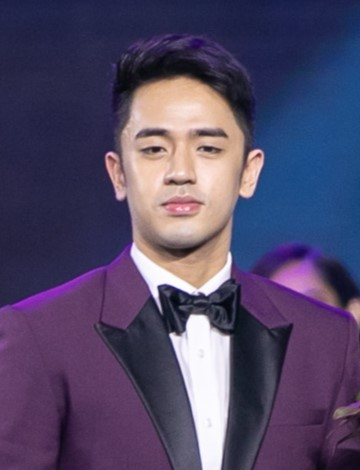
David Licauco

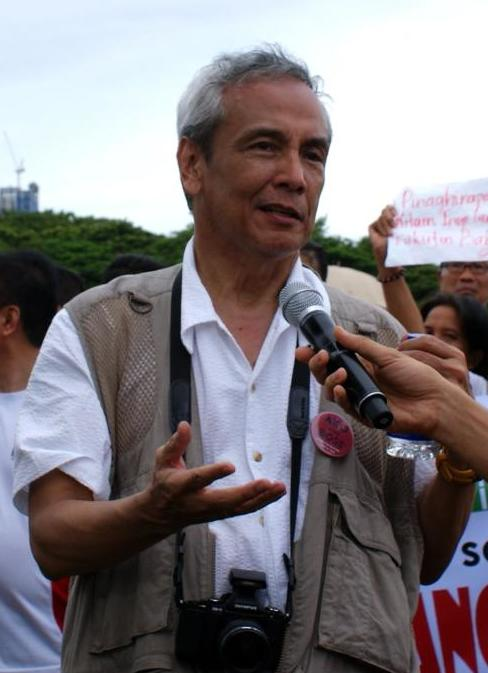
Jim Paredes

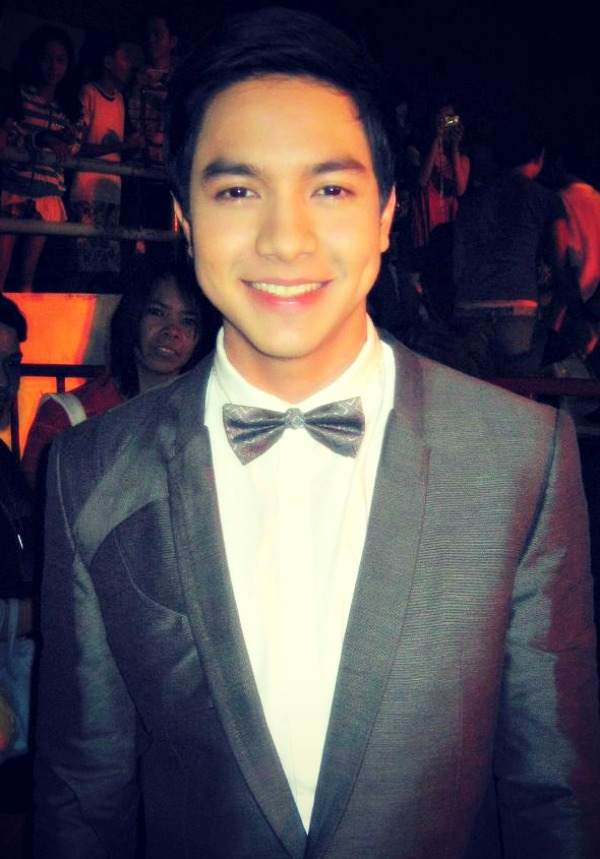
Alden Richards

Name	Class year	School(s)	Degree(s)	Notability	Ref.
Boy Abunda	DNG	SAS	B.S. Management	Talk show host, publicist, talent manager, endorser	
Tetchie Agbayani	2001–02	SOSS	M.A. Counseling Psychology	Actress, former beauty queen (Mutya ng Pilipinas)	
Kris Aquino	1992	SAS	A.B. Literature	Actress, television host	
Joey Ayala	1969, 1973	GS, HS	—N/a	Singer-songwriter, former chairman of the National Commission for Culture and the Arts	
Rico Blanco	1992	SAS	A.B. Management Economics	Musician (Rivermaya)	
Jimmy Bondoc	1997 (SAS)	GS, HS, SAS	A.B. Communication	Musician	
Kris Bernal	2008	SOS	A.B. Psychology	Actress	
Chris Cantada	2002, 2006	HS, SOH	A.B. Interdisciplinary Studies	Musician (Sponge Cola)	
Jose Mari Chan	1967	SAS	A.B. Economics	Singer-songwriter	
Gab Chee Kee		GS, HS	—N/a	Musician (Parokya Ni Edgar)	
Crisel Consunji	2006, 2009	SOSS	A.B. Political Science, M.A. Global Politics	Hong Kong-based actress	
Jasmine Curtis-Smith	2013–2016 (DNG)	SOSS	A.B. Communication	Actress	
Mikael Daez	2010 (SOM)	GS, HS, SOM	B.S. Management	Actor, model, television host	
Dingdong Dantes	1998 (HS)	GS, HS,	—N/a	Actor, dancer, television host, director, film producer, former commissioner of the National Youth Commission (2014–2016)	
Janice de Belen	2002 (DNG)	SOSS	A.B. Psychology	Actress	
Gosh Dilay	2002	HS		Musician (Sponge Cola)	
Robi Domingo	2012	SOSE	B.S. Health Sciences	Television host, actor	
Ina Feleo	2006	SOH	B.F.A. Creative Writing	Actress, dancer	
Franchesca Floirendo	2014	SOH	B.F.A.	Actress, model	
Nikki Gil	2009	SOH	A.B. Literature (English)	Actress, singer, television host	
Bianca Gonzalez	2004	SOSS	A.B. Communication	Television host, model	
Alodia Gosiengfiao	2009	SOH	B.F.A. Information Design	Cosplayer, television personality	
Laurice Guillen	1971	SAS	M.A. Communication	Actress, director	
Janine Gutierrez	2011	SOSS	A.B. European Studies	Actress, television host, model	
Marie Jamora	2001	SOSS	A.B. Communication cum laude	Music video and commercial director, editor	
Karylle	2002	SOM	B.S. Communications Technology Management	Actress, singer	
Reese Lansangan	2011	SOH	B.F.A. Information Design	Singer-songwriter, artist	
Grace Lee	2006	SOH	A.B. Interdisciplinary Studies (Communication and Chinese Studies)	Television and radio host	
Mikee Lee	2004, 2008, 2012	GS, HS, SOM	B.S. Management Engineering	Pinoy Big Brother: Teen Edition contestant	
Laura Lehmann	2017	SOSS	A.B. Psychology	Television host, model, former Ateneo Blue Eagles courtside reporter (2014–2016), beauty queen (Miss World 2017)	
David Licauco	2012 (HS)	GS, HS,	—N/a	Actor, model (GMA Network)	
Maxene Magalona	2008	SOSS	A.B. Social Sciences	Actress	
Kelsey Merritt	2017	SOSS	A.B. Communication	Model, first Filipino to walk in the Victoria's Secret Fashion Show	
Chito Miranda		GS, HS	—N/a	Singer-songwriter, lead vocalist of Parokya ni Edgar	
Vinci Montaner		GS, HS	—N/a	Musician (Parokya ni Edgar)	
Dindin Moreno		HS		Musician (Parokya ni Edgar)	
Jan Nieto	2003	SOM	B.S. Management Engineering	Singer, Philippine Idol contestant	
Gab Pangilinan	2013	SOSS	A.B. Communication	Actress and singer	
Jim Paredes	1969	HS		Musician (APO Hiking Society), activist, lecturer	
Rica Peralejo	2012	SOH	A.B. Literature (English)	Actress, television host	
Krista Ranillo	2007	SOH	A.B. Interdisciplinary Studies	Actress	
Maricar Reyes	2002	SOSE	B.S. Biology	Actress	
Alden Richards	2010 (HS)	GS, HS,	—N/a	Actor, model	
Gerard Salonga	1994	SAS	A.B.	Orchestral conductor (ABS-CBN Philharmonic Orchestra), musical arranger	
Lea Salonga	1989 (DNG)	SAS	B.S. Biology	Tony Award-winning actress, singer	
Antoinette Taus	2001	SOSS	A.B. Political Science	Actress, singer, philanthropist	
Nicole Uysiuseng	2012	SOM	A.B. Interdisciplinary Studies	Actress and television host	
Charee Pineda	2007	SOSS	A.B. Sociology	Actress	
Kylie Verzosa	2014	SOM	B.S. Management	Beauty queen (Miss International 2016), actress, model	
Georgina Wilson	DNG (transferred)	SOSS	A.B. Economics (Honors)	Model, television host, endorser, co-founder and marketing director of Sunnies Studios	
Yael Yuzon	1998, 2002, 2006	GS, HS, SOH	A.B. Literature (English)	Singer-songwriter, lead vocalist and guitarist of Sponge Cola	
Yanni Yuzon	1992, 1996, 2000	GS, HS, SOSS	A.B. Social Sciences	Musician (Pupil)	

== Government and politics ==
=== Presidents of the Philippines ===
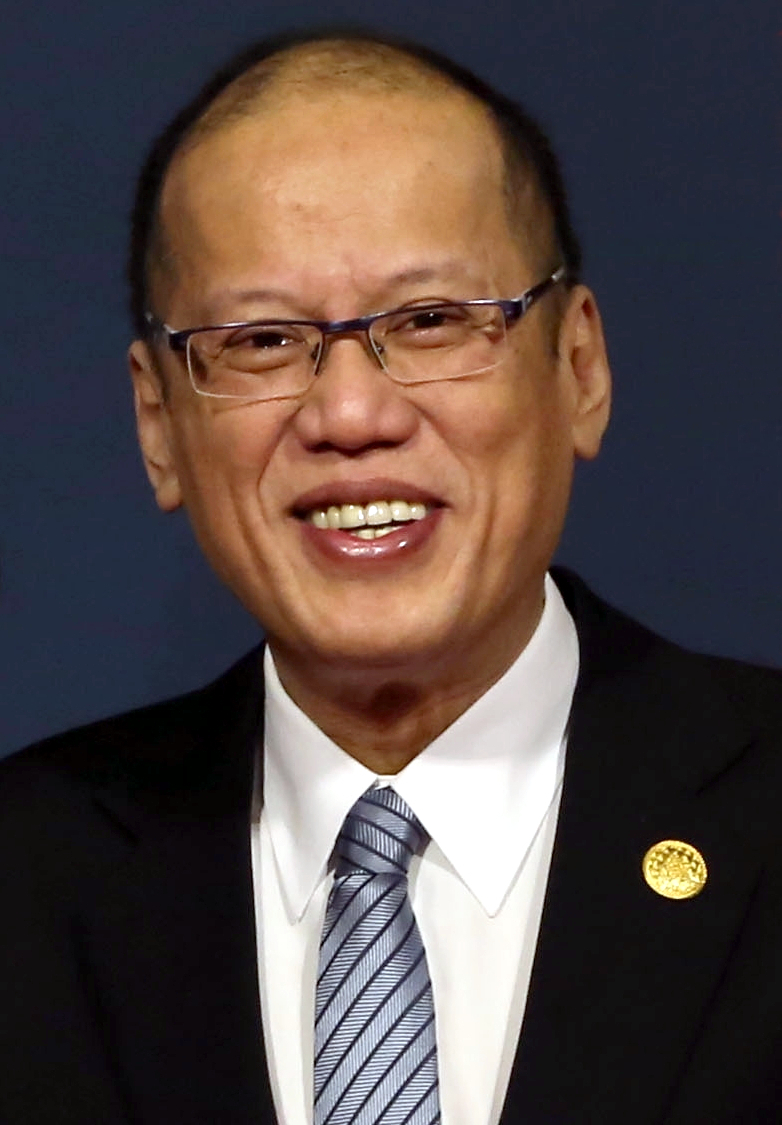
Benigno Aquino III

Name	Class year	School(s)	Degree(s)	Notability	Ref.
Benigno Aquino III	1973, 1977, 1981	GS, HS, SAS	A.B. Economics	15th President of the Philippines (2010–2016), Philippine Senator (2007–2010); Member of the Philippine House of Representatives, Tarlac's 2nd District (1998–2007)	
Corazon Aquino	1986	SAS	L.H.D. honoris causa	11th President of the Philippines (1986–1992)	
Joseph Estrada	1951, 1952–53; DNG (expelled)	GS, HS	—N/a	13th President of the Philippines (1998–2001), 9th Vice President of the Philippines (1992–1998), Mayor of Manila (2013–2019), Mayor of San Juan (1969–1986), Philippine Senator (1987–1992), former actor	
Gloria Macapagal Arroyo	1978	SAS	M.A. Economics	14th President of the Philippines (2001–2010), 10th Vice President of the Philippines (1998–2001), Speaker of the Philippine House of Representatives (2018–19); Member of the Philippine House of Representatives, Pampanga's 2nd District (2010–2019, 2022–present)	
Fidel Ramos	1981, 1997	GSB	MBA, LL.D. honoris causa	12th President of the Philippines (1992–1998), Secretary of National Defense (1988–1991), Chief of Staff of the Armed Forces of the Philippines (1984–85, 1986–88), Chief of the Philippine Constabulary (1972–1986)	

=== Vice Presidents, Cabinet members and other executive officials ===
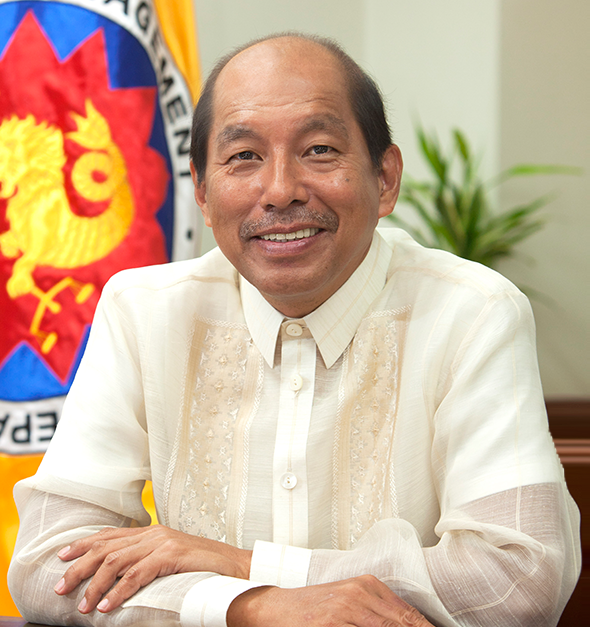
Florencio Abad

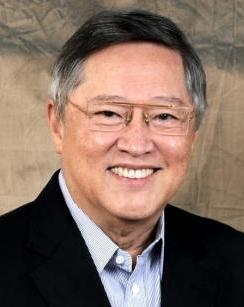
Carlos Dominguez III

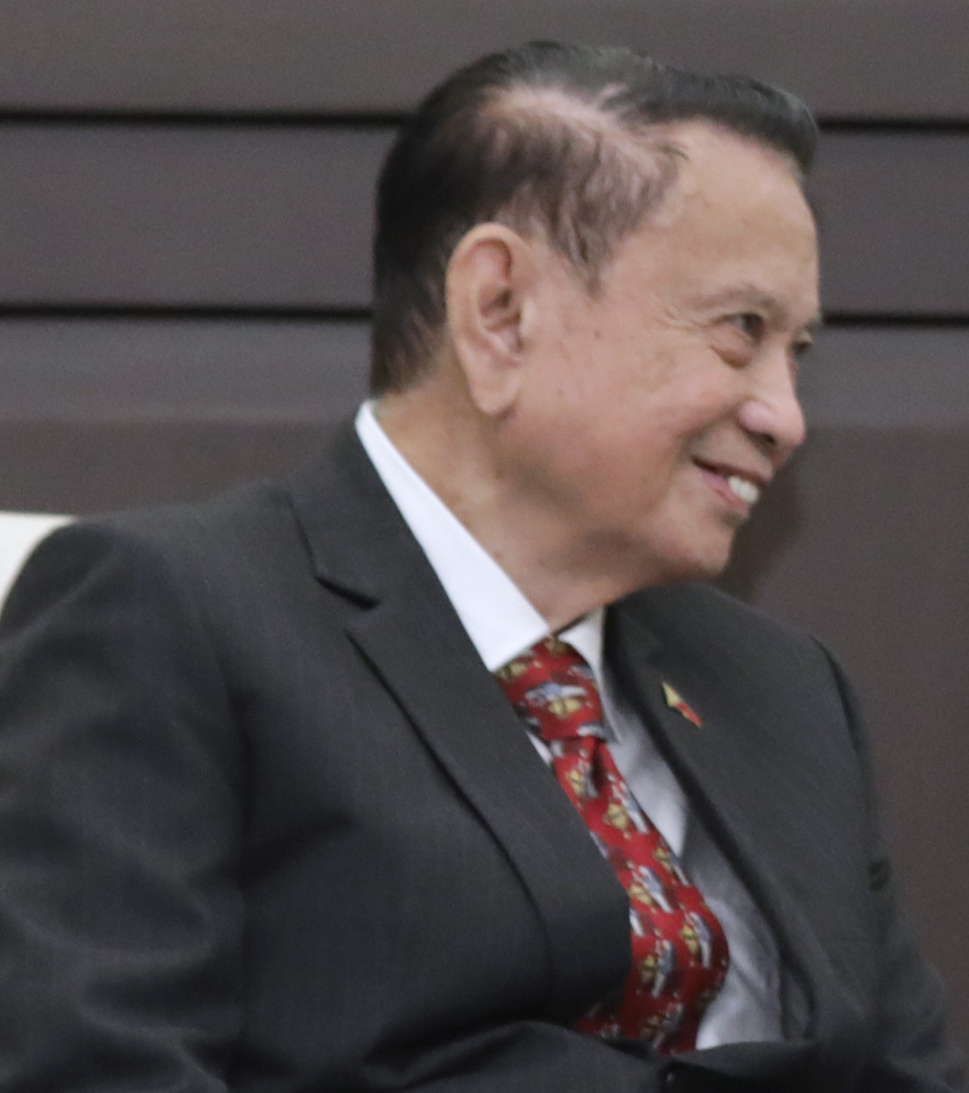
Teofisto Guingona Jr.

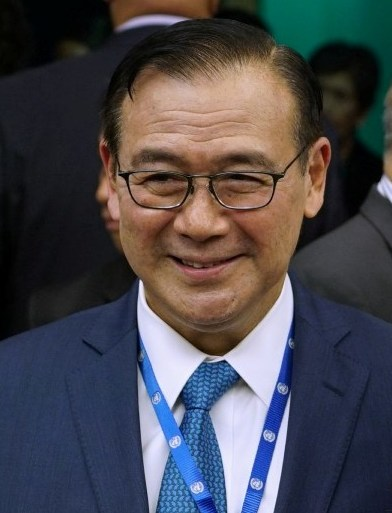
Teodoro Locsin Jr.

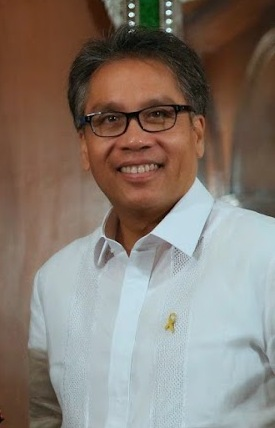
Mar Roxas

Name	Class year	School(s)	Degree(s)	Notability	Ref.
Florencio Abad	1972, 1980, 1985	HS, SAS, Law	B.S. Business Management, LL.B.	Philippine Secretary of Budget and Management (2010–2016), Secretary of Education (2004–05); Member of the Philippine House of Representatives, Batanes (1987–1989, 1995–2004)	
Joseph Emilio Abaya	2005	Law	J.D.	Philippine Secretary of Transportation and Communications (2012–2016); Member of the Philippine House of Representatives, Cavite's 2nd District (2004–2012); great-grandson of Emilio Aguinaldo	
Ignacio Bunye	1964, 1969	SAS, Law	A.B. Political Science, LL.B.	Monetary Board Member of the Bangko Sentral ng Pilipinas (2008–2014), Philippine Press Secretary (2002–03), Chairman of the Metropolitan Manila Development Authority (1991–92), Mayor of Muntinlupa (1986–87, 1988–1995, 1995–1998); Member of the Philippine House of Representatives, Muntinlupa (1998–2001)	
Jose Calida	1973	Law	LL.B. (Dean's Lister)	Solicitor General of the Philippines (2016–2022), Commission on Audit Chairperson (2022-present)	
Roy Cimatu		GSB	MBA	Philippine Secretary of Environment and Natural Resources (2017–2022), Chief of Staff of the Armed Forces of the Philippines under Gloria Macapagal Arroyo (2002), retired Philippine Army general	
Gamaliel Asis Cordoba	1988, 1992, 1996	HS, SAS, Law	AB Economics, Juris Doctor	Philippine Chairman of the Commission on Audit (2022-present) Commissioner of the National Telecommunications Commission (2009-2022) Board Director of the Philippine Amusement and Gaming Corporation (2008-2009) Appointments Secretary of the Office of the President (2006-2007)	
Eduardo del Rosario	1994	GSB	MBA	Philippine Secretary of Human Settlements and Urban Development (2020–present), Chairman of the Housing and Urban Development Coordinating Council (2017–2019), retired Philippine Army major general	
Carlos Dominguez III	1965, 1969	SAS, GSB	A.B. Economics, MBA	Philippine Secretary of Finance (2016–2022), former Secretary of Agriculture (1987–1989)	
Ace Durano	1997	Law	LL.B.	Philippine Secretary of Tourism (2005–2010); Member of the Philippine House of Representatives, Cebu's 5th District (1998–2004, 2013–2016)	
Teofisto Guingona Jr.	1948, 1950, 1953	SAS, Law	A.A., A.B. LL.B.	11th Vice President of the Philippines (2001–2004), Secretary of Justice (1995–1998), Executive Secretary (1993–1995), Senator (1987–1993, 1998–2001), President pro tempore of the Philippine Senate (1987–1990, 1993)	
Anwar Ibrahim	1996		D.H.L.	7th Deputy Prime Minister of Malaysia	
Edwin Lacierda	1989	Law	LL.B.	Philippine Presidential Spokesperson for Benigno Aquino III	
Salvador Laurel	1941	GS		8th Vice President of the Philippines (1986–1992), Prime Minister of the Philippines (1986), Senator (1967–1972); Member of the Interim Batasang Pambansa, Region IV-A (1978–1983); Secretary-General of the United Nationalist Democratic Organization	
Teodoro Locsin Jr.	1977	Law	LL.B.	Philippine Ambassador to the United Kingdom and Ireland (2022–present); Philippine Secretary of Foreign Affairs (2018–2022); former Permanent Representative of the Philippines to the United Nations (2017–18); Member of the Philippine House of Representatives, Makati's 1st District (2001–2010); journalist, presidential speechwriter for Corazon Aquino	
Raul Manglapus	1935, 1965	SAS, Law	A.B. summa cum laude, LL.B. honoris causa	Philippine Secretary of Foreign Affairs (1987–1992), Senator (1961–1967, 1987), co-founder of the Progressive Party of the Philippines	
Karlo Nograles	1997, 2003	SOM, Law	B.S. Management Engineering, J.D.	Cabinet Secretary of the Philippines (2018–present); Member of the Philippine House of Representatives, Davao City's 1st District (2010–2018)	
Paquito Ochoa Jr.		Law	LL.B.	Executive Secretary of the Philippines (2010–2016)	
Jaime Ongpin	1958	SAS	B.S. Business Administration	Former Philippine Minister of Finance under Corazon Aquino (1986–87), former president of the Benguet Corporation	
Ricardo C. Puno	1947	SAS	A.B. summa cum laude	Philippine Minister of Justice under Ferdinand Marcos (1979–1984)	
Ronaldo Puno	1968	SAS	A.B. Political Science	Secretary of the Interior and Local Government (1999–2000, 2006–2010); Member of the Philippine House of Representatives, Antipolo's 1st District (2004–2006)	
Leni Robredo	2022	SOSS	Ph.D. in economics (honoris causa)	14th Vice President of the Philippines (2016-2022); Member of the House of Representatives, Camarines Sur's 3rd District (2013-2016); Chairperson of Angat Buhay	
Alberto Romualdez	1952, 1956, 1960	GS, HS, SAS	A.B. Biological Sciences	Doctor, Philippine Secretary of Health (1998–2001)	
Mar Roxas	1970, 1974	GS, HS	—N/a	Philippine Secretary of the Interior and Local Government (2012–2015), Secretary of Transportation and Communications (2011–12), Senator (2004–2010), Secretary of Trade and Industry (2000–2003); Member of the House of Representatives, Capiz's 1st District (1993–2000)	
Roberto Sebastian	1956, 1960, 1964	GS, HS, SAS	A.B. Economics	Philippine Secretary of Agriculture (1992–1996)	
Domingo Siazon Jr.	1951, 1955, 1959	GS, HS, SAS	A.B. Political Science	Diplomat; Philippine Secretary of Foreign Affairs (1995–2001), Director-General of the United Nations Industrial Development Organization (1985–1992), Philippine Ambassador to Japan (1993–1995, 2001–2010)	
Benjamin Abalos Jr.	1987	Law	LL.B.	Secretary of the Department of the Interior and Local Government(2022–present);MMDA Chairman (2020–2022); Mayor of Mandaluyong (1998–2004, 2007–2016); Member of the Philippine House of Representatives, Mandaluyong (2004–2007)	
Rafael Rivas Alunan Sr.	1902, 1910	GSB, Law	MBA, LL.B	Secretary of the Interior and Local Government (1938-1941) Secretary of Agriculture and Commerce (1928-1933) (1941) (1942-1945) Secretary of Finance (1933) House of Representatives, Negros Occidental's 2nd District	

=== Governors (Bangko Sentral ng Pilipinas) ===
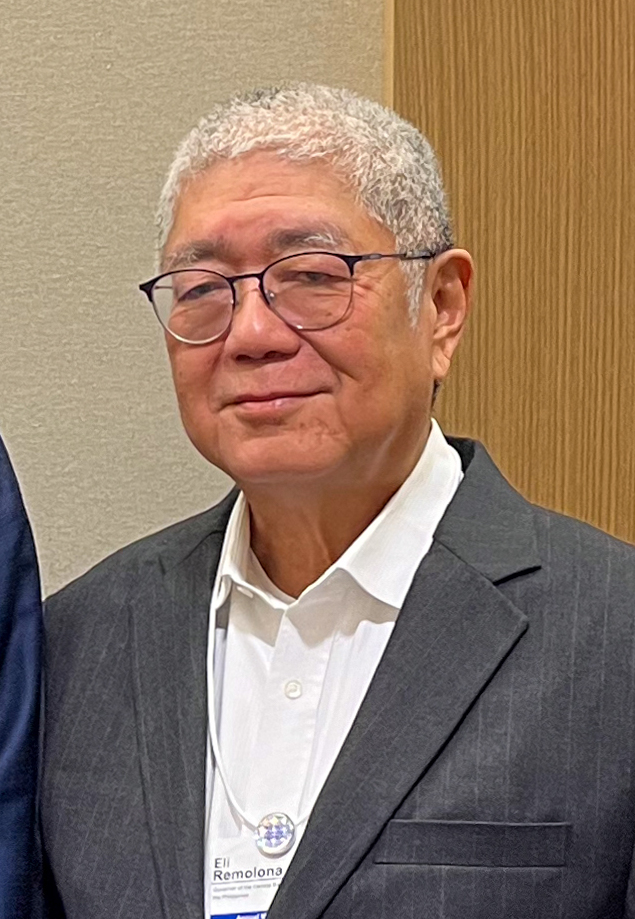
Eli Remolona

Name	Class year	School(s)	Degree(s)	Notability	Ref.
Rafael Buenaventura	1951, 1955	GS, HS	—N/a	Governor of the Bangko Sentral ng Pilipinas (1999–2005)	
Eli M. Remolona, Jr.	1972	SAS	A.B. Economics-Honors 1972	Governor of the Bangko Sentral ng Pilipinas (2023–present)	
Gabriel Singson	1948, 1952, 2015	SAS, Law	A.B., LL.B., D.P.A. honoris causa	Governor of the Bangko Sentral ng Pilipinas (1993–1999)	
Amando Tetangco Jr.	1973	SAS	A.B. Economics cum laude	Governor of the Bangko Sentral ng Pilipinas (2005–2017)	

=== Governors (Provincial) ===
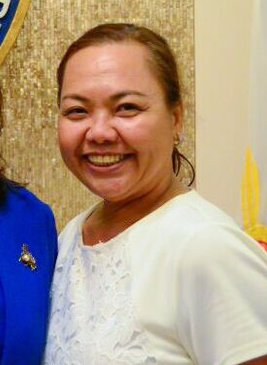
Kaka Bag-ao

Name	Class year	School(s)	Degree(s)	Notability	Ref.
Kaka Bag-ao	1993	Law	J.D.	Governor of the Dinagat Islands (2019–present); Member of the Philippine House of Representatives, Dinagat Islands (2013–2019)	
Jose Briones	1931, 1935, 1940	HS, SAS, Law	A.B., LL.B.	Governor of Cebu (1956–1961); Member of the Philippine House of Representatives, Cebu's 2nd District (1961–1969)	
Evelio Javier	1959, 1963, 1968	HS, SAS, Law	A.B. History and Government, LL.B.	Governor of Antique (1971–1980)	
Exequiel Javier		Law	LL.B.	Governor of Antique (1998–2001, 2010–2015); Member of the Philippine House of Representatives, Antique (1987–1998, 2001–2010)	
Matthew Manotoc	2005–06 (transferred)	LS		Governor of Ilocos Norte (2019–present), grandson of Ferdinand Marcos	
Arthur C. Yap	1987, 1991	SAS, Law	A.B. Management Economics (Dean's Lister), J.D.	Governor of Bohol (2019–present); Member of the Philippine House of Representatives, Bohol's 3rd District (2010–2019); Philippine Secretary of Agriculture (2004–05, 2006–2010)	

=== Military ===
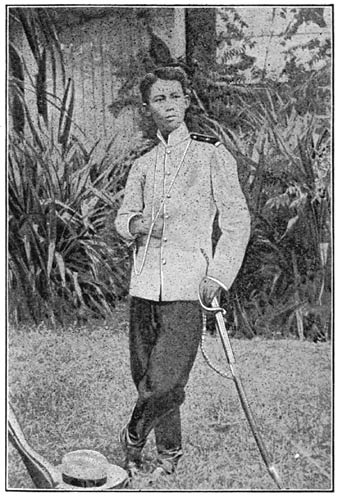
Gregorio del Pilar

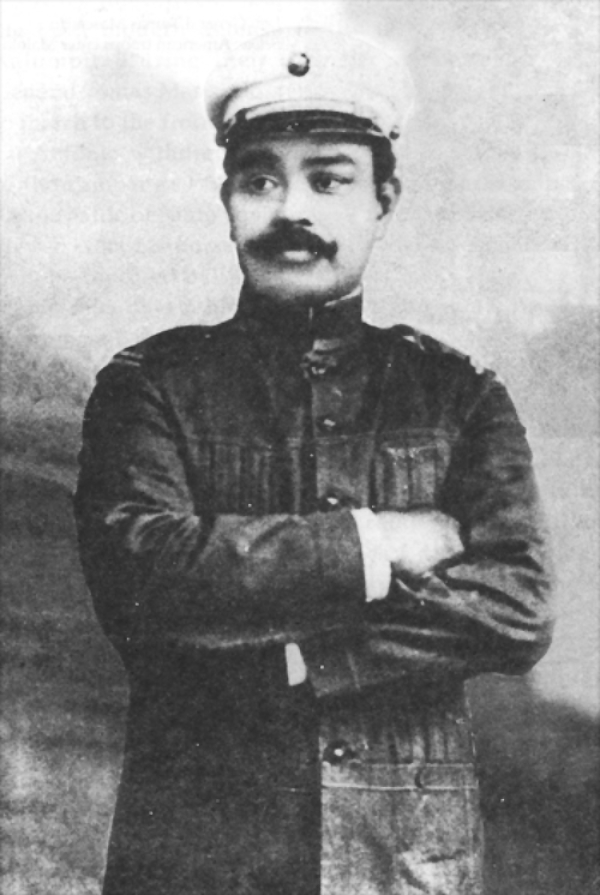
Antonio Luna

Name	Class year	School(s)	Degree(s)	Notability	Ref.
Juan Araneta		MDM	perito mercantil	Revolutionary leader during the Negros Revolution, member of the Araneta family	
Gregorio del Pilar	1896	SAS	A.B.	General of the Philippine Revolutionary Army during the Philippine–American War	
Antonio Luna	1881	MDM	A.B.	Commanding General of the Philippine Army during the Philippine–American War	

=== Judges ===
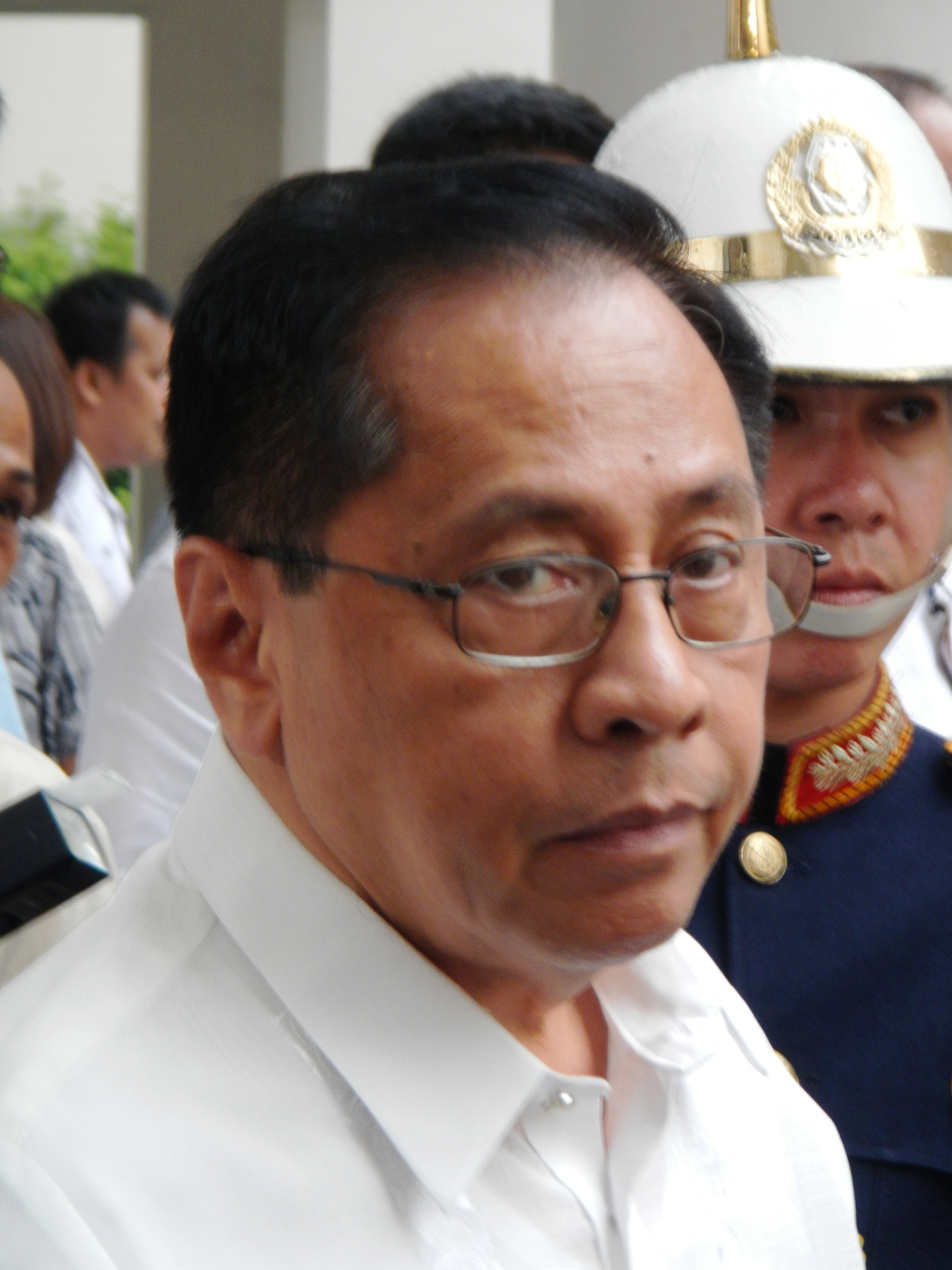
Roberto A. Abad

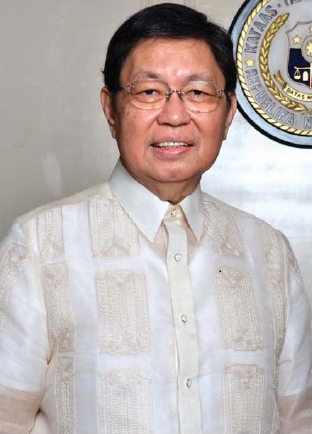
Arturo Brion

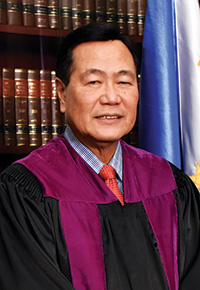
Antonio Carpio

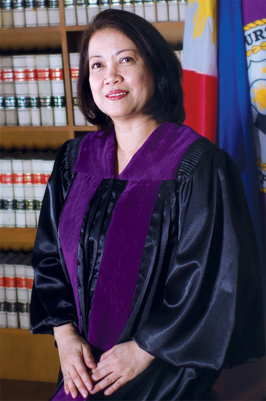
Maria Lourdes Sereno

Name	Class year	School(s)	Degree(s)	Notability	Ref.
Roberto A. Abad	1968	Law	LL.B. (Dean's List)	Retired Associate Justice of the Philippine Supreme Court (2009–2014)	
Adolfo Azcuna	1959, 1962	SAS, Law	A.B., LL.B. cum laude	Associate Justice of the Philippine Supreme Court (2002–2009), Chancellor of the Philippine Judicial Academy (2009–present)	
César Bengzon	1915 (SAS), 1964 (Law)	HS, SAS, Law	A.B. magna cum laude, LL.D. honoris causa	9th Chief Justice of the Philippine Supreme Court (1961–1966), first Filipino judge appointed to the International Court of Justice	
Arturo Brion	1974	Law	LL.B. cum laude (valedictorian)	Associate Justice of the Philippine Supreme Court (2008–2016), Philippine Secretary of Labor and Employment (2006–2008), professor at the Ateneo Law School	
Alfredo Benjamin Caguioa	1981, 1985	SAS, Law	A.B. Economics, LL.B.	Associate Justice of the Philippine Supreme Court (2016–present), Chief Presidential Legal Counsel of Benigno Aquino III (2013–2015)	
Antonio Carpio	1970	SAS	A.B. Economics	Retired Associate Justice of the Philippine Supreme Court (2001–2019)	
Mariano del Castillo	1976	Law	LL.B.	Retired Associate Justice of the Philippine Supreme Court (2009–2019)	
Florentino Floro	1974, 1982	SAS, Law	A.B. Philosophy and Theology (Pre-Divinity), LL.B.	Former judge dismissed by the Philippine Supreme Court for mental illness in 2006	
Estela Perlas-Bernabe	1976	Law	LL.B. (Salutatorian)	Retired Associate Justice of the Philippine Supreme Court (2011–2022), Associate Justice of the Philippine Court of Appeals (2004–2011)	
Regalado Maambong	1961	Law	LL.B.	Jurist, Associate Justice of the Philippine Court of Appeals (2002–2009), member of the 1986 Constitutional Commission	
Midas Marquez	1987, 1993	SAS, Law	A.B. Economics, J.D.	Associate Justice of the Philippine Supreme Court (2022-present), former Supreme Court spokesperson and Court Administrator	
Beverley McLachlin	2006	Law	LL.D. honoris causa	17th Chief Justice of Canada (2000–2017)	
J. B. L. Reyes	1918, 1971	SAS	A.B. cum laude, H.D. honoris causa	Associate Justice of the Philippine Supreme Court (1954–1972)	
Voltaire Y. Rosales	1981	Law	LL.B.	Executive Regional Trial Court Judge in Tanauan, Batangas (1995–2004)	
Maria Lourdes Sereno	1980	SAS	A.B. Economics	De facto Chief Justice of the Philippine Supreme Court (2012–2018), Associate Justice of the Philippine Supreme Court (2010–2012)	
Claudio Teehankee	1934, 1938, 1940, 1985	HS, SAS, Law	A.B. summa cum laude, LL.B. summa cum laude, L.H.D. honoris causa	16th Chief Justice of the Philippine Supreme Court (1987–88), Associate Justice of the Philippine Supreme Court during the Ferdinand Marcos presidency (1969–1987), Secretary of Justice (1967–1969)	
José Yulo	1967	Law	LL.D. honoris causa	6th Chief Justice of the Philippine Supreme Court (1942–1945), Speaker of the Philippine House of Representatives (1939–1941), Secretary of Justice (1934–1938, 1966–67); Member of the Philippine House of Representatives, Negros Occidental's 3rd District (1938–1941)	
Rodil Zalameda	1987	Law	LL.B.	Associate Justice of the Philippine Supreme Court (2019–present), Associate Justice of the Philippine Court of Appeals (2008–2019)	
Alexander Gesmundo	1984	Law	J.D	27th Chief Justice of the Philippine Supreme Court	

=== Philippine Congress ===
==== Senators ====
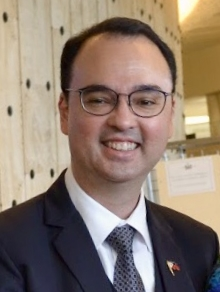
Alan Peter Cayetano

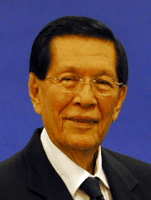
Juan Ponce Enrile

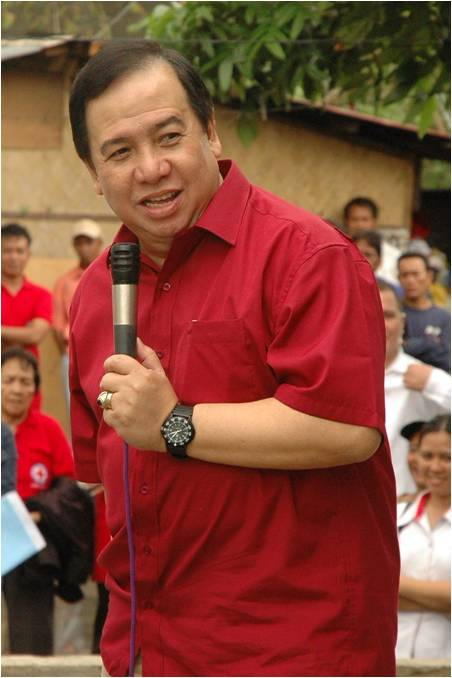
Richard J. Gordon

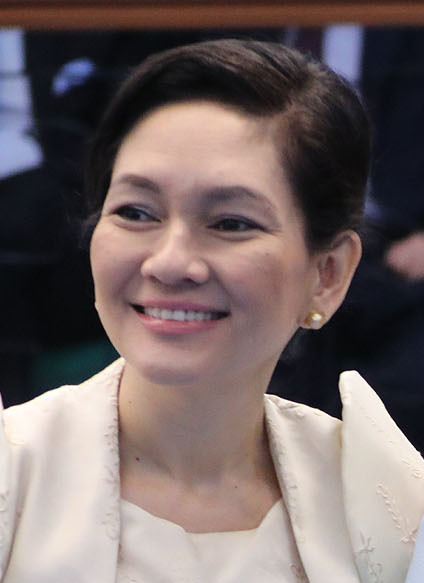
Risa Hontiveros

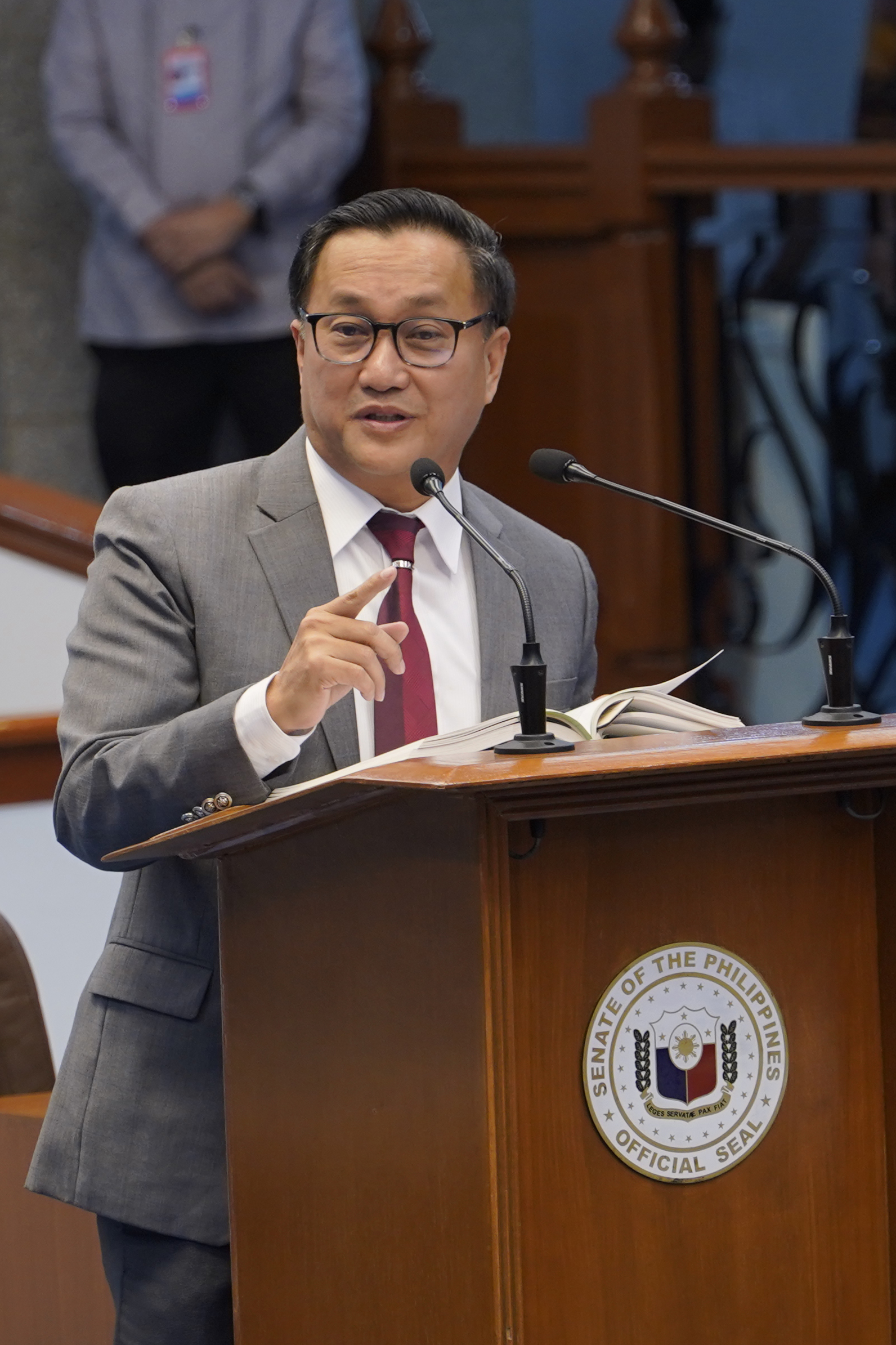
Francis Tolentino

Name	Class year	School(s)	Degree(s)	Notability	Ref.
Jose Altavas		MDM	A.B. (with Honors)	Philippine Senator (1916–1922), Governor of Capiz (1910–1916), 1934 Philippine Constitutional Convention delegate	
Benigno Aquino Jr.	DNG	GS, SAS	A.B. Philosophy, A.B. History	Philippine Senator (1967–1972), Governor of Tarlac (1961–1967)	
Bam Aquino	1991, 1995, 1999	GS, HS, SAS, Law (DNG)	B.S. Management Engineering summa cum laude	Philippine Senator (2013–2019), Chairman of the National Youth Commission (2003–2006)	
Alan Peter Cayetano	1997	Law	J.D.	Philippine Senator (2007–2017, 2022–present); Speaker of the Philippine House of Representatives (2019–2022); Member of the Philippine House of Representatives, Pateros–Taguig (1998–2007, 2019–2022); Secretary of Foreign Affairs (2017–18)	
Juan Ponce Enrile	1949	SAS	A.A. cum laude	Philippine Senator (1987–1992, 1995–2001, 2004–2016), President of the Philippine Senate (2008–2013), Minister of National Defense under Ferdinand Marcos (1970–71, 1972–1986), lead figure in the 1986 People Power Revolution, Chief Presidential Legal Counsel (2022–present)	
Jinggoy Estrada	1976, 1980	GS, HS	—N/a	Philippine Senator (2004–2016, 2022–present), President pro tempore of the Philippine Senate (2007–2013), Mayor of San Juan (1992–2001), Vice Mayor of San Juan (1988–1992), former actor	
Richard J. Gordon	1962, 1966	HS, SAS	A.B. History and Government	Philippine Senator (2004–2010, 2016–2022), Chairman of the Philippine Red Cross (since 2004), Secretary of Tourism (2001–2004), Chairman of the Subic Bay Metropolitan Authority (1992–1998), Mayor of Olongapo (1980–1986, 1988–1993)	
TG Guingona	1970, 1977, 1981, 1985	GS, HS, SAS, Law	A.B. Economics, J.D.	Philippine Senator (2010–2016); Member of the Philippine House of Representatives, Bukidnon's 2nd District (2004–2010)	
Risa Hontiveros	1987	SAS	A.B. Social Sciences cum laude	Philippine Senator (2016–present); Member of the Philippine House of Representatives, Akbayan (2004–2010)	
Ernesto Maceda	1952, 1956	SAS, Law	A.B. magna cum laude, LL.B. cum laude	Philippine Senator (1971–72, 1987–1998), President of the Philippine Senate (1996–1998), Philippine Ambassador to the United States (1998–2001)	
Sergio Osmeña Jr.	1935	SAS	A.A. cum laude	Philippine Senator (1965–1971), Mayor of Cebu City (1959–1963), Governor of Cebu (1951–1959)	
Ambrosio Padilla	1926, 1930	HS, SAS	A.B. summa cum laude	Philippine Senator (1957–1972), Senate Minority Floor Leader (1966–1969), Solicitor General of the Philippines (1954–1957), 1st President of the Philippine Olympic Committee (1970–1976); former basketball player (Ateneo Blue Eagles)	
Koko Pimentel	1977, 1981, 1985	GS, HS, SAS	B.S. Mathematics	Philippine Senator (2011–present), President of the Philippine Senate (2016–2018)	
Claro M. Recto	1909	SAS	A.B. maxima cum laude	Philippine Senator (1931–1935, 1945–46, 1952–1960), Associate Justice of the Philippine Supreme Court (1935–36); Member of the Philippine House of Representatives, Batangas' 3rd District (1919–1928)	
Soc Rodrigo	1934	SAS	A.B.	Philippine Senator (1955–1967), playwright, journalist	
Gerardo Roxas	1942	HS		Philippine Senator (1963–1972); Member of the Philippine House of Representatives, Capiz's 1st District (1957–1963)	
Wigberto Tañada	1948, 1952, 1956	GS, HS, SAS	A.B.	Philippine Senator (1987–1995), Senate Minority Floor Leader (1992–1995); Member of the Philippine House of Representatives, Quezon's 4th District (1995–2001)	
Francis Tolentino	1980, 1984	SAS, Law	A.B. Philosophy, LL.B.	Philippine Senator (2019–present), Chairman of the Metropolitan Manila Development Authority (2010–2015), Mayor of Tagaytay (1995–2004)	

==== Representatives ====
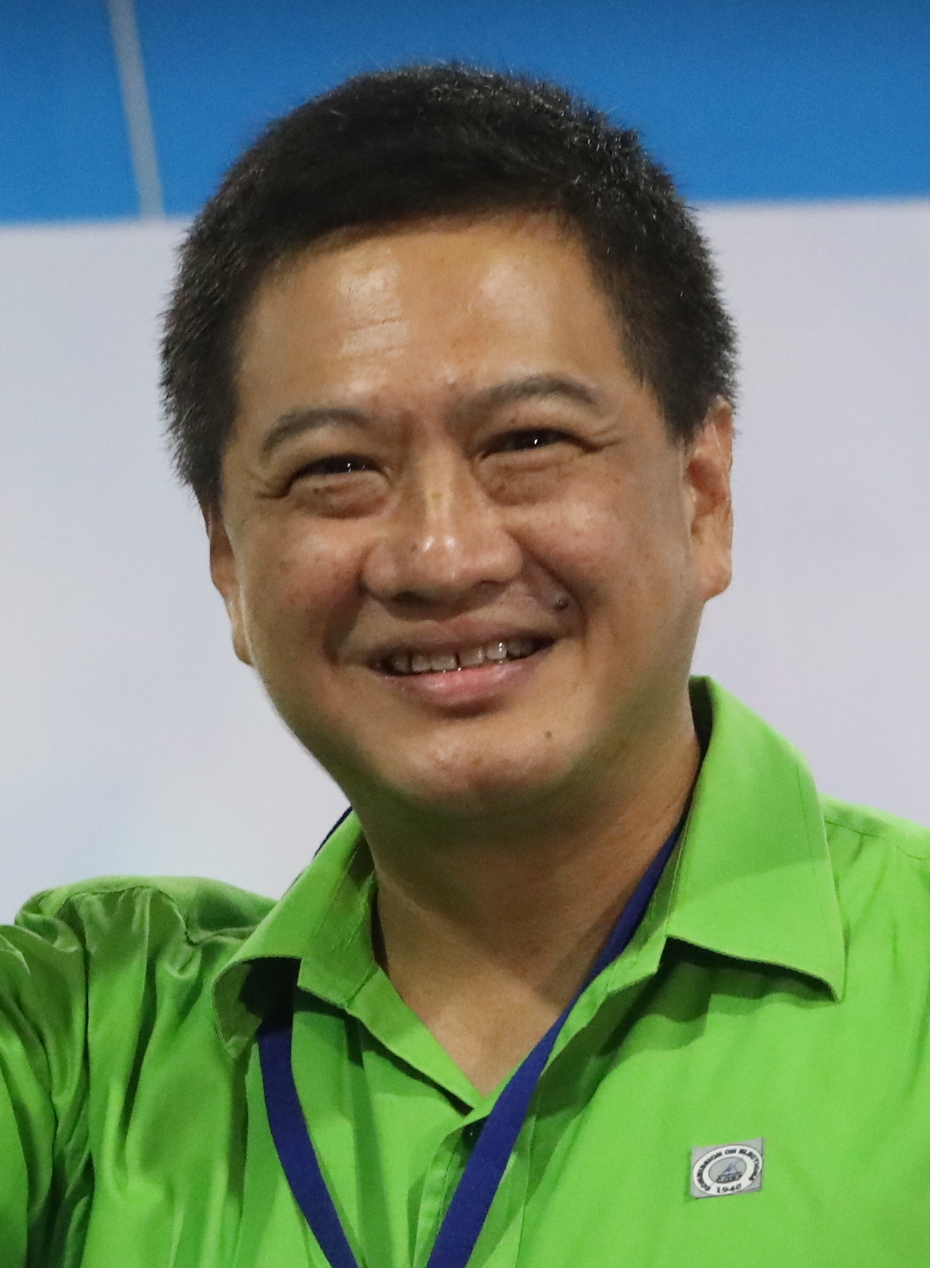
Erin Tañada

Name	Class year	School(s)	Degree(s)	Notability	Ref.
Pantaleon Alvarez	1983	Law	LL.B.	Speaker of the Philippine House of Representatives (2016–2018); Member of the Philippine House of Representatives, Davao del Norte's 1st District (1998–2001, 2016–present); Philippine Secretary of Transportation and Communications (2001–02)	
Herminio Aquino	1969	SAS	A.B. Economics magna cum laude	Member of the Philippine House of Representatives, Tarlac's 3rd District (1987–1998)	
Walden Bello	1966	SAS	A.B.	Member of the Philippine House of Representatives, Akbayan (2007–2015); professor	
Raul del Mar	1963	Law	LL.B.	Deputy Speaker of the Philippine House of Representatives (2004–2010); Member of the Philippine House of Representatives, Cebu City's 1st District (1987–1998, 2001–2010, 2013–present)	
Jack Enrile	1972, 1976	GS, HS	—N/a	Member of the Philippine House of Representatives, Cagayan's 1st District (1998–2007, 2010–2013); son of Juan Ponce Enrile	
Rodolfo Fariñas	1971, 1978	SAS, Law	A.B., LL.B.	Member of the Philippine House of Representatives, Ilocos Norte's 1st District (1998–2001, 2010–2019); Governor of Ilocos Norte (1988–1998), Mayor of Laoag (1980–1986)	
Felix William Fuentebella	1993 (HS), 1998–2001 (Law; DNG)	GS, HS, Law	LL.B	Member of the Philippine House of Representatives, Camarines Sur's 3rd District (2001–2004) and 4th District (2013–2016)	
Neptali Gonzales II	1979	Law	LL.B.	Member of the Philippine House of Representatives, Mandaluyong (1995–2004, 2007–2016, 2019–present); Mayor of Mandaluyong (2004–2007)	
Prospero Nograles	1967, 1971	SAS, Law	A.B. Political Science, LL.B.	Speaker of the Philippine House of Representatives (2008–2010); Member of the Philippine House of Representatives, Davao City's 1st District (1989–1992, 1995–1998, 2001–2010)	
Antonino P. Roman	1960	Law	LL.B.	Member of the Philippine House of Representatives, Bataan's 1st District (1998–2007)	
Ralph Recto	1975	GS		Member of the Philippine House of Representatives, Batangas's 4th District (1992-2001) and 6th District (2022–present); Philippine Senator (2001–2007, 2010–2022), President pro tempore of the Philippine Senate (2013–2016, 2017–present), Senate Minority Leader (2016–17), Director-General of the National Economic and Development Authority (2008–09)	
Joey Salceda	1982	SAS	B.S. Management Engineering cum laude	Member of the Philippine House of Representatives, Albay's 2nd District (2016–present) and 3rd District (1998–2007); Governor of Albay (2007–2016), Presidential Chief of Staff to Gloria Macapagal Arroyo (2007)	
Erin Tañada	1977, 1981, 1985	GS, HS, SAS	A.B. Political Science	Deputy Speaker of the Philippine House of Representatives (2010–2013); Member of the Philippine House of Representatives, Quezon's 4th District (2004–2013)	
Alfred Vargas	2002	SOSS	A.B. Management Economics	Member of the Philippine House of Representatives, Quezon City's 5th District (2013–present); actor	
Antolin Oreta III		GS, HS	—N/a	Member of the House of Representatives of the Philippines, Malabon's Lone District (2025-present)	

=== Mayors ===
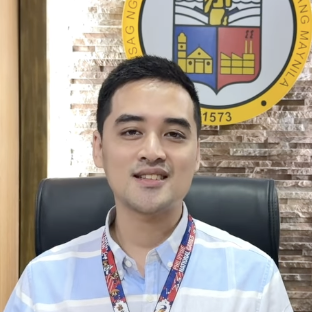
Vico Sotto

Name	Class year	School(s)	Degree(s)	Notability	Ref.
Joy Belmonte	1992	SAS	A.B. Social Sciences	Mayor of Quezon City (2019–present), former Vice Mayor of Quezon City (2010–2019)	
Abigail Binay	2001	Law	J.D.	Mayor of Makati (2016–present); Member of the Philippine House of Representatives, Makati's 2nd District (2007–2016)	
Arsenio Lacson	1930, 1934	HS, SAS	A.B.	17th Mayor of Manila (1952–1962), journalist; Member of the Philippine House of Representatives, Manila's 2nd District (1949–1952)	
Kit Nieto		HS, SAS, Law	A.B. Political Science, LL.B.	Mayor of Cainta (2013–present)	
Vico Sotto	2011, 2018	SOSS, SoG	A.B. Political Science, MPM	Mayor of Pasig (2019–present); Councilor of Pasig (2016–2019)	
Marcelino Teodoro	1997	SAS	M.A. Teaching Philosophy	Mayor of Marikina (2016–present); Member of the Philippine House of Representatives, Marikina's 1st District (2007–2016)	
Donya Tesoro	2018	SoG	MPM	Mayor of San Manuel, Tarlac (2019–present); Vice Mayor of San Manuel, Tarlac (2016–2019); Councilor of San Manuel, Tarlac (2013–2016)	
Toby Tiangco		SAS	B.S. Management	Mayor of Navotas (2000–2010, 2019–2022); Member of the Philippine House of Representatives, Navotas (2010–2019, 2022–present)	
Antolin Oreta III		GS, HS	—N/a	Mayor of Malabon (2012-2022); Vice Mayor of Malabon (2010-2012); Member of the Malabon City Council (2007-2010)	

=== Other Philippine political figures ===
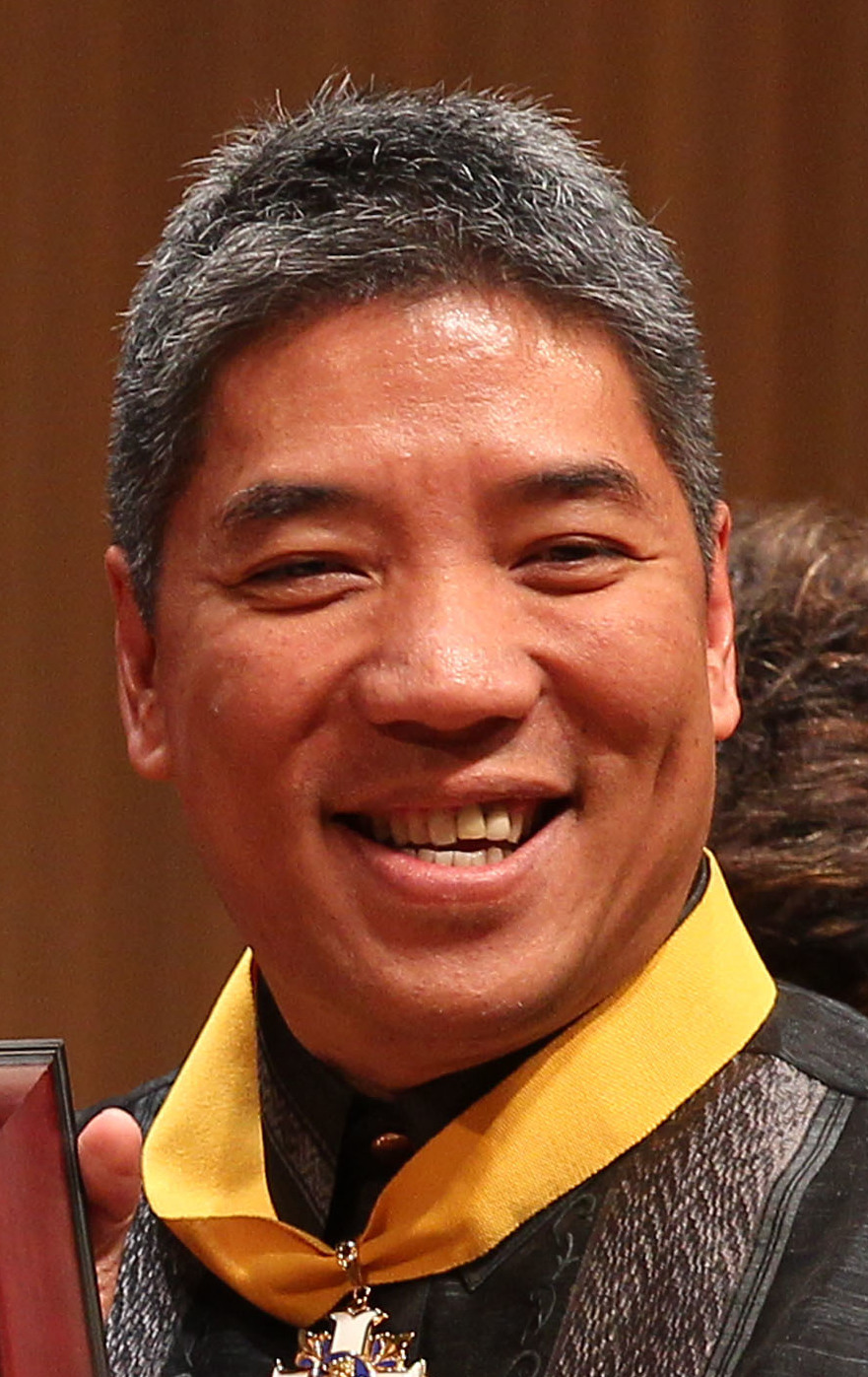
Ambeth Ocampo

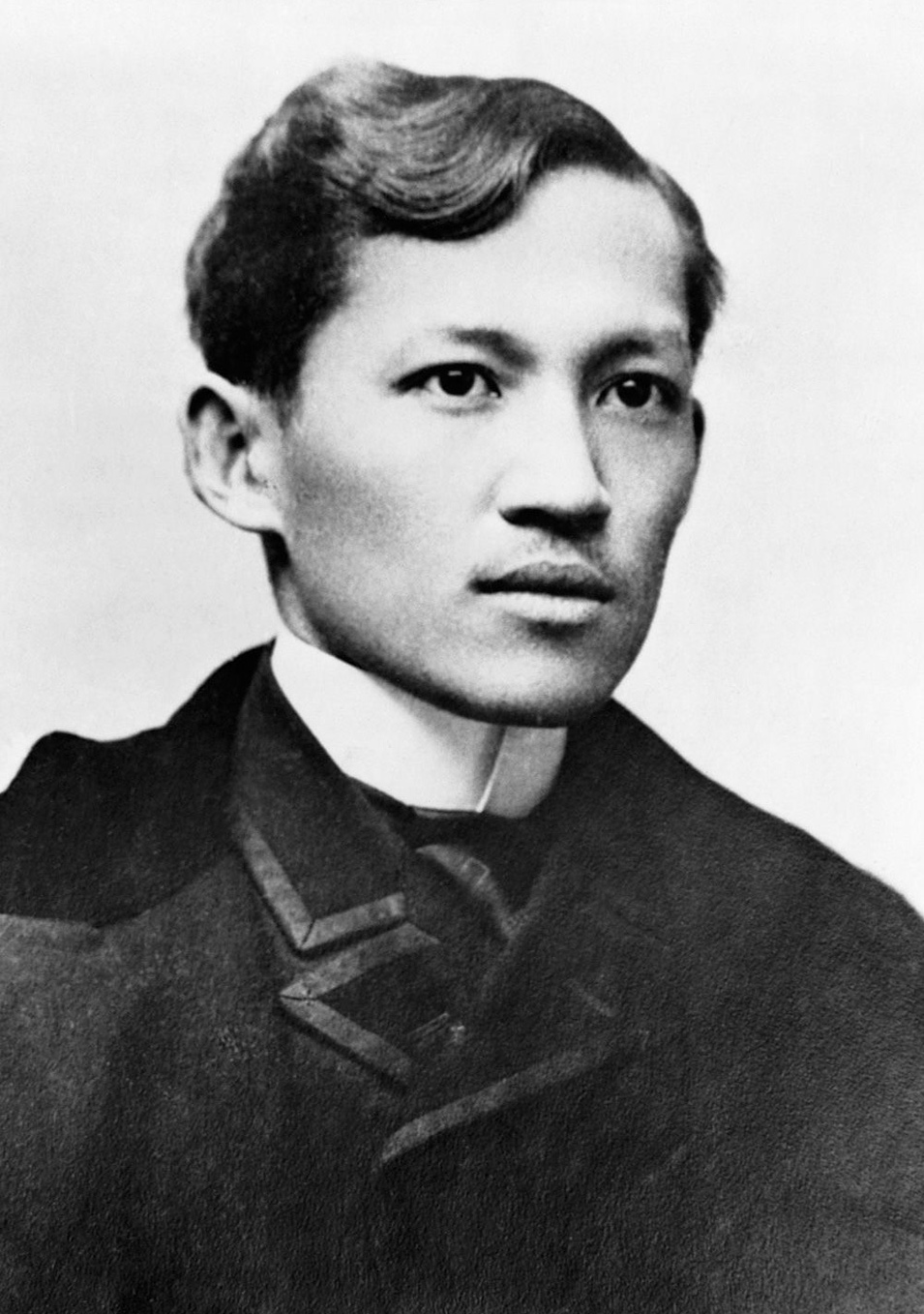
José Rizal

Name	Class year	School(s)	Degree(s)	Notability	Ref.
Liza Araneta Marcos	1981 (BA), 1985 (Law)	SAS, Law	B.A. Interdisciplinary Studies, LL.B.	First Lady of the Philippines (2022–present)	
Jose Miguel Arroyo	1972 (Law)	GS, HS, SAS, Law	A.B. Political Science, LL.B.	First Gentleman of the Philippines (2001–2010)	
Andres Bautista	1986, 1990	SAS, Law	B.S. Legal Management, LL.B. (valedictorian)	Chairman of the Commission on Elections (2015–2017), former Dean of the Far Eastern University Institute of Law	
Felipe Calderón	1883 (MDM)	GS, HS, MDM	A.B.	Lawyer, "father of the Malolos Constitution"	
Rafael Crame		MDM	A.B.	Chief of the former Philippine Constabulary (1917–1927)	
Gabriel Daza	1914		B.A	First Filipino Electrical Engineer, co-founder of the Boy Scouts of the Philippines (BSP) and PLDT	
Epifanio de los Santos		MDM	A.B. summa cum laude	Historian, literary critic, jurist, journalist, scholar, member of the Revolutionary Government, Director of the National Library and Museum of the Philippines (1925–1928), namesake of EDSA	
Edgar Jopson	1970 (SAS)	GS, HS, SAS	B.S. Management Engineering cum laude	Student activist and member of the Communist Party of the Philippines during the presidency of Ferdinand Marcos	
Ambeth Ocampo	1981, 1985	GS, HS	—N/a	Historian, Chairman of the National Historical Commission of the Philippines (2002–2011)	
José Palma		MDM		Poet, lyricist of "Lupang Hinirang"	
Pedro Paterno	1871	MDM	A.B.	Reformist, poet, and novelist of the Revolutionary Government	
José Rizal	1877	MDM	A.B. sobresaliente	National hero of the Philippines, reformist of Spanish colonial Philippines under the Propaganda Movement, writer (Noli Me Tángere, El filibusterismo, La solidaridad), founder of La Liga Filipina	
Rodolfo Severino Jr.	1952, 1956	HS, SAS	A.B. Humanities	Diplomat, 10th Secretary General of the Association of Southeast Asian Nations (1998−2002)	
Jose Maria Sison	1953–54 (transferred)	HS		Founder of the Communist Party of the Philippines	

== Law ==
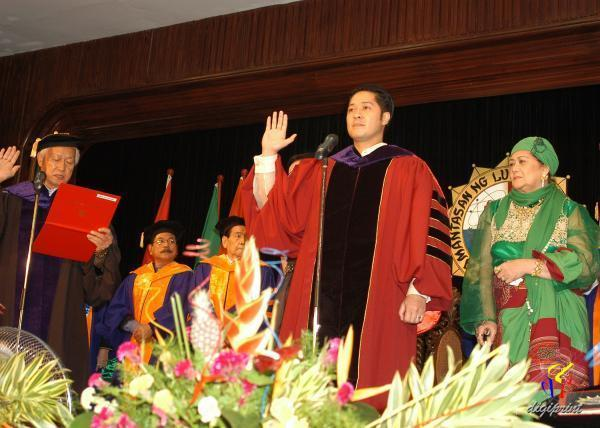
Adel Tamano

Name	Class year	School(s)	Degree(s)	Notability	Ref.
Felipe Agoncillo		MDM		Lawyer representative to the negotiations of the Treaty of Paris (1898), "first Filipino diplomat"	
Cesario Azucena		Law	LL.B.	Labor lawyer, professor, author	
Sedfrey Candelaria	1980, 1984	SAS, Law	A.B. Political Science, LL.B.	Dean of the Ateneo Law School (2012–present)	
Antonio La Viña	1980	SAS	A.B. Philosophy	Lawyer, educator, environmental policy expert; Dean of the Ateneo School of Government (2006–2016), Philippine Undersecretary of Environment for Legal and Legislative Affairs (1996–1998)	
Tranquil Salvador III	1991	Law	J.D.	Bar Examiner, Remedial Law (2018 Bar Examinations); Author, Criminal Procedure; Remedial Law Reviewer; Dean, Manila Adventist College-School of Law and Jurisprudence; and Former Dean, Pamantasan ng Lungsod ng Pasay	
Adel Tamano	1992, 1996	SAS, Law	A.B. Economics, J.D.	Lawyer, Dean of the Liceo de Cagayan University College of Law (2011–present), former President of the University of the City of Manila (2007–2009)	
Eugene A. Tan	1967	Law	LL.B. (valedictorian)	Human rights lawyer murdered in 1994	
Tonisito Umali	1992, 1997	SAS, Law	B.S. Legal Management, J.D.	Lawyer, radio host, Philippine Undersecretary of Education for Legislative Liaison (2017–present), Assistant Education Secretary for Legal Affairs (2010–2017)	
Cesar L. Villanueva	1981	Law	LL.B. cum laude (valedictorian)	Dean of the Ateneo Law School (2004–2012)	

== Media and communications ==
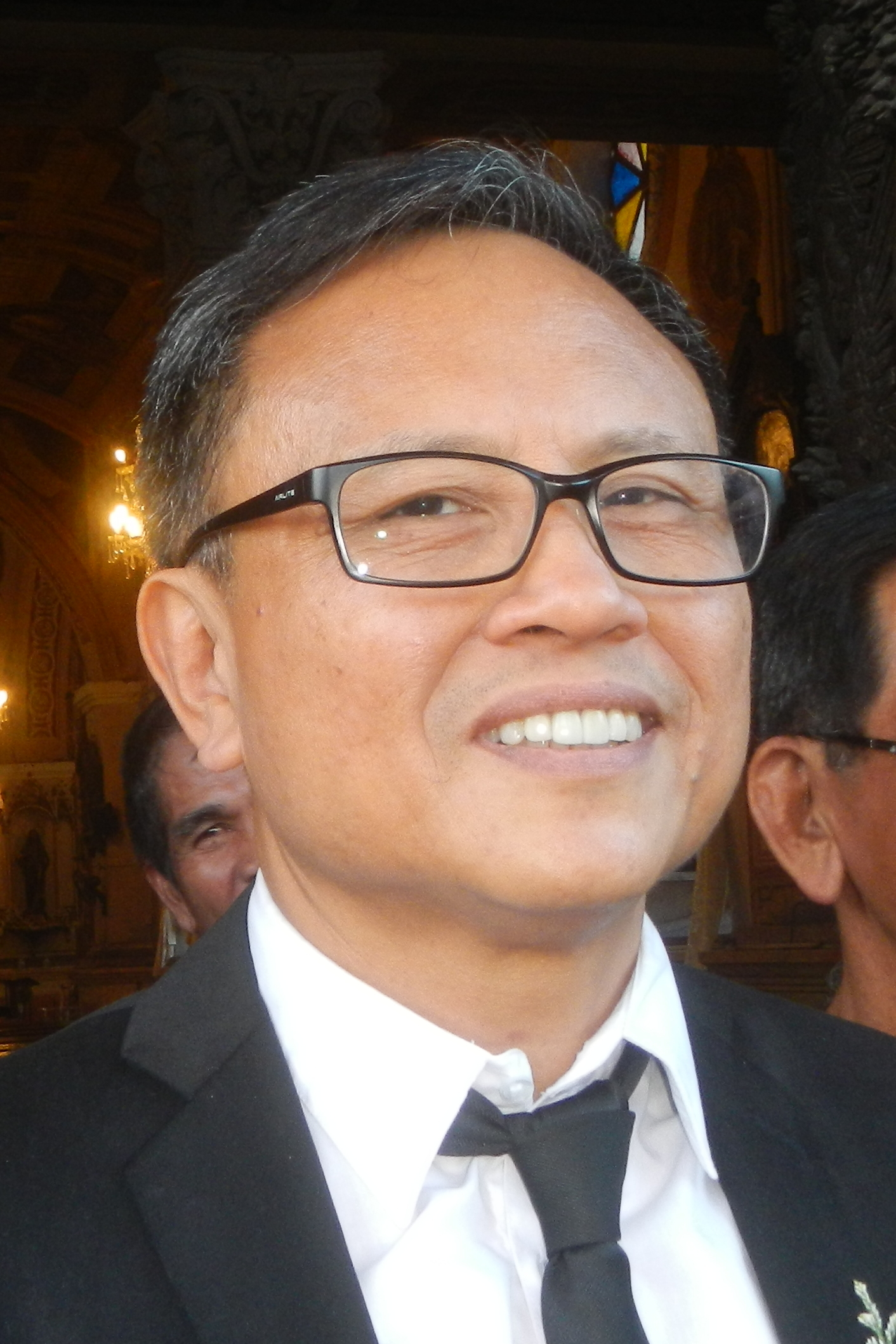
Howie Severino

Name	Class year	School(s)	Degree(s)	Notability	Ref.
Atom Araullo	1994	GS	—N/a	Journalist, television host	
Pia Arcangel	2000	SOH	A.B. Communication	Journalist, television news anchor	
Paolo Bediones	1988, 1992, 1996	GS, HS, SAS	A.B. Interdisciplinary Studies	Television host, newscaster (TV5), radio commentator	
Shujaat Bukhari	2007	SOSS	M.A. Journalism	Kashmiri journalist, founding editor of Rising Kashmir	
Jeff Canoy	2007	SOSS	A.B. Communication	Journalist, television news anchor, field reporter for ABS-CBN News and Current Affairs	
Ricky Carandang	1985, 1989	HS, SAS	A.B. Management Economics	Journalist, television news anchor, former Presidential Communications Development and Strategic Planning Office Secretary under Benigno Aquino III	
Lia Cruz	2007	SOSS	A.B. Communication	Television host, sportscaster	
Mico Halili	1987, 1991, 1995	GS, HS, SAS	A.B. Communication	Sports journalist, sportscaster	
Pia Hontiveros	1989	SAS	A.B. Interdisciplinary Studies	Broadcast journalist, chief correspondent for CNN Philippines	
Teddy Boy Locsin		GS, HS, SAS	AA	Journalist (Philippines Free Press)	
Vicky Morales	1990	SAS	A.B. Communication cum laude	Broadcast journalist, television anchor (GMA News)	
Ala Paredes	2004	SOSS	A.B. Communication	Australian correspondent for ABS-CBN News, activist, writer, singer (Hiraya), courtroom sketch artist	
Maria Ressa	2022	—N/a	Ph.D. Sociology (honoris causa)	Journalist, CEO of Rappler, 2021 Nobel Peace Prize laureate	
Chino Roces		GS, HS	—N/a	Founder of The Manila Times and the Associated Broadcasting Company	
Korina Sanchez	2016	SOSS	M.A. Journalism	Broadcast journalist, radio and television news anchor, magazine show host, newspaper columnist	
Sev Sarmenta	1978	SAS	A.B. Communication	Sports journalist, sportscaster	
Howie Severino	1975, 1979	GS, HS	—N/a	Broadcast journalist, editor-in chief of GMA News Online (2009−2014)	
Max Soliven	1941, 1947, 1951	GS, HS, SAS	A.B. Communication	Co-founder of The Philippine Star	

== Science and technology ==
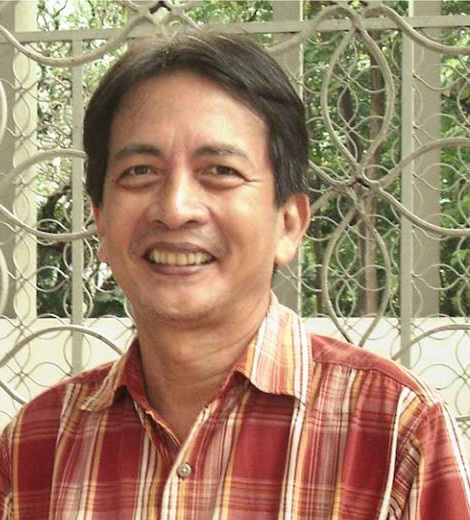
Michael Tan

Name	Class year	School(s)	Degree(s)	Notability	Ref.
Anne Aaron	1998	SAS	B.S. Physics, B.S. Computer Engineering	Engineer, director of video algorithms at Netflix	
Alfredo Bengzon	1956, 1972, 1989	SAS, PS (incl. GSB)	A.B., MBA, Sc.D. honoris causa	Doctor, educator, former public official; Vice President for the Professional Schools of the Ateneo de Manila University, dean of the Ateneo School of Medicine and Public Health, dean emeritus of the Ateneo Graduate School of Business, President and CEO of The Medical City	
Rica Cruz	2015, 2020	SOSS	MA Counseling Psychology, PhD Clinical Psychology	Licensed psychologist specializing in sex and relationship therapy in the Philippines	
Assunta Cuyegkeng	1978	SAS	B.S. Chemistry summa cum laude	Educator, researcher, Professor at the Ateneo Department of Chemistry, former vice president for the Loyola Schools, first female summa cum laude recipient of the university	
Margie Holmes		SAS	Ph.D. in Clinical Psychology	Clinical psychologist, sex therapist	
Lawrence Que Jr.	1969	SAS	B.S. Chemistry	Inorganic chemist, Regents Professor at the University of Minnesota	
Tricia Robredo	2014, 2020	SOSE, SMPH	B.S. Health Sciences, M.D., MBA	Physician, former UAAP courtside reporter for the National University Bulldogs (2013−2014)	
Michael Tan	DNG (transferred)	SAS	B.S. Biology	Medical anthropologist, veterinarian, writer, academic, former Chancellor of the University of the Philippines Diliman (2014–2020)	

== Sports ==
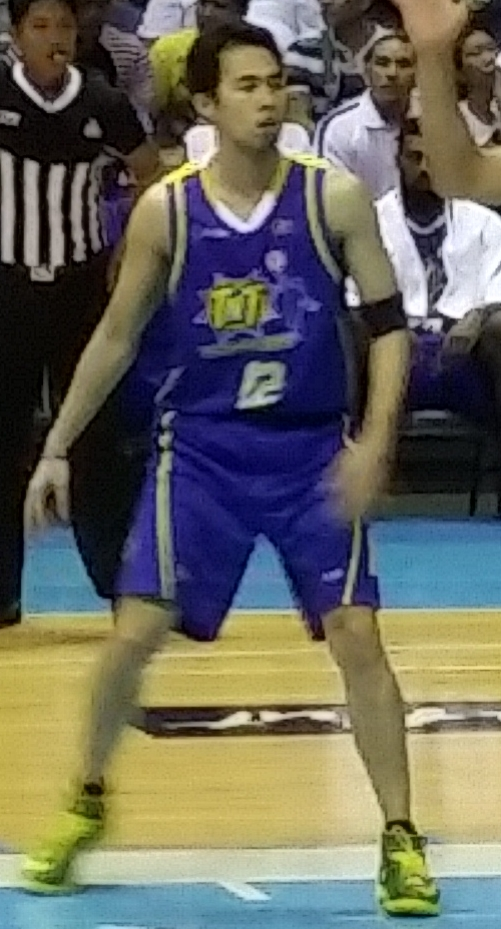
Larry Fonacier

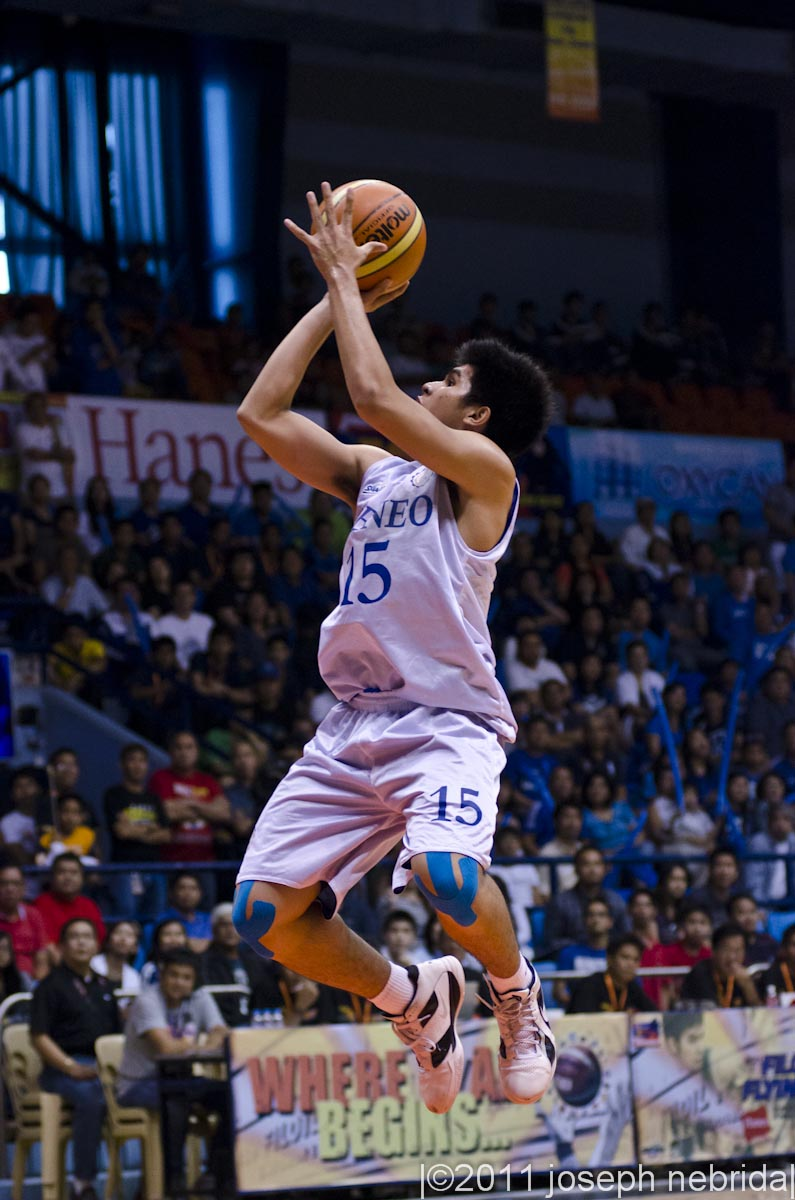
Kiefer Ravena

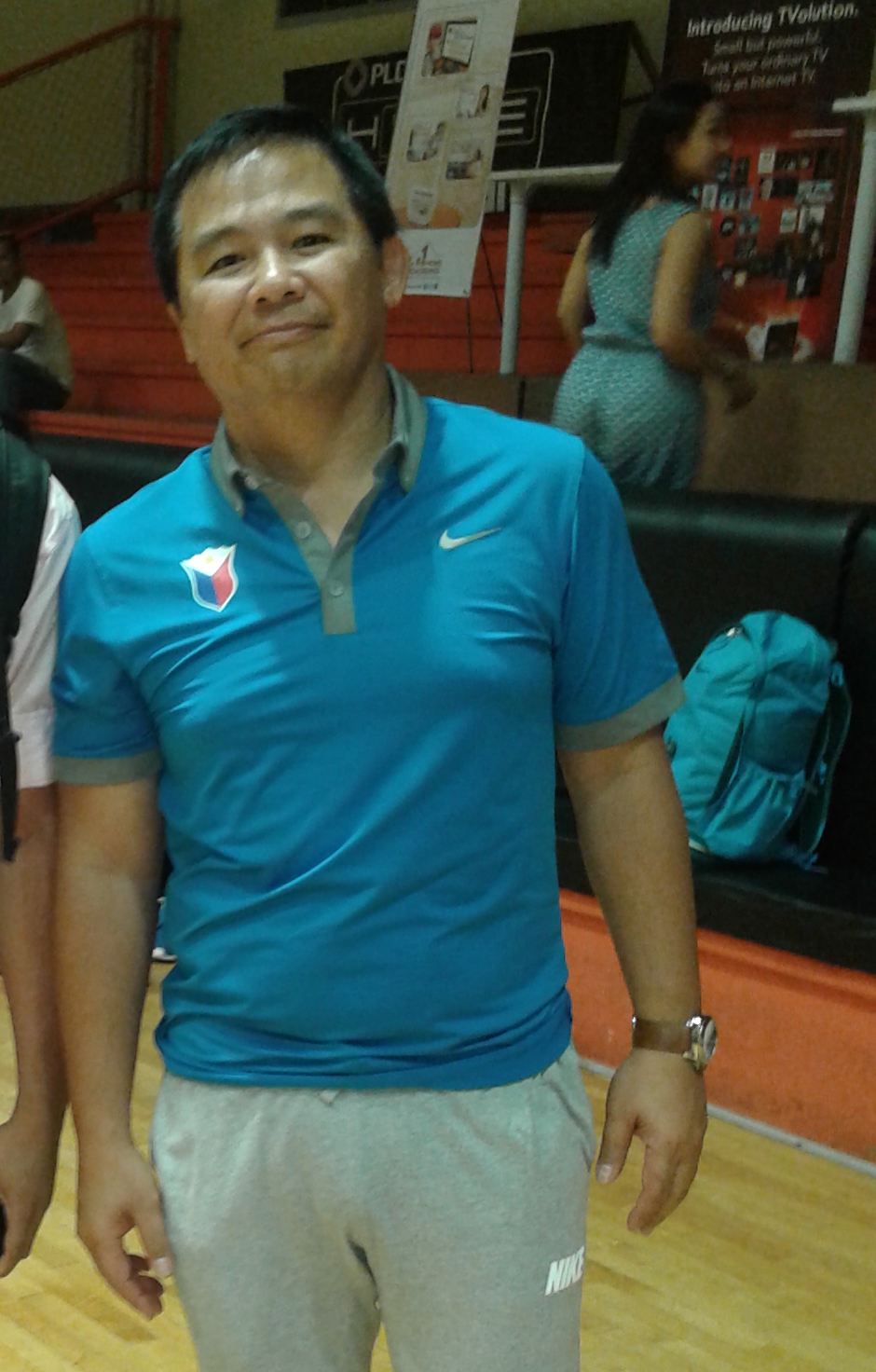
Chot Reyes

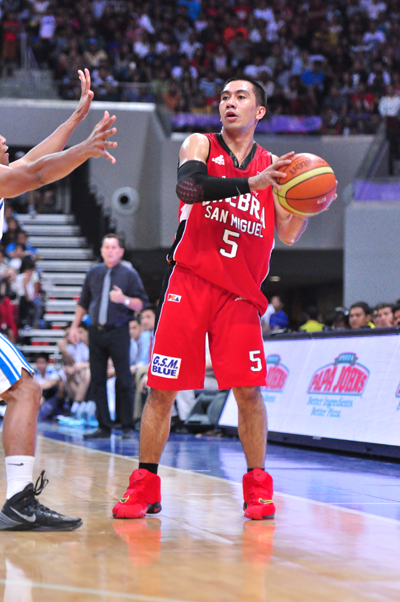
LA Tenorio

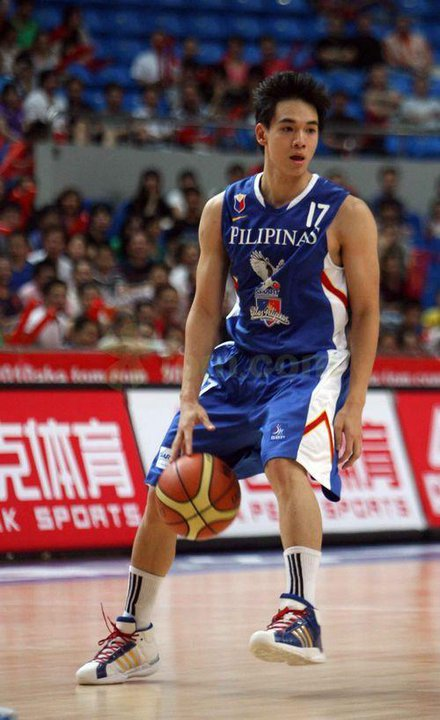
Chris Tiu

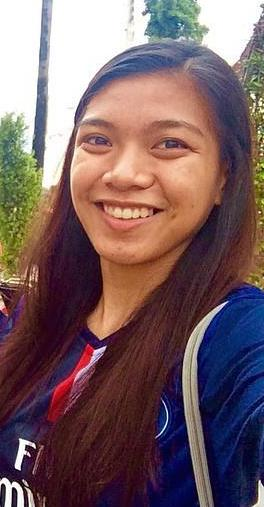
Alyssa Valdez

Name	Class year	School(s)	Degree(s)	Notability	Ref.
Maxie Abad		Law	LL.B.	Retired international footballer for the Philippines national team (1986–1996), lawyer	
Japeth Aguilar	2003–2005 (DNG)	LS		Professional basketball player for the Barangay Ginebra San Miguel, former Ateneo Blue Eagles player	
Amy Ahomiro	2015	SOSS	A.B. Communication	Volleyball player, former Ateneo Lady Eagles player	
Rabeh Al-Hussaini	2010	SOH	A.B. Interdisciplinary Studies	Professional basketball player, former Ateneo Blue Eagles player (2005–2010)	
Rich Alvarez	2001	SOM	B.S. Management Information Systems	Former professional basketball player and coach, former Ateneo Blue Eagles player	
Francis Arnaiz	1969–70	SAS		Former professional basketball player, former Ateneo Blue Eagles player (1969)	
Nonoy Baclao	2010	SOH	A.B. Interdisciplinary Studies	Professional basketball player, former Ateneo Blue Eagles player (2007–2009)	
Jun Bernardino	1962, 1966	GS, HS	—N/a	Commissioner of the Philippine Basketball Association (1994–2002), former Ateneo Blue Eaglets player	
Ryan Buenafe	2013	LS	A.B.	Professional basketball player, former Ateneo Blue Eagles player	
Paolo Bugia	2003	SOM, GSB	B.S. Management Information Systems, MBA	Team manager of the Phoenix Super LPG Fuel Masters, former professional basketball player, former Ateneo Blue Eagles player	
Fille Cayetano	2013, 2019	SOSS, GSB	A.B. Psychology, MBA	Professional volleyball player, former Ateneo Lady Eagles player	
Mikee Cojuangco-Jaworski	1996	SAS	A.B. Psychology	Equestrienne (2002 Asian Games gold medalist), actress, model, television host, member of the International Olympic Committee (2013–present)	
Baby Dalupan	1938, 1942, 1949	GS, HS, SAS		Basketball coach and player, former Ateneo Blue Eagles player and head coach (1972–1977, 1993)	
Bea de Leon	2018	SOSS	A.B. Management Economics	Professional Volleyball player, former Ateneo Lady Eagles captain, 2 time UAAP champion, UAAP Season 81 Finals MVP	
Marck Espejo	2018	SOH	A.B. Interdisciplinary Studies	Professional volleyball player for the Cignal HD spikers, former Ateneo Blue Eagles captain, played as an import in Thailand for Visakha and Bahrain for Bani Jamra	
Maxine Esteban	2022	SOM	B.S. Management Engineering	Olympic fencer, former Ateneo Women's Fencing captain	
Larry Fonacier	1996, 2000, 2004	GS, HS, SOH	A.B. Interdisciplinary Studies, M.A. Communication	Professional basketball player, former Ateneo Blue Eaglets (1996–2000) and Blue Eagles player (2000–2004)	
Jarvey Gayoso	2015, 2021	HS, SOM	B.S. Management	Professional and international football player for the Philippines national team, former Ateneo Blue Eagles player (2015–2019)	
Angeline Gervacio	2013	SOSS	A.B. Political Science	Volleyball player, former Ateneo Lady Eagles player	
Wesley Gonzales	1994, 1998, 2002, 2008	GS, HS, SOM, SOSE	B.S. Management Information Systems, M.S. Computer Science, MBA	Former professional basketball player, former Ateneo Blue Eagles player (1998–2002)	
Gretchen Ho	2013	SOSE, SOH	B.S. Management Engineering, A.B. Communication	Former volleyball player for the Petron Blaze Spikers, television host, co-founder of the Beach Volleyball Republic, former Ateneo Lady Eagles player (2008–2013)	
Robert Jaworski Jr.	1995	SAS	B.S. Management	Former basketball player; Vice Mayor of Pasig (2022–present); Member of the Philippine House of Representatives, Pasig (2004–2007)	
Ange Kouame	2023	SOH	A.B. Interdisciplinary Studies	Basketball player, former Ateneo Blue Eagles player (2018–2022; UAAP Season 84 MVP)	
Doug Kramer	2007	LS		Former basketball player, former Ateneo Blue Eagles player	
Jojo Lastimosa	1983–84 (DNG)	SAS		Former professional basketball player and current assistant coach for the NLEX Road Warriors, former Ateneo Blue Eagles player (1981–1983)	
Denden Lazaro	2015, 2016–17 (DNG)	SOSS, AMPH	B.S. Biology	Volleyball player, former Ateneo Lady Eagles player, sportscaster	
Moro Lorenzo	1947, 1951	HS, SAS	A.B.	Basketball player (1951 Asian Games gold medalist), former Ateneo Blue Eagles player	
Maddie Madayag	2019	SOH	A.B. Interdisciplinary Studies	Professional volleyball player for the Kurobe AquaFairies and the Philippines national team, former Ateneo Lady Eagles player (2014–2019)	
Jia Morado	2017	SOSS	B.S. Psychology	Volleyball player for the Creamline Cool Smashers and the Philippines national team, former Ateneo Lady Eagles player (2013–2017)	
EJ Obiena	2012–2013 (DNG)	SOM	B.S. Communications Technology Management	Olympic pole vaulter, Asian pole vault record holder, former Ateneo Blue Trackster (2012–2013)	
Ed Ocampo	1951, 1955, 1959	GS, HS, SAS	B.S. Business Administration	Basketball player and coach, former Ateneo Blue Eagles player (1957–1959)	
Von Pessumal	2007, 2011, 2015	GS, HS, SOSS	A.B. Communication	Professional basketball player for San Miguel Beermen, former Ateneo Blue Eagles player (2011–2015)	
Kiefer Ravena	2007, 2011, 2016	GS, HS, SOM	B.S. Communications Technology Management	Professional basketball player for the NLEX Road Warriors, former Ateneo Blue Eaglets (2008–2011) and Blue Eagles player (2011–2016), National Team Player	
Thirdy Ravena	2009, 2013, 2019	GS, HS, SOM	B.S. Communications Technology Management	Professional basketball player for the San-en NeoPhoenix and the Philippines national team, former Ateneo Blue Eaglets (2009–2013) and Blue Eagles player (2014-2019), 3-time UAAP Finals MVP	
Chot Reyes	1977, 1981, 1985	GS, HS, SAS	A.B. Interdisciplinary Studies	Basketball head coach (PBA; Philippine national team), former president of TV5 Network (2016–2019)	
Jai Reyes	2001, 2005, 2010	GS, HS, SOM	B.S. Communications Technology Management	Professional basketball player, former Ateneo Blue Eaglets and Blue Eagles player	
Toni Rivero		SOH	A.B. Interdisciplinary Studies	Taekwondo practitioner (2004 and 2008 Summer Olympics)	
Charo Soriano	2008	SOSS	A.B. Economics	Volleyball player and coach, former Ateneo Lady Eagles player (2003–2008)	
LA Tenorio	2006	SOH	A.B. Interdisciplinary Studies	Professional basketball player, former Ateneo Blue Eagles player (2001–2006)	
Akiko Thomson	2003	GSB	MBA	Retired swimmer (1988, 1992 and 1996 Summer Olympics)	
Chris Tiu	2007, 2009	SOM, SOSE	B.S. Management Engineering cum laude, B.S./M.A. Applied Mathematical Finance	Former professional basketball player for the Rain or Shine Elasto Painters, former Ateneo Blue Eagles player, television host	
Alyssa Valdez	2015	SOSS	A.B. Psychology	Professional volleyball player for the Creamline Cool Smashers and the Philippines national team, former Ateneo Lady Eagles captain (two-time champion, three-time UAAP MVP)	
Enrico Villanueva	1994, 1998, 2002, 2004	GS, HS, SOSS	A.B. Development Studies, M.A. Communication	Former professional basketball player, former Ateneo Blue Eaglets and Blue Eagles player (1998−2002)	
Deanna Wong	2016−present	SOH	A.B. Interdisciplinary Studies	Professional volleyball player, Ateneo Lady Eagles player	
Esmilzo Joner Polvorosa	2018	SOSS	AB European Studies	Former Ateneo Blue Eagles volleyball player, the only five-time UAAP Best Setter	

== See also ==
- Category:Ateneo de Manila University alumni
- List of Ateneo de Manila University faculty
