= TR90 =

TR90 may refer to:

- Trabzon Subregion (TR90), a statistical subregion of Turkey
- EMI TR90, a British Tape Recorder
- TR90 resin, a material used by Sunnies Studios
