= Luisa Igloria =

American poet (born 1961)

Luisa Aguilar Igloria
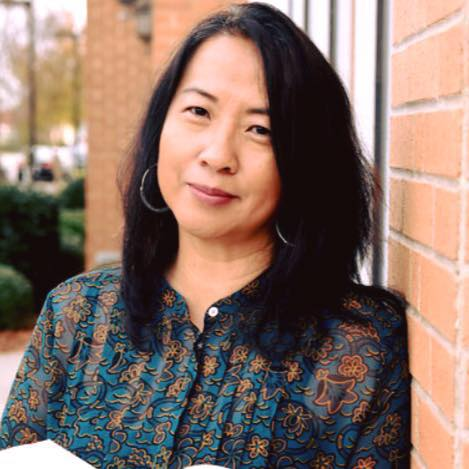
- Born: 1961 (age 64–65); Baguio, Philippines
- Education: University of the Philippines Baguio (B.A.); Ateneo de Manila University (M.A.); University of Illinois at Chicago (PhD)
- Occupation: Writer

Luisa A. Igloria (born 1961) is a Filipina American poet and author of various award-winning collections, and is Poet Laureate of Virginia, Emerita (2020–2022).

== Early life and education ==
Luisa Aguilar Igloria was born in 1961 in Makati, Philippines. She earned her Bachelor of Arts degree in humanities, graduating cum laude with a major in comparative literature, a minor in English, and a cognate in philosophy from the University of the Philippines Baguio in 1980. She then obtained her Master of Arts in Literature at Ateneo de Manila University in 1988, where she was a Robert Southwell Fellow. Igloria completed her Ph.D. in English/Creative Writing at University of Illinois at Chicago in July 1995, where she was a Fulbright Fellow.

== Career ==
Originally from Baguio City, Philippines, Luisa A. Igloria is the author of 15 full-length books and 5 chapbooks. She is Eminent Scholar, Louis I. Jaffe Professor, and University Professor of English and Creative Writing and English, and from 2009 to 2015 was director of the MFA Creative Writing Program at Old Dominion University.

In the Spring Term 2018, Igloria was the inaugural Glasgow Visiting Writer in Residence at Washington & Lee University. She was a visiting humanities scholar in 1996 at the Center for Philippine Studies at the University of Hawaii at Manoa. She taught briefly at De La Salle University where she became the graduate programs coordinator and senior associate for poetry at the Bienvenido N. Santos Creative Writing Center at De La Salle University. While in Chicago, she was an active member of PINTIG, a Filipino-American cultural and theatre group, where she served in PINTIG's cultural and education committee.

Igloria's work has appeared or been accepted in numerous anthologies and journals including New England Review, The Common, Poetry, Crab Orchard Review, Orion Magazine, The Missouri Review, Indiana Review, Poetry East, Natural Bridge, Umbrella, Sweet, qarrtsiluni, poemeleon, Smartish Pace, Rattle, The North American Review, Bellingham Review, Shearsman (UK), PRISM International (Canada), Poetry Salzburg Review (Austria), The Asian Pacific American Journal, and TriQuarterly, among others. Her work is included in the very first electronic anthology of Women's Poetry Fire On Her Tongue (Two Sylvias Press, 2011), Language for a New Century, ed. Tina Chang, Ravi Shankar, and Nathalie Handal (W.W. Norton, 2008), and Letters to the World: Poems from the Wom-po Listserv], ed. by Moira Richards, Rosemary Starace, and Lesley Wheeler (Red Hen Press, 2007). She edited the anthology Not Home, But Here: Writing from the Filipino Diaspora (Anvil, 2003); and more recently (with Aileen Cassinetto and David Hassler), The Nature of Our Times: Poems on America's Lands, Waters, Wildlife, and Other Natural Wonders (Paloma Press, 2025); (with Aileen Cassinetto and Jeremy Hoffman) Dear Human at the Edge of Time: Poems on Climate Change in the United States (Paloma Press, 2023); and (with Amanda Galvan Huynh), the anthology Of Color: Poets' Ways of Making (New York: The Operating System, 2018).

In July, 2020, the governor of Virginia appointed Igloria as the 20th poet laureate of the Commonwealth of Virginia.

== Personal life ==
Luisa Aguilar Igloria is married to Ruben V. Igloria, who is from Chicago. They have four daughters: Jennifer Patricia A. Cariño, Julia Katrina A. Parlette-Cariño, Josephine Anne A. Cariño, and Gabriela Aurora Igloria.

== Awards ==
In July 2020, then Governor Ralph Northam appointed Luisa A. Igloria the 20th Poet Laureate of the Commonwealth of Virginia (2020–22); she was at the time the 4th poet of color to receive this distinction. The Academy of American Poets awarded her 1 of 23 Poet Laureate Fellowships in 2021. She is highly decorated for her expanse of work: Luisa is an eleven-time (five First Prizes, plus six lesser prizes) recipient of the Don Carlos Palanca Memorial Awards for Literature in three genres (poetry, nonfiction, and short fiction); the Palanca award is the Philippines' highest literary distinction. In 1996 she became the first Filipina woman of letters installed in the Palanca Literary Hall of Fame. She is also the recipient of the 1988 Black Warrior Literary Award from the literary magazine of the University of Alabama; the Charles Goodnow Endowed Award for Creative Writing from the Chicago Bar Association in 1993 and 1995; the 1998 Illinois Arts Council Literary Award and the George Kent Prize for Poetry.

Her awards include the Immigrant Writing Series Prize from Black Lawrence Press for Caulbearer (2024), 2019 Crab Orchard Open Poetry Competition Prize for Maps for Migrants and Ghosts, Southern Illinois University Press, 2020; the 2018 Center for the Book Arts (New York) Poetry Chapbook Prize for What is Left of Wings, I Ask; the (inaugural) 2015 Resurgence Prize for Ecopoetry] (UK); the 2014 May Swenson Poetry Prize from Utah State University Press for Ode to the Heart Smaller than a Pencil Eraser; the 2009 Ernest Sandeen Prize in Poetry from the University of Notre Dame Press; the 2007 49th Parallel Prize in Poetry from Bellingham Review; the 2007 James Hearst Poetry Prize (selected by former US Poet Laureate Ted Kooser); the 2006 National Writers Union Poetry Prize (selected by Adrienne Rich); the 2006 Stephen Dunn Award for Poetry; the first Sylvia Clare Brown Fellowship, Ragdale Foundation (Summer 2006 Residency); Finalist for the 2005 George Bogin Memorial Award for Poetry (Poetry Society of America; selected by Joy Harjo); the 2005 Richard Lemon Poetry Fellowship to the Napa Valley Writers Conference; First Prize in the 2004 Fugue poetry contest (selected by Ellen Bryant Voigt); Finalist in the 2003 Larry Levis Editors Prize for Poetry from The Missouri Review; Finalist in the 2003 Dorset Prize for Poetry (Tupelo Press); a 2003 partial fellowship to the Summer Literary Seminars in St. Petersburg; three Pushcart Prize nominations and the 1998 George Kent Award for Poetry.

== Books and publications ==
- Since November 20, 2010, Luisa has been writing (at least) a poem a day as part of her daily writing practice.
- Other works are listed through her website and in various online publications.

Books:

- Cordillera Tales (New Day, 1990); 1991 National Book Award (Manila Critics Circle, Philippines)
- Cartography (Anvil, 1992); 1993 National Book Award for Poetry (Manila Critics Circle, Philippines)
- Encanto (Anvil, 1993); 1994 National Book Award for Poetry (Manila Critics Circle, Philippines)
- In the Garden of the Three Islands (Moyer Bell/Asphodel, 1995)
- Blood Sacrifice (University of the Philippines Press, 1997); 1998 National Book Award for Poetry (Manila Critics Circle, Philippines)
- Songs for the Beginning of the Millennium (De La Salle University Press, 1997); Finalist, 1998 National Book Award for Poetry (Manila Critics Circle, Philippines)
- Turnings: Writing on Women's Transformations, co-edited with Renee Olander (Friends of Women's Studies at Old Dominion University, March 2000)
- Not Home, But Here: Writing from the Filipino Diaspora, as central editor (Anvil, 2003)
- Trill and Mordent (WordTech Editions, fall 2005); Runner-up, 2004 Editions Prize
- Juan Luna's Revolver; 2009 Ernest Sandeen Prize in Poetry
- The Saints of Streets (University of Santo Tomas Publishing House, 2013)
- Night Willow (Phoenicia Publishing, Montreal, 2014)
- Ode to the Heart Smaller than a Pencil Eraser (2014 May Swenson Prize, Utah State University Press)
- Of Color: Poets' Ways of Making (anthology of craft essays by poets of color, co-edited with Amanda Galvan Huynh) (New York: The Operating System, 2018)
- The Buddha Wonders if She is Having a Mid-Life Crisis (Phoenicia Publishing, Montreal, 2018)
- Maps for Migrants and Ghosts (2019 Crab Orchard Poetry Open Competition Co-Winner, Southern Illinois University Press, 2020)
- Caulbearer (Immigrant Series Prize winner, Black Lawrence Press; August 2024)

Chapbooks:

- Bright as Mirrors Left in the Grass (Kudzu House Quarterly, spring 2014)
- Check & Balance (Moria Press/Locofo Chaps, 2017)
- Haori (Tea & Tattered Pages Press, April 2017)
- Puñeta: Political Pilipinx Poetry, vol. 3; ed. Luisa A. Igloria (Chicago: Locofo Chaps, Moria Press, 2017)
- What is Left of Wings, I Ask (2018 Center for the Book Arts Poetry Chapbook Prize, New York, 2018)
