= Roger Olivares =

Filipino author

Rogelio "Roger" P. Olivares is a Filipino author.

A graduate of the Ateneo de Manila University (AB-economics) and the University of Illinois (Fulbright scholar, MS in communications), he has lived in New York City, San Francisco, Guam, Spain, and in the island of Crete in Greece. He now lives in Atlanta, Georgia, and writes about his native country, the Philippines.

He is best known for his novel Noli Me Tangere 2, and for writing the first travel guidebook in the Philippines, Roger's Do-It-Yourself Tours.

== Books ==
- Teresa of Avila
- How Granada Was Won
- Noli Me Tangere 2
- Odyssey in Crete
- Siege of Alcazar
- Con Todo Mi Corazon
