= Sunnies Studios =

Philippine eyewear brand

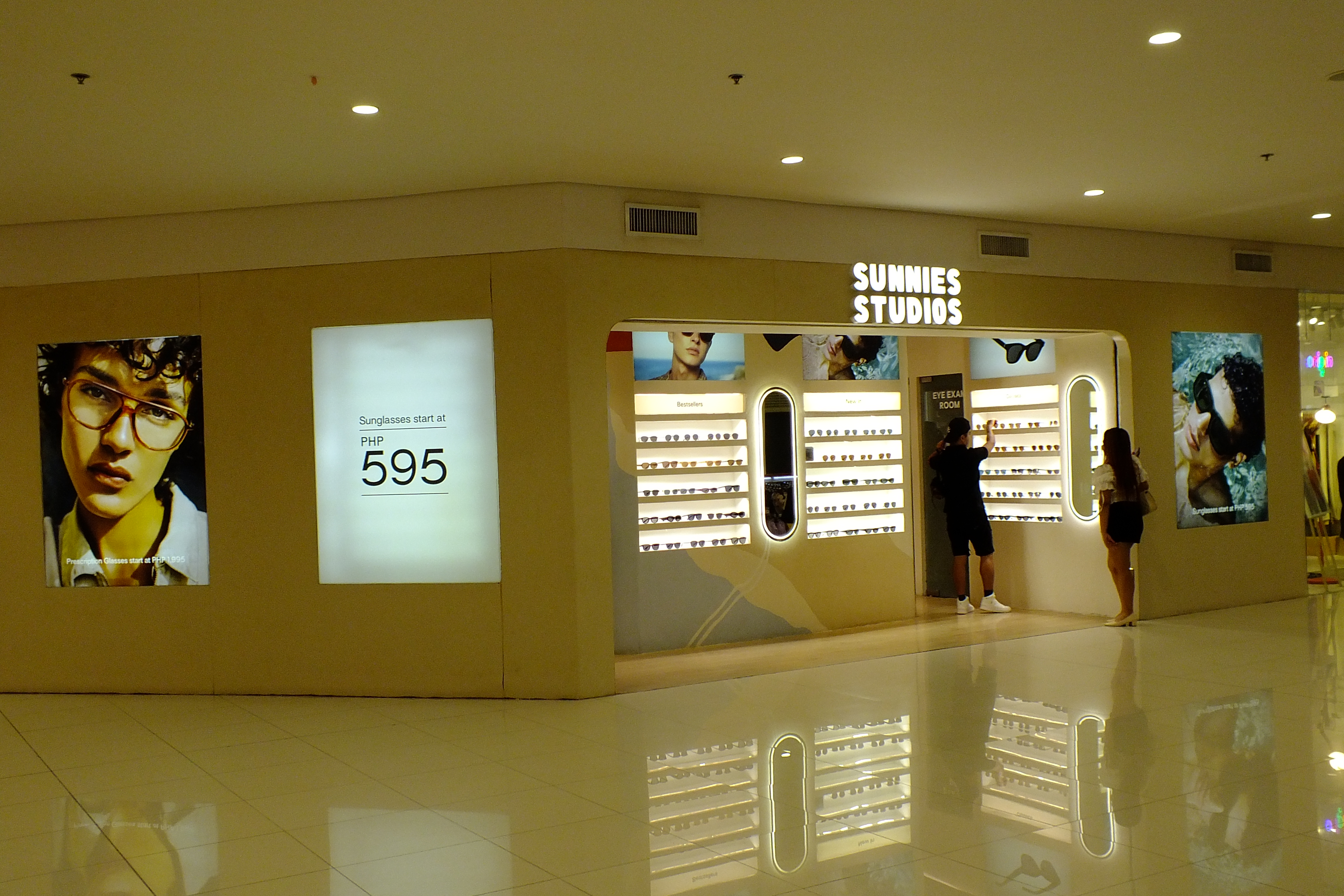
- A Sunnies Studios branch at Ayala Malls Central Bloc, Cebu City
- Type: Private
- Industry: Retail
- Founded: 2013
- Founders: Eric Dee; Bea Soriano Dee; Martine Cajucom; Georgina Wilson; Jessica Wilson (Sunnies Face)
- Headquarters: Mandaluyong, Metro Manila, Philippines
- Number of locations: 127
- Area served: Philippines, Vietnam
- Key people: Eric Dee (finance director); Bea Soriano Dee (operations director); Martine Cajucom (creative director); Georgina Wilson (marketing director); Jessica Wilson (brand manager, Sunnies Face)
- Products: Prescription eyeglasses, sunglasses, make-up
- Website: www.sunniesstudios.com

Sunnies Studios is a Philippine-based lifestyle brand that began as a product line of sunglasses. Founded in 2013, Sunnies Studios has since expanded to offering prescription eyeglasses (Sunnies Specs Optical), and has ventured into the makeup industry (Sunnies Face) and the food industry (Sunnies Café). They maintain 127 stores in the Philippines and Vietnam, as well as an online store that is available Hong Kong, Thailand, Vietnam, Malaysia, Singapore, and Indonesia.

== History ==
In 2011, Eric Dee and Bea Soriano-Dee founded Charlie, a retail brand that sold shoes, bags, and clothes. In 2013, model and host Georgina Wilson joined as a marketing director along with Wilson's cousin, fashion designer Martine Cajucom, as the creative director. They rebranded the company and started selling sunglasses under Sunnies by Charlie. It opened its first branch as a kiosk at Glorietta 2, Makati in October 2013.

In February 2014, the company was renamed to Sunnies Studios and relocated to Libis, Quezon City, Philippines.

In 2016, Sunnies Studios launched a prescription eyewear arm under the name Sunnies Specs Optical. By June, the brand became the third-most followed retail brand on Instagram in the Philippines, having around 240,000 followers.

In March 2019, Sunnies Studios launched its first multi-brand brick and mortar store in SM City Cebu, containing Sunnies Studios, Sunnies Specs Optical, Sunnies Face, and Cup Point within one store.

== Sunglasses and prescription eyewear ==
The brand has designed and carried over 200 styles. They are currently sold in over 120 retail locations around the Philippines. In September 2018, the team opened its second international location for Sunnies Studios in Vietnam, having also operated in Guam for some time.

According to Euromonitor, in 2015, Sunnies Studios was ranked second in the Philippine market for sunglasses behind category leader Luxottica Group SpA. Sunnies Studios had an 8% value share in that sector. It was also ranked 10th in eye wear with a 1% value share in 2015.

In March 2017, Sunnies Studios named the actress Liza Soberano as the brand's first official endorser for Sunnies. Later on in 2018, Sunnies Studios revealed local celebrity James Reid as their celebrity endorser.

== Brand extensions ==
=== Cup Point ===
Cup Point was first launched as part of Sunnies Studios in Cebu. Cup Point was created by Sunnies Specs Optical to support customers' wait time while their prescription eye wear is being processed.

=== Sunnies Face ===
Sunnies Face is a cruelty-free beauty line, launched in August 2018. The brand was launched with Fluffmatte, a range of modern matte lipsticks.They have since expanded their line to include Airblush (soft-focus cheek tint), Lip Dip (whipped matte lip cream), Play Paint (vegan quick-dry nail polish), The Perfector (skin-perfecting duo), Lip Treat (sheer lip glow), Face Glass (liquid luminizer), Life brow Micromarker (liquid brow precision pencil), Eye Crayon (multi-purpose eyeshadow stick), and Dream Cream (gel cream moisturizer).

The brand has six online markets and is present in five countries with 17 physical stores.

=== Sunnies Cafe ===
In 2016, Sunnies Studios ventured into the food industry with the opening of Sunnies Cafe. Sunnies Cafe opened its first store at Bonifacio High Street in Bonifacio Global City, followed by its second store at SM Megamall. A third restaurant opened at Alabang Town Center by January 2017. The menu consists of comfort food with a modern twist and is constantly being updated with new dishes.

=== Sunnies World ===
In September 2019, Sunnies Studios opened their first flagship store, Sunnies World. The 260 m^{2} (2,800 sq ft) space is their largest store, located at SM Mega Fashion Hall of SM Megamall. At the time of its opening, it was the largest Sunnies Studios branch.

=== Sunnies Fun House ===
In September 2023, Sunnies Studios launched its new flagship and biggest store at Glorietta 2, Makati, called Sunnies Fun House. Inspired by architectural structures and paper cutouts, the store also includes a Sunnies Coffee bar and custom mirrors by Filipino-Australian artist Jessica Dorizac for customers to use while they wait.

== Controversies ==
Following the launch of Fluff mate in 2018, netizens noted similarities in aesthetic, branding, and marketing to that of cosmetics company Glossier, founded by American blogger Emily Weiss. Netizens described Sunnies Face as a "copycat" of Glossier. In particular, Sunnies' minimalist packaging style and their marketing strategy of releasing the supply of their products at limited intervals were alleged to have been replicated from Glossier. Creative director Martine Cajucom responded to the issue in a Bustle interview, acknowledging the similarities and calling Glossier to be one of their inspirations for the brand in "changing the skincare conversation".

In November 2020, a hashtag calling for a boycott of the Sunnies brand trended on Philippine social media after a Facebook post that circulated among Filipino netizens disclosed allegations of former Sunnies Studios employees not receiving their separation pay. At least two former employees of a branch in Cauayan, Isabela, that closed down in March due to the COVID-19 pandemic, alleged that they had not received any response from the company since the termination of their employment. However, the publisher of the viral Facebook post later updated it to reveal that the management of Sunnies Studios had settled the issue with the employees.
