= List of Ateneo de Manila University faculty =

The following is a partial list of current and former notable faculty of Ateneo de Manila University (formerly known as the Escuela Municipal de Manila from 1859 to 1865 and the Ateneo Municipal de Manila from 1865 to 1891) in Quezon City, Philippines.

== Faculty ==
- Henedina Abad
- Efren Abueg
- Virgilio S. Almario
- Tomas Andres
- Paulo Miguel Antonio
- Gloria Macapagal Arroyo
- Lamberto V. Avellana
- Adolfo Azcuna
- Cesario Azucena
- Alfredo Bengzon
- Miguel Bernad, S.J.
- Joaquin Bernas, S.J.
- Jaime C. Bulatao
- Sedfrey Candelaria
- Michael M. Coroza
- Vincent de Jesus
- Horacio de la Costa, S.J.
- Assunta Cuyegkeng
- Fabian Dayrit
- Eduardo de los Angeles
- Francis Escudero
- Susan Fernandez
- Mikaela Fudolig
- Joseph Galdon, S.J.
- Louie Mar Gangcuangco
- Menardo Guevarra
- J. Hunter Guthrie
- Cielito Habito
- Ramon Paul Hernando
- Margie Holmes
- Amando Kapauan
- Antonio La Viña
- Bienvenido Lumbera
- James A. Martin, S.J.
- Buenaventura S. Medina Jr.
- Orlando S. Mercado
- John Courtney Murray, S.J.
- Bienvenido Nebres, S.J.
- Ambeth Ocampo
- Onofre R. Pagsanghan
- Francis Pangilinan
- Jericho Petilla
- Lorenzo Relova
- Danton Remoto
- James Reuter, S.J.
- Soledad Reyes
- Mari-Jo P. Ruiz
- Czarina Saloma
- Edgar Calabia Samar
- Karel San Juan, S.J.
- Lucio San Pedro
- Melencio Santa Maria
- Luis Antonio Tagle
- Ross Kendrick Tan
- Nicanor Tiongson
- John Paul Vergara
- Nimfa C. Vilches
- Ben Hur Villanueva
- Cesar L. Villanueva
- Jose Ramon Villarin, S.J.
- George J. Willmann, S.J.
- Lydia Yu-Jose
- Fernando Zóbel de Ayala y Montojo
- Tranquil Salvador III

== University presidents and rectors ==
1. Fr. José Fernández Cuevas, S.J., 1859–1864
2. Fr. Juan Bautista Vidal, S.J., July 30, 1864 – June 10, 1868
3. Fr. Pedro Bertrán, S.J., June 11, 1868 – September 3, 1871
4. Fr. José Lluch, S.J., September 4, 1871 – August 20, 1875
5. Fr. Juan Bautista Heras, S.J., August 21, 1875 – December 31, 1881
6. Fr. Pablo Ramón, S.J., January 1, 1881 – February 5, 1886
7. Fr. Miguel Roses, S.J., February 6, 1886 – February 10, 1894
8. Fr. Miguel Sedarra Mata, S.J., February 11, 1894 – June 8, 1901
9. Fr. José Clos, S.J., June 9, 1901 – December 10, 1905
10. Fr. Joaquín Añon, S.J., December 11, 1905 – October 30, 1910
11. Fr. Joaquín Villalonga, S.J., October 31, 1910 – May 27, 1916
12. Fr. Marcial Sola, S.J., May 28, 1916 – July 28, 1920
13. Fr. Juan Villalonga, S.J., July 29, 1920 – June 14, 1921
14. Fr. Francis X. Byrne, S.J., June 15, 1921 – July 23, 1925
15. Fr. James J. Carlin, S.J., July 24, 1925 – August 10, 1927
16. Fr. Richard A. O'Brien, S.J., August 11, 1927 – July 29, 1933
17. Fr. Henry C. Avery, S.J., July 30, 1933 – February 25, 1937
18. Fr. Carroll I. Fasy, S.J., February 26, 1937 – April 24, 1941
19. Fr. Francis X. Reardon, S.J., April 25, 1941 – 1947
20. Fr. William F. Masterson, S.J., May 14, 1947 – March 14, 1950
21. Fr. James J. McMahon, S.J., March 15, 1950 – June 30, 1956
22. Fr. Leo A. Cullum, S.J., July 31, 1956 – June 14, 1959
23. Fr. Francisco Z. Araneta, S.J., June 15, 1959 – July 1, 1965
24. Fr. James F. Donelan, S.J., July 2, 1965 – April 30, 1969
25. Fr. Pacifico Ortiz, S.J., May 1, 1969 – November 14, 1970
26. Fr. Francisco Z. Araneta, S.J., November 15, 1970 – August 11, 1972
27. Fr. José A. Cruz, S.J., August 12, 1972 – March 31, 1984
28. Fr. Joaquin G. Bernas, S.J., April 1, 1984 – March 31, 1993
29. Fr. Bienvenido Nebres, S.J., April 1, 1993 – May 31, 2011
30. Fr. Jose Ramon Villarin, S.J., June 1, 2011 – July 30, 2020
31. Fr. Roberto C. Yap, S.J., August 1, 2020 – present

== See also ==
- Category:Academic staff of Ateneo de Manila University
- List of Ateneo de Manila University alumni
