= List of Xavier University – Ateneo de Cagayan alumni =

This page comprises the notable alumni of Xavier University – Ateneo de Cagayan. It comprises notable figures who were conferred and graduated from the institution. Among these distinguished figures are archbishops, engineers, a journalist, environmentalist, businesspeople, economist, author, basketball players, senators, politicians, priests, lawyers, public servants, legislators, secretary of presidential communication, chief justice, presidential candidate, vice president, presidential spokesperson, and presidents.

== Alumni ==
- Rufus B. Rodriguez – politician; congressman
- Teofisto T. Guingona Jr. – lawyer; Vice-President of the Philippines (2001–2004)
- Oscar S. Moreno – politician; mayor
- Nereus O. Acosta – political scientist; politician
- Isabelo Lastimosa, Jr. – basketball player
- Nelbert Omolon – basketball player
- Aquilino Q. Pimentel, Jr.– politician; senator
- Tomas R. Osmeña – agriculturist; politician
- Jesus Nicanor P. Perlas III – environmentalist; 2010 elections presidential candidate
- Jose Ruperto Martin M. Andanar – journalist; radio and television host, secretary of Presidential Communications Office and acting presidential spokesperson
- Ronnie Vicente C. Lagnada – civil engineer; 14th Mayor of Butuan (2016–2025)
- Jose C. Alvarez – entrepreneur; representative of 2nd legislative district (2022–present); Governor of Palawan (2013–2022)
- Peter M. Unabia – businessman; Governor of Misamis Oriental (2022–2025)
- Yevgeny Vincente "Bambi" B. Emano - politician; congressman
- Jonahmae P. Pacala (Jonaxx) – author
- Zia Alonto Adiong - politician; congressman
- Arthur Nery - filipino song artist
- TJ Monterde - singer and songwriter

== Honoris causa ==
- Carlos P. Garcia – lawyer; President of the Philippines (1957–1961)
- Justiniano R. Borja – politician
- Rev. Fr. Eduardo P. Hontiveros, S.J. – priest; composer
- Miriam P. Defensor-Santiago – lawyer; politician
- Corazon C. Aquino – President of the Philippines (1986–1992)
- Reynato S. Puno – lawyer; Chief Justice of the Supreme Court of the Philippines (2006–2010)
- Most. Rev. Orlando B. Quevedo, O.M.I., D.D. – Cardinal Archbishop Emeritus of Cotabato (1998–2018)
- Most. Rev. Luis Antonio G. Tagle, D.D., S.Th.D. – Pro-prefect for the Section of First Evangelization; Prefect of the Congregation for the Evangelization of Peoples (2019–2022); Cardinal Archbishop Emeritus of Manila (2011–2019)
- Corazon J. Soliman – social worker; Secretary of Social Welfare and Development (2001–2005; 2010–2016)
- Teresita Quintos-Deles – academic; Presidential Advisor on the Peace Process (2003–2005; 2010–2016)
- Fr. Edwin A. Gariguez – priest; environmentalist
- Diosdado P. Banatao – engineer

== Faculty ==
- Fr. Miguel Anselmo A. Bernad, S.J. – priest; professor of literature
- Most Rev. Antonio J. Ledesma, S.J., D.D. – Archbishop Emeritus of Cagayan de Oro (2006–2020); dean of Agriculture (1984–1994) and of Arts and Sciences (1994–1996)
- Fr. William F. Masterson, S.J. – priest; dean of Agriculture (1953–1984)
- Jose Manuel C. Montalván – war hero; ROTC instructor (1933–1937)
