= Bulatao =

Bulatao is a surname. Notable people with the surname include:

- Brian Bulatao (born 1964), American businessman and government official
- Jaime C. Bulatao (1922–2015), Filipino Jesuit priest and psychologist
