= President of the Ateneo de Manila University =

Chief administrator of the Ateneo de Manila University

- Pangulo ng Pamantasang Ateneo de Manila
- Incumbent; Roberto Yap since August 1, 2020
- Ateneo de Manila University
- Status: Chief Administrator
- Residence: Ateneo Jesuit Residences
- Seat: Quezon City
- Appointer: Board of Trustees of the Ateneo de Manila University
- Term length: No fixed term
- Formation: 1859
- First holder: Jose Fernandez Cuevas
- Website: ateneo.edu/office-president

The president of the Ateneo de Manila University (Filipino: Pangulo ng Pamantasang Ateneo de Manila Spanish: Presidente de Universidad Ateneo de Manila; Latin: Praeside Universitas Athenaea Manilensis) is the chief administrator and principal executive officer of the Ateneo de Manila University. The president is directly chosen by the university's Board of Trustees. Thirty people have held the office, in addition to several others who have held it in either an acting or interim capacity. In all cases where the president of the Ateneo de Manila University is unable to fulfill their duties, an appointed officer in charge (OIC) will become acting president.

Roberto Yap is the 31st and current president of the Ateneo de Manila University. He assumed office on August 1, 2020.

== List of presidents of the Ateneo de Manila University ==
Presidents of the Ateneo de Manila University
Number	Image	Name	Years in office
1		Jose Fernandez Cuevas	1859–1864
2		Juan Bautista Vidal	1864–1868
3		Pedro Bertran	1868–1872
4		Jose Lluch	1872–1875
5		Juan Bautista Heras	1875–1881
6		Pablo Ramon	1881–1886
7		Miguel Roses	1886–1894
8		Miguel Saderra Mata	1894–1901
9		Jose Clos	1901–1905
10		Joaquin Añon	1905–1910
11		Joaquin Villalonga	1910–1916
12		Marcial Sola	1916–1920
13		Juan Villalonga	1920–1921
14		Francis X. Byrne	1921–1925
15		Francis J Carlin	1925–1927
16		Richard A. O'Brien	1927–1933
17		Henry C. Avery	1933–1937
18		Caroll I. Fasy	1937–1941
19		Francis X. Rasdon	1941–1947
20		William F. Masterson	1947–1950
21		James J. McMahon	1950–1956
22		Leo A. Cullum	1956–1959
23		Francisco Araneta	1959–1965
24		James F. Donelan	1965–1969
25		Pacifico A. Ortiz	1969–1970
26		Francisco Araneta	1970–1972
27		Jose A. Cruz	1972–1984
28		Joaquin Bernas	1984–1993
29		Bienvenido Nebres	1993–2011
30		Jose Ramon Villarin	2011–2020
31		Roberto C. Yap	2020–present

== See also ==
- List of colleges and universities in Metro Manila
- List of Jesuit educational institutions in the Philippines
- Ateneo de Manila University
