= Sedfrey Candelaria =

Filipino lawyer

Sidfrey Candelaria

Academic background
- Education: Ateneo de Manila University (AB, LLB); University of British Columbia (LLM)

Academic work
- Discipline: Political Science, Law

Sedfrey M. Candelaria, is the former Dean of the Ateneo Law School in Makati, Philippines.

== Education ==
Candelaria finished elementary and secondary education at Lourdes School of Mandaluyong and holds a Bachelor of Arts in political science from the Ateneo de Manila University. He received his Bachelor of Laws from the Ateneo Law School in 1984. He obtained a Master of Laws from the University of British Columbia in 1986 as a Rotary International Foundation Ambassadorial Scholar. In October 2005, he was conferred a Diplomate in Juridical Science (D.J.S.) by San Beda College.

== Career ==
Candelaria is a member of the faculty of the Ateneo Law School teaching Constitutional Law, Political Law Review, Public International Law, International Economic Law and Indigenous Peoples Law. He was appointed Associate Dean of the Ateneo Law School (with Cynthia Roxas del Castillo as Dean) and was appointed Associate Dean of Student Affairs in 2000 (with Fr. Joaquin Bernas as Dean). Candelaria also teaches at the Ateneo Graduate School of Business and in the Master of Laws Program jointly administered by the Supreme Court Philippine Judicial Academy (PHILJA) and the San Beda College Graduate Program in Law. Before entering the legal profession, he had a respectable stint in Philippine football, consistently starting as a Goalkeeper for the Ateneo de Manila University Blue Eagles during his collegiate education which led to his call-up to the Philippines national football team.

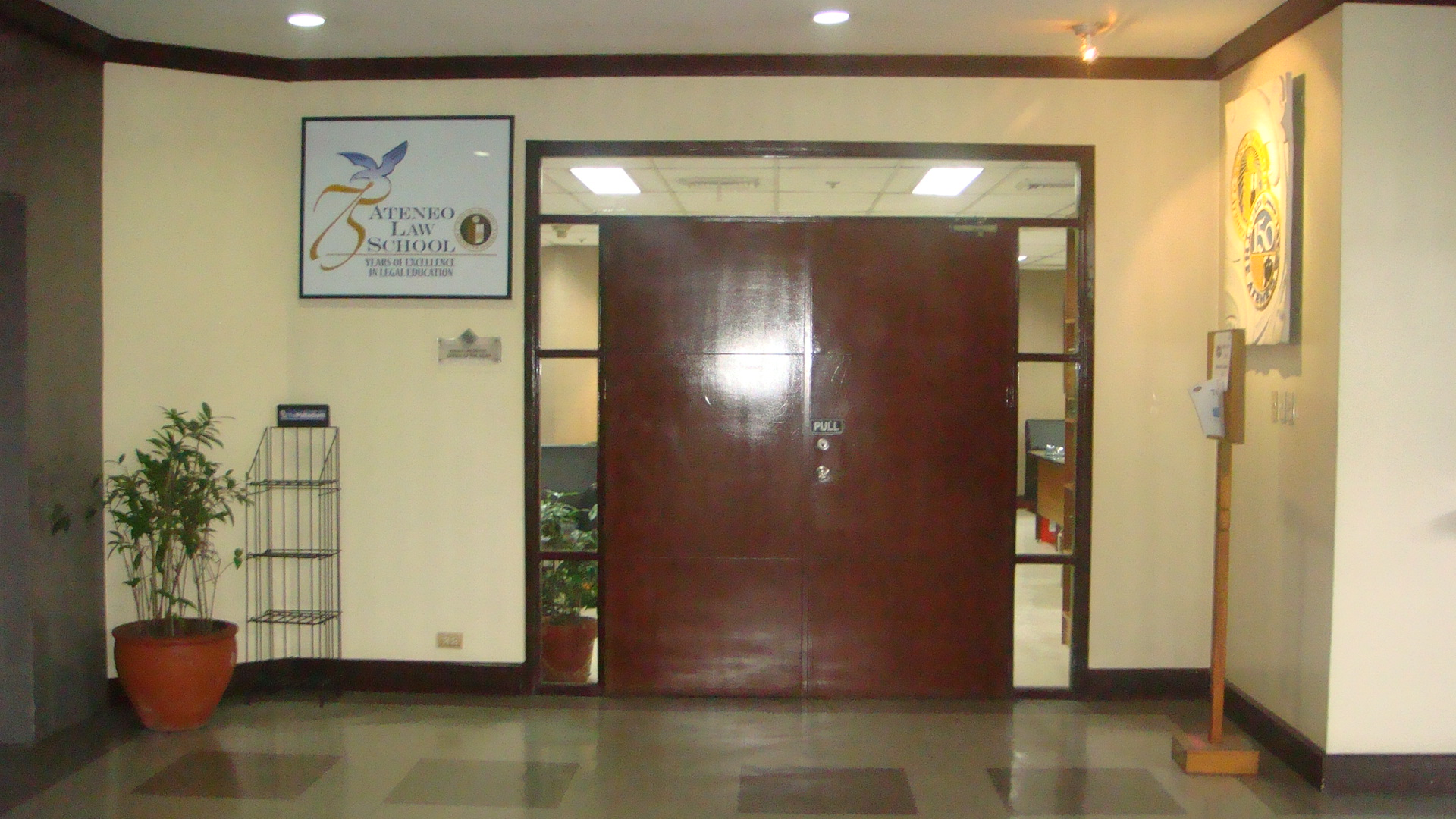
Office of Dean Candelaria

His other posts include counsel to the International Finance Group of the Department of Finance (December 1989 – February 1990), research director of the Ateneo Human Rights Center, directorship of the Adhikain Para sa Karapatang Pambata (AKAP-AHRC) of the Ateneo Human Rights Center, Head of Research and Linkages Office and Chair of the Special Areas of Concern of PHILJA, founder and chair of the legal desk of the Ateneo Human Rights Center (AHRC-KATUTUBO) on indigenous peoples’ concerns and founder and chair of the Court Appointed Special Advocate/Guardian Ad Litem (CASA/GAL) Foundation of the Philippines.

Candelaria was part of the Negotiating Panel for the Peace Talks with the Communist Party of the Philippines, the New People's Army and the National Democratic Front of the Philippines (CPP/NPA/NDF).

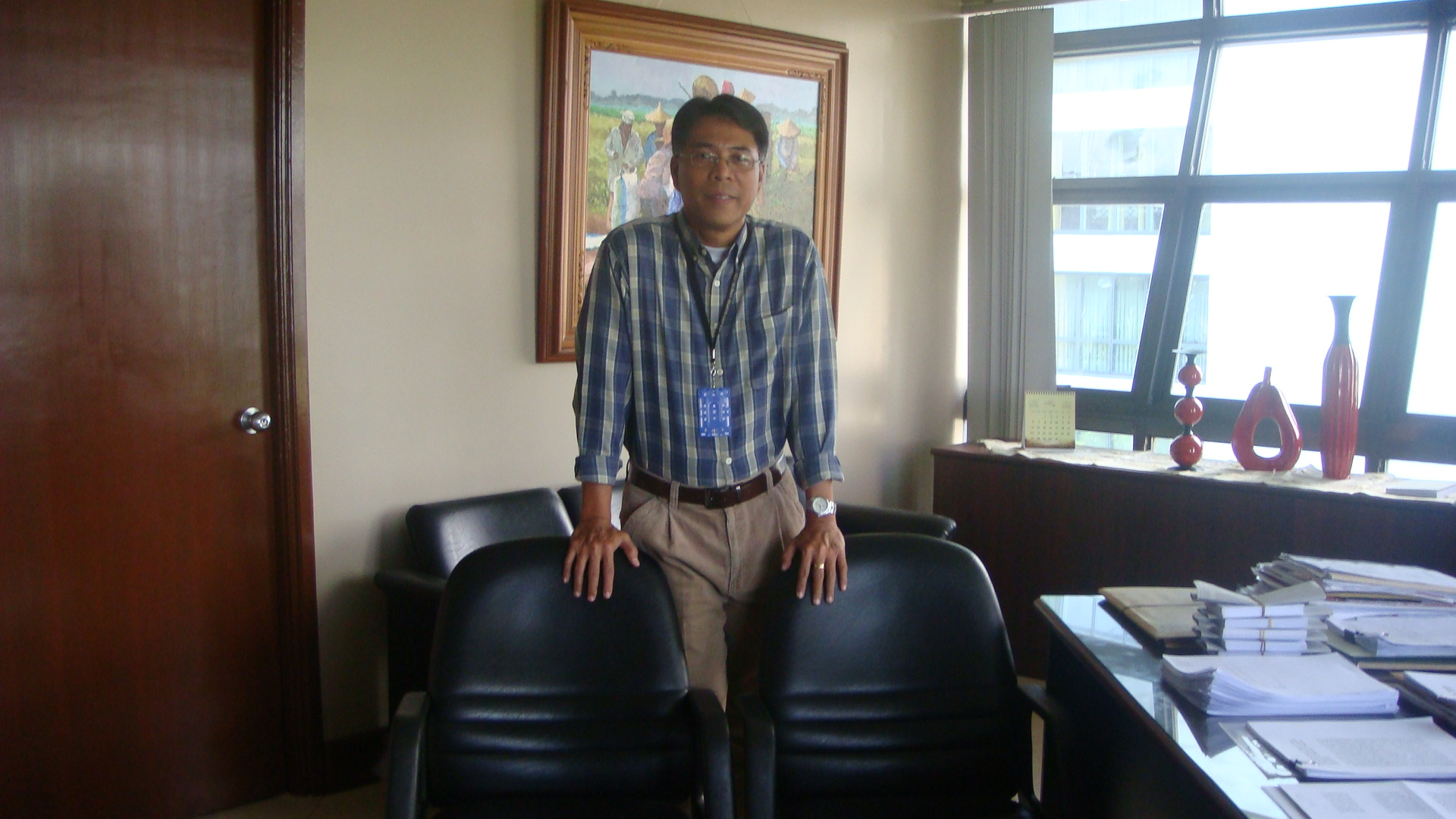
Sedfrey M. Candelaria, A.B., LL.B., LL.M. Dean, inside his Dean's Office

In the occasion when articles of impeachment were filed against Chief Justice of the Philippines, Hilario Davide, Jr., Candelaria, together with other co-petitioners, filed a petition for Certiorari and Prohibition seeking the issuance of a writ "perpetually" prohibiting respondent House of Representatives from filing any Articles of Impeachment against the chief justice with the Senate; and for the issuance of a writ "perpetually" prohibiting respondents Senate and Senate President Franklin Drilon from accepting any Articles of Impeachment against the chief justice. The Supreme Court ruled, in Francisco v. House of Representatives, G.R. No. 160261, November 10, 2003 that the impeachment complaint against the chief justice is barred under paragraph 5, section 3 of Article XI of the Constitution.

Most recently, Candelaria acted as the chief legal consultant of the GRP peace panel for talks with the Moro Islamic Liberation Front. The provisions of the draft memorandum of agreement on the ancestral domain (MOA-AD) was sought to be disclosed in a petition filed before the Supreme Court. Candelaria argued for the GRP panel and affirmed that the MOA-AD would have required a “drastic change” in the Constitution, had it been signed, including, among others, Article I on National Territory and Article 10 on the Autonomous Region in Muslim Mindanao of the Constitution.

== Publications ==
Candelaria has authored and edited various books and articles in constitutional law, human rights law and international economic law, some of which are as follows:

- “Testing Constitutional Waters: Balancing State Power, Economic Development and Human Rights.” Ateneo Law Journal 51 (2006): 1.
- “Courts and Social Context Theory: Philippine Judicial Reform as Applied to Vulnerable Sectors.” Ateneo Law Journal 50 (2006): 823.
- Ed. Situation Analysis of Indigenous Peoples in Detention: A Baseline Study. Makati: Ateneo Human Rights Center, 2006.
- "The Rights of Indigenous Communities in International Law: Some Implications under Philippine Municipal Law." Ateneo Law Journal 46 (September 2001) : 273-317.
- "The Legal Characterization of APEC and the Individual Action Plans in International Law," in Coalition-Building and APEC by Wilfrido V. Villacorta, ed. Makati: Philippine APEC Study Center Network, Philippine Institute for Development Studies and the Yuchengco Center for East Asia, 2001.
- Ed. Situation Analysis on Children in Conflict with the Law and the Juvenile Justice System. Manila: UNICEF, 1998.
- Ed. The United Nations Convention on the Riqhts of the Child and the Philippine Leqal System. Manila: Ateneo Human Rights Center, 1997
- "An Overview of the Inter-Country Adoption Act of (R.A. 8043)." Seminar on Inter-Country Adoption. University of the Philippines Law Center Institute of Judicial Administration, Quezon City, April 1996.
- "International and Local Laws Relating to Children in Situations of Armed Conflict" Paper read before the National Consultative Conference on Children in Situations of Armed Conflict. Zamboanga City, Philippines, October, 1995.
- "Refugees and Human Rights." RSPI Newsletter 1:3 (October–December 1995): 6-9.
- "Significant Features of Inter Country-Adoption Act of 1995 (RA. 8043) and Draft Implementing Rules and Regulations." Third Philippine Global Consultation on Child Welfare Services. Manila, September, 1995.
- "Role of Human Rights NGOs." African Human Riqhts Camp. Eastern Cape, South Africa: Human Rights Institute of South Africa, October, 1995.
- "Regional System of Human Rights Protection for Asia: Problems, Challenges, and Prospects." African Human Riqhts Camp. Eastern Cape, South Africa: Human Rights Institute of South Africa, October, 1995.
- "ASEAN REPORT." Regional Seminar on Democracy. Human Riqhts and the Media: The ASEAN Scenario." Kuala Lumpur: Asian Institute for Development Communication, September, 1995.
- "The Alien Social Integration Act (RA. 7919): Is this Discriminatory of Refugees?" RSPI Newsletter 1:2 (April–September 1995):12.
- "Non-IndoChinese Refugees in the Philippines: Some Legal and Policy Considerations in Seeking Durable Solutions." RSPI Newsletter 1:2 (April–September 1995): 6-8.
- "An Analysis of the Philippine Government's Obligations Under the 1951 Convention Relating to the Status of Refugee." Proceedinqs of the National Conference on Refuqee Issues and Prospects: The Philippine Experience. pp. 31–41. Manila: Refugee Services Philippines, 1995.
- "Judicial Reform," Development and Democracy: A People's Aqenda, pp. 227–235. Edited by Reuel R Hermoso. Quezon City: Ateneo de Manila University Press, 1994.
- "International Responsibility of the IMF: Human Rights Standards and Stand-By Arrangements." Asian Exchanqe 7 (March 1992): 87-108. Reprinted in Ateneo Human Riqhts Law Journal 1 (December 1992): 113-140.
- "The IMF and the Philippines: Anatomy of a Third World Debt." Ateneo Law Journal 36 (June 1992): 18-112.
- "Response to Speeches of Josef Voyanne, Eduardo Umana and Kevin McGrath," in Manila '91 International Symposium on Democracy, Development and Human Riqhts Organized by World Organization Against Torture, 84-86.
- "Silencing Peace: The Story of the Memorandum of Agreement on Ancestral Domain", ABS-CBN News Online, Views and Analysis, 9/5/2008 6:08 PM.

== Private life ==
Candelaria was born in Manila on July 19, 1958. He is married with two children.
