= Philippine Studies (journal) =

- Discipline: History of the Philippines, ethnography, Philippine studies
- Language: English
- Edited by: Michael D. Pante

Publication details
- History: 1953–present
- Publisher: Ateneo de Manila University (Philippines)
- Frequency: Quarterly

Standard abbreviations
- ISO 4: Philipp. Stud.

Indexing
- ISSN: 2244-1093 (print); 2244-1638 (web)
- LCCN: 2012240074
- JSTOR: 22441093
- OCLC no.: 813960150

Links
- Journal homepage; Online access; Online archive; Journal page at university's website

Philippine Studies: Historical and Ethnographic Viewpoints is a quarterly peer-reviewed academic journal covering research on the history and ethnography of the Philippines and its peoples. It is published by the Ateneo de Manila University and was established by Leo A. Cullum in 1953 as Philippine Studies, obtaining its subtitle in 2012. The editor-in-chief is Michael D. Pante. Issues can be accessed via its website, the university's journals portal, and other online databases such as JSTOR and Project MUSE.

In 2007, a redesign of the journal was commissioned "to make the journal more appealing to a younger generation of scholars and academics." All covers were blue and gray prior to the redesign. The new look features a distinctive cover color that varies per issue and a new layout that is "more sensitive to the inclusion of graphics."

== List of editors-in-chief ==
- Leo A. Cullum (1953–1956)
- Miguel A. Bernad (1956–1959)
- Horacio de la Costa (1959–1964)
- Pacifico A. Ortiz (1965–1967)
- Antonio V. Romuáldez (1967–1971)
- José S. Arcilla (Acting, 1971)
- Roque J. Ferriols (1972–1975)
- John N. Schumacher (1975–1978)
- Joseph L. Roche (1978–1984)
- Joseph A. Galdon (1984–2002)
- Antonette P. Angeles (Acting, 2000)
- Doreen G. Fernandez (2002)
- Filomeno V. Aguilar Jr. (2003–2021)
- Michael D. Pante (2021-present)
