= Cesar L. Villanueva =

Cesar L. Villanueva was the former dean of the Ateneo Law School in Makati, Philippines. He is a certified public accountant and specializes in Philippine commercial law. Villanueva was nominated for the position of Chief Justice of the Supreme Court of the Philippines.

== Education ==
Villanueva holds a Bachelor of Science in commerce, major in accountancy, from Holy Angel University in Pampanga, Philippines. He took the Bachelor of Laws and graduated from Ateneo Law School in 1983. He obtained a Master of Laws from Harvard Law School in 1989. In October 2005, he was conferred a Diplomate in Juridical Science (D.J.S.) by San Beda College.

Villanueva graduated cum laude and valedictorian of his law class at the Ateneo, and placed second in the Philippine Bar Examinations of 1981. He graduated magna cum laude from Holy Angel University. He took the Philippine CPA Board Examinations in 1982 and ranked sixth nationwide.

== Career ==
Villanueva has been a member of the faculty of the Ateneo Law School since 1983 and was the associate dean for academic affairs from 2000 to 2004. He was appointed dean of the Ateneo Law School in 2004, succeeding Fr. Joaquin G. Bernas, S.J.

Villanueva is a co-founder and senior partner of Villanueva Gabionza and De Santos, a private law firm in Makati, Philippines. He has acted as legal consultant of the Export Processing Zone Authority (1985–86), and a member of the Philippine Bar Association and the Integrated Bar of the Philippines; he was also President, Rotary Club of Makati Ayala. He is an honorary member in the Association of Fellow and Legal Scholars of the Center for International Legal Studies.

== Publications ==
Villanueva was editor-in-chief of the Ateneo Law Journal from 1980 to 1981. He authored several books and articles on Philippine commercial law:

- Law on Sales. Rex Bookstore, Inc. 2004.
- Corporation Law. Rex Bookstore, Inc. 2004.
- Commercial Law Reviewer. Rex Bookstore, Inc. 2002.
- Handbook on the Corporate Jurisdictions of the RTC and the SEC. Philippine Judicial Academy (PHILJA), in partnership with USAID and The Asia Foundation.
- "The Evolution of the Philippine Commercial Law System." 50 Ateneo Law Journal 690 (2005).
- "Defining the Gravamen: The Bar Reform Movement" 48 Ateneo Law Journal 624 (2004).
- "Revisiting the Philosophical Underpinnings of Philippine Commercial Laws." 46 Ateneo Law Journal 707 (2001).
- "Revisiting the Philippine Laws on Corporate Rehabilitation." 43 Ateneo Law Journal 183 (1999).
- "The Law on Contratos Inominados." 42 Ateneo Law Journal 242 (1998).
- Corporate Contract Law: Unifying Theme on Theories Relating to Promoter's Contracts, De Facto Corporations, Corporations by Estoppel, Articles of Incorporation, By-Laws, and Ultra Vires Acts." 38 Ateneo Law Journal 1 (1994).
- Restatement of the Doctrine of Piercing the Veil of Corporate Fiction." 37 Ateneo Law Journal19 (1993).
- The Fiduciary Duties of Directors and Officers Representing the Creditor Pursuant to a Loan Workout Arrangement: Parameters under Philippine Corporate Setting." 35 Ateneo Law Journal11 (1991).
- Comparative Study of the Judicial Role and its effect on the Theory on Judicial Precedents in the Philippine Hybrid Legal System, 65 Phil. Law Journal, (Nos. 1 & 2, March–June, 1990).
- The Philippine Close Corporation, XXXII Ateneo Law Journal, (No. 2, March, 1988).
- The Trust Fund Doctrine Under Philippine Corporate Setting, XXXI Ateneo Law Journal. (No. 1, February, 1987).
- Non-Punishable: Issuance of a Check as a Guarantee for Payment of an Obligation, XXIX Ateneo Law Journal. (No. 1 October 1984).
- Tax Inquiries, Surveillance, Warrantless Searches and Seizures: Their Constitutional Limitations, XXV Ateneo Law Journal. (No. 3, March, 1981)
- Ecclesiastics in Politics: The Teleron v. Pamil Case, XXV Ateneo Law Journal. (Vol. XXV, No. 2, October, 1980, co-author).
- The Conscientious Objector Under the New Labor Code, XXV Ateneo Law Journal. (No. 1, March, 1989).
