= Jaime C. Bulatao =

Filipino Jesuit priest and psychologist

- Born: September 22, 1922; Paco, Manila
- Died: February 10, 2015 (aged 92)
- Occupations: Jesuit Priest, Psychologist, Professor
- Parent(s): Dr. Emilio Bulatao and Encarnacion Ungson

Fr. Jaime C. Bulatao, SJ, affectionately known as "Fr. Bu" to his friends, colleagues, and students, was a Filipino Jesuit priest and psychologist who founded the Ateneo de Manila University's Department of Psychology in 1960. The same department is now designated as a Center of Excellence by the Philippines Commission on Higher Education (CHED).

He earned a degree in theology from Woodstock College in New York, then later earned an MA in Experimental Psychology and a PhD in Clinical Psychology from Fordham University.

Bulatao was known for his innovative use of hypnosis in therapy and his exploration of Filipino animistic beliefs within a psychological context. His works include Technique of Group Discussion (1965), Phenomena and Their Interpretation: Landmark Essays 1957-1989 (1992), and Hypnosis and Hypnotherapy (2000).

== Biography ==
=== Early life ===
Fr. Jaime C. Bulatao, SJ was born on September 22, 1922, in Paco, Manila. His father, Dr. Emilio Bulatao, headed the Physiology Department at the University of the Philippines College of Medicine. His mother, Encarnacion Ungson, taught in the public school system before her marriage.

=== Education ===
Bulatao attended St. Theresa's College, Manila, under Mother Redempta. He continued to attend Jesuit schools for the rest of his academic life. He excelled academically, becoming the valedictorian of his 1939 high school class at the Ateneo de Manila, then located on Padre Faura Street in Ermita, Manila.

At sixteen, he joined the Jesuit novitiate in Novaliches as a college freshman. He earned his theology degree from Woodstock College in New York, followed by an MA in Experimental Psychology and a PhD in Clinical Psychology from Fordham University. Upon his return to the Philippines, he was appointed head of Central Guidance Office of the Ateneo de Manila University. He established the Ateneo Department of Psychology in 1960.

=== Teaching ===
Fr. Bulatao began teaching in 1946 at the Ateneo before leaving to pursue his postgraduate studies at Fordham University. He returned to the Philippines and established the Ateneo de Manila's Department of Psychology in 1960, where he taught for almost five decades. He also helped found the Psychological Association of the Philippines in 1962. Two years later, he co-founded the Philippine Guidance and Personnel Association along with colleagues from various local universities.

Fr. Bulatao was known for his hypnosis and hypnotherapy classes at the Ateneo de Manila University. His distinctive method, outlined in Hypnosis and Hypnotherapy (2000) and earlier elaborated through his foundational work in Phenomena and Their Interpretation: Landmark Essays, 1957-1989 (1992) merges conventional hypnotherapy techniques with the cultural and spiritual nuances of the Filipino society.

The Fr. Bulatao approach perceives hypnosis as an altered state of consciousness (ASC) and echoes Freud's theory that dreams and symbolic language are pivotal in accessing and influencing the unconscious mind. In the Fr. Bulatao style, narratives and metaphors become the tools for engaging and transforming the unconscious, creating a deeply resonant and culturally-attuned therapeutic process.

John Wesley Y. Bayot, a student of Fr. Bulatao, summarized the key elements of the Bulatao style of hypnosis and hypnotherapy to include:

- Cultural Integration: Fr. Bulatao incorporates Filipino animistic beliefs and spirituality into his hypnotherapy practice, recognizing and leveraging these elements to enhance therapeutic efficacy.
- Symbolic Communication: Fr. Bulatao emphasizes the use of symbols, metaphors, hyperboles, and imagery in hypnosis, drawing parallels with dream interpretation, to facilitate a deeper engagement with the unconscious mind.
- Utilization Principle: Following Milton H. Erickson's principle of utilization, Fr. Bulatao respects and utilizes the client's cultural beliefs and narratives rather than challenging them, which fosters a more effective and respectful therapeutic environment.
- Transformation and Influence: By mastering the ability to induce altered states of consciousness (ASC) and communicating in the language of the unconscious, this approach aims to influence the unconscious mind, promoting significant and lasting change.

Overall, the Fr. Bulatao style of hypnosis is a culturally-sensitive approach that respects and integrates the cultural backdrop of the client into the therapeutic process, making it a distinct and effective form of hypnotherapy, particularly for Filipino clients.

In a memo after Bulatao's death, the Psychology Department stated that although Bulatao received many awards for his contribution to psychology, he believed that his greatest achievement was teaching.

=== Later life and death ===
Father Bulatao died at the Ateneo's Jesuit Residence on the evening of February 10, 2015, following a brief hospitalization lasting four days. The specifics surrounding the cause of his passing were not disclosed by the University. He was 92.

A solemn funeral Mass was held in his honor at the Church of Gesù at the Ateneo de Manila University, on February 11. Ateneo President Jose Ramon Villarin in his homily described Bulatao as "a seer—a seer of minds and hearts". He said: Pray for us, please, to see what you saw, to be fascinated by the unknown, to be unafraid, to be driven to explore the unexplored frontier, to have the courage to risk our lives in commitment even if we do not see everything appearing... Pray for us to be crazy, to be crazy enough to stand on our heads, to be able to imagine what life can be, who God is, who we can become, be who God dreams us to be.

Fr. Bulatao's remains were interred at the Sacred Heart Novitiate Cemetery in Novaliches, Quezon City on February 14, 2015.

== Awards and honors ==
Bulatao received several awards for his work, among others:

- Achievement Awardee of the Philippine National Science Society (1987)
- National Social Scientist Awardee of the Philippine Social Science Council (1990).
- Gawad ng Pagkilala by the Pambansang Samahan ng Sikolohiyang Pilipino (1990)
- National Book Awardee for the Social Sciences by the Manila Critics Circle (1992)
- President Emeritus Award from the Philippine Guidance and Counseling Association (2006)
- Quezon City's Most Outstanding Citizen (2008)

== Published books ==
Technique of Group Discussion.

Phenomena and Their Interpretation: Landmark Essays, 1957-1989

Hypnosis and Hypnotherapy

Therapeutic Tales: Healing, Hypnotherapy and Father Bu.

Consciousness Mapping: Exploring Your Relationships through the Star Matrix.

Fr. Bu, Seer of Minds and Hearts: The Legacy of Fr. Jaime C. Bulatao, SJ

== Controversy ==
Fr. Bulatao's method deeply considered and incorporated the cultural and spiritual milieu of the Philippines, where elements like animism, magic, and the supernatural play significant roles in daily life. By integrating these elements into his therapeutic practices, he tapped into the deeply ingrained beliefs and narratives of his Filipino clients, creating a more resonant and effective form of therapy. However, this approach, while innovative and respectful of cultural nuances, often led to oversimplifications and misinterpretations by those unfamiliar with the depth of his work.

Without a proper understanding of the theoretical underpinnings and the cultural sensitivity driving Fr. Bulatao's methods, some observers have mistakenly viewed his practices as mere superstitions or eccentricities. The reduction of his nuanced therapeutic approach to simple anecdotes—such as clients interacting with duendes, using crystal balls, or employing dowsing rods—can seem whimsical or irrational without the proper context. These elements, while seemingly outlandish to the uninitiated, were part of a deeply-informed and sophisticated strategy to engage clients within their cultural and spiritual frameworks, thereby enhancing the therapeutic alliance and the efficacy of the treatment.

While Fr. Bulatao incorporated cultural beliefs into his therapeutic approach, this did not mean he blindly accepted all cultural practices outside the context of therapy. His integration of cultural elements was strategic and contextualized, not a wholesale endorsement of cultural traditions. He remained firmly committed to scientific principles.

In his 1992 interview with Mayen Wijangco for the book Phenomena and Their Interpretation, Fr. Bulatao emphasized the importance of critically examining and verifying phenomena found in Philippine popular culture, like the works of Jaime T. Licauco, Tony Perez and the Spirit Questors, and similar sources. He cautioned against simply accepting such material at face value. Fr. Bulatao believed that a deeper understanding of the nature and workings of the altered states of consciousness (ASC), coupled with the scientific method, was crucial for responsible exploration of these topics.

In their interviews for the three-part 'Knowing Fr. Bu' docuseries produced by the Ateneo de Manila University, Nebres and Bayot clarified that Fr. Bulatao's approach was not about his endorsing supernatural or occult-like elements but about recognizing and utilizing the significant impact these beliefs had on his clients' psyches. By meeting his clients 'where they were,' in terms of their beliefs and worldviews, Fr. Bulatao fostered a deeper level of trust and openness, crucial for effective therapy.

Former Ateneo President Fr. Ben Nebres recounts an incident where a girl, believed by her family to be possessed by the Santo Niño, was brought to the Jesuit Residence one night. He was struck by how Fr. Bulatao engaged with the girl within her own belief system, speaking to the Santo Niño and asking it to leave, which resulted in the girl snapping out of her state. Fr. Nebres highlighted how Bulatao accepted the girl's (and the girl's family's) worldview and interacted with her within it, rather than dismissing it as schizophrenia, dissociation, or hysteria. To Nebres, this was the embodiment of cura personalis, a core principle of Jesuit philosophy.

John Wesley Y. Bayot, a protégé of Fr. Bulatao in his interview for the book Fr. Bu, Seer of Minds and Hearts (2024) wrote: "The sophistication and efficacy of Father Bulatao's approach stems from his strategic use of cultural symbols and animistic beliefs that resonated deeply with his patients. Without grasping that cultural context, it's all too easy to reduce his work to simplistic caricatures that miss its true essence."

== Legacy ==
The Psychological Association of the Philippines (PAP) has honored Fr. Bulatao by naming a teaching award after him. In tribute to the founder of Ateneo Psychology, the Ateneo de Manila University has also renamed The Ateneo Psychological Services Center to The Ateneo Bulatao Center for Psychological Services in 2015.

In 2022, Dr. Maria Lourdes Rosita A. Mesa, the Director for Research at the Ateneo Bulatao Center for Psychological Services, led the Knowing Fr. Bu Project. This endeavor captured the narratives of his students, mentees, colleagues, and lifelong friends, unveiling the profound essence and extraordinary journey of Fr. Bulatao's life. The series, skillfully directed and written by Pauline Mangilog-Saltarin, was compiled into a three-part docuseries: Fr. Bu: Teacher, Fr. Bu: Father of Philippine Psychology, and Fr. Bu: Seer of Minds and Hearts. The series premiered on what would have been Fr. Bulatao's 100th birthday on September 22, 2022.

Following the success of the docuseries, Ateneo de Manila University and De La Salle University collaborated to adapt this visual tribute into a commemorative book. By 2024, this collaboration culminated in the publication of Fr. Bu, Seer of Minds and Hearts: The Legacy of Fr. Jaime C. Bulatao, SJ in celebration of Fr. Bulatao's centennial birthday. Edited by Mira Alexis P. Ofreneo, Maria Lourdes Rosita A. Mesa, Gilda Dans-Lopez, and Susan L. Cellano, this book includes insightful conversations with 15 individuals who were meticulously chosen by the Fr. Bu Centennial Committee formed by the Ateneo Psychology Department. The interviewees, who share a profound connection with Fr. Bulatao as educators, students, mentees, and friends, offer valuable insights into his life and influence.

The book offers a collection of stories and insights from a notable ensemble, weaving a tapestry of multiple experiences. Among the featured contributors are Fr. Bienvenido F. Nebres, SJ, a distinguished scientist and former president of Ateneo de Manila University; Dr. Ma Lourdes A. Carandang, a renowned psychologist; and Dr. Patricia B. Licuanan, a prominent figure in academia and higher education leadership. It also highlights the role of Fr. Bulatao's teaching assistants Dr. Maria Lourdes Llaneza-Ramos, Margarita (Gari) A. Ramos, and Dr. Gilda Dans-Lopez and his long-standing assistant of 30 years, Susan Cellano. The book unveils multiple narratives, including Bernie Nepomuceno's discovery of her extraordinary talents during an 'altered state of consciousness' experience in Fr. Bulatao's class. It also features the story of John Wesley Y. Bayot, a protégé and now senior executive at Google, who shares his experience with Fr. Bulatao, discovering the power of the unconscious mind.
