= Assunta Cuyegkeng =

Ma. Assunta Caoile-Cuyegkeng

2nd Vice-President for the Loyola Schools of the Ateneo de Manila University
- In office 2005 – April 2010
- Preceded by: Anna Miren Gonzales-Intal, Ph.D.
- Succeeded by: John Paul Vergara, Ph.D.

Personal details
- Education: Ateneo de Manila University; Universität Regensburg
- Profession: Chemist; Professor

Ma. Assunta Caoile-Cuyegkeng is a Professor of Chemistry at the Department of Chemistry, School of Science and Engineering, Ateneo de Manila University. She was former Vice President for the Loyola Schools of the university. In 2006, she succeeded Professor Anna Miren Gonzales-Intal of the Department of Psychology to become the second person to hold the highest position in the Loyola Schools. She also served as the Acting Dean of the then School of Arts and Sciences and the School of Science and Engineering. In September 2009, she decided to step down from her position as the Loyola Schools Vice President. She was succeeded by John Paul Vergara, Ph.D. She also finished her M.S. Chemistry from the same university. She holds the degree Dr.rer.nat. (summa cum laude), which is equivalent to Ph.D., from Universität Regensburg (University of Regensburg) in Regensburg, Bavaria, Germany.

She is a multi-awarded teacher and researcher. Some of the awards include: Meritorious Service Award, DOST-PCASTRD, 1997; Metrobank Search for Outstanding Teachers, 1997; Dr. Juan Salcedo Jr., Science Education Award, 1997; ASPAC Outstanding Junior Teacher, 1993.

She is a member of the editorial boards of chemistry journals Kimika and The Chemical Education Journal (CEJ). She served as the editor of the Loyola Schools Review: School of Science and Engineering. Her research interests are biopolymers and chemical education. Currently she served Independent Director for Maynilad Water Services.
