= John N. Schumacher =

Filipino-American Jesuit priest and historian (1927–2014)

John "Jack" Norbert Schumacher, SJ (June 17, 1927 – May 14, 2014) was an American-born Filipino Jesuit, historian, and educator known for his work exploring the Catholic clergy's role in the 1896 Philippine revolution in Revolutionary Clergy: The Filipino Clergy and the Nationalist Movement, 1850–1903, first published in 1981.

Schumacher was born in Buffalo, New York. He became a naturalized Filipino citizen in 1977.

His body of work includes The Propaganda Movement, 1880–1895: The Creation of a Filipino Consciousness, the Making of the Revolution (1973); Making of a Nation: Essays on Nineteenth-Century Nationalism (1991); Father Jose Burgos: A Documentary History (1999); and Growth and Decline: Essays on Philippine Church History (2009).

Schumacher served as editor-in-chief of the Philippine Studies journal, published by the Jesuit-run Ateneo de Manila University, from 1975 to 1978.
