= James A. Martin =

American priest

James Aloysius Martin SJ (August 30, 1902 – October 1, 2007) was an American Jesuit priest, professor and athletic director. Martin was the world's oldest Jesuit priest at the time of his death at the age of 105 at the Georgetown University Jesuit Residence in Washington, DC

== Early life ==
James A. Martin was born on August 30, 1902, in Wilkes-Barre, Pennsylvania. His father worked as a musical director at the family's local Roman Catholic church. All three of Martin's sisters eventually became Catholic nuns.

Martin was described as an accomplished youth athlete and was offered several college athletic scholarships. He was also offered the chance to play baseball on the professional level. However, Martin chose instead to study to become a Catholic priest in the Society of Jesus religious order, which is more commonly called the Jesuits. Martin began his studies to become a priest in the early 1920s. He initially entered a seminary in Yonkers, New York, before transferring later to another seminary in West Stockbridge, Massachusetts.

Martin received a Master's degree in theology from Weston College, which is now called the Boston College School of Theology and Ministry, in 1926. However, he did not receive his bachelor's degree from Weston College until 1927, a year after earning his master's.

=== In the Philippines ===
From 1928 to 1931, Martin taught English, Latin and Greek at the Ateneo de Manila High School, a Jesuit-run school in Manila, the Philippines. He is credited with introducing modern basketball to the Philippines, and coaching the Ateneo Blue Eagles basketball team to two NCAA championships, an accomplishment he spoke of fondly until near the end of his life. Among the players Martin coached on the Ateneo Blue Eagles was the future Senator Ambrosio Padilla. He also coached the Ateneo de Manila High School's baseball team.

He returned to the United States in 1931 to study theology at Woodstock College in Maryland from 1931 until 1934.

== Jesuits ==
James A. Martin was officially ordained a Jesuit priest in 1934. In 1939, Martin was appointed the assistant athletic director and assistant dean of men at Georgetown University in Washington, DC. He left Georgetown after one year to take the position of athletic director at St. Joseph's College, now called St. Joseph's University, in Philadelphia for two years.

Martin left St. Joseph's College after two years to serve as a chaplain for the United States Army Air Forces during World War II. He served with the Army Air Forces in Italy, North Africa and France. He remained in Europe after World War II to help raise money to rebuild damaged or destroyed Jesuit schools and churches.

Martin returned to the United States in 1946. He worked as the chairman of the Department of Theology at the University of Scranton from 1946 until 1949. He simultaneously worked as a University of Scranton student counselor during this same time.

He moved to back Washington in 1949 where he became a religion teacher and guidance counselor at Gonzaga College High School. Martin led spiritual retreat programs and meetings at churches around the Washington metropolitan area as part of a Jesuit "mission band" during the early 1950s.

Martin became the founding director of the Loyola Retreat House, which overlooks the Potomac River in Charles County, Maryland, from 1955 to 1964. He oversaw the planning and building of the retreat house, which sits on 235 acres (0.95 km^{2}) of land. He spent much of the rest of his priesthood conducting Jesuit led spiritual retreats and outreach programs.

Martin lived at the Jesuit residence on the campus of Georgetown University from 1974 until his death in 2007. He worked as the director of the Roman Catholic Archdiocese of Washington's Apostleship of Prayer, which encourages daily prayer, from 1975 until 1983. He also worked as a consultant for the Christian Family Movement.

His last official assignment was as at St. Mary's Catholic Church in Alexandria, Virginia, as a pastoral assistant in 1983. Martin retired in 1989.

Martin, along with 41 other centenarians, were honored in 2006 at the city of Washington's annual celebration of residents over the age of 100.

== Death ==
James A. Martin died of pneumonia at the Jesuit Residence at Georgetown University on October 1, 2007. He was 105 years old.

Just two weeks before Martin's death, he was visited by Ateneo de Manila University president Bienvenido Nebres, who gave him a jacket of the Ateneo basketball team that he had coached some 70 years earlier. Martin was said to have worn the jacket to the evening community Mass.
