= Pacifico Ortiz =

Filipino Jesuit priest (1913–1983)

Pacifico A. Ortiz SJ
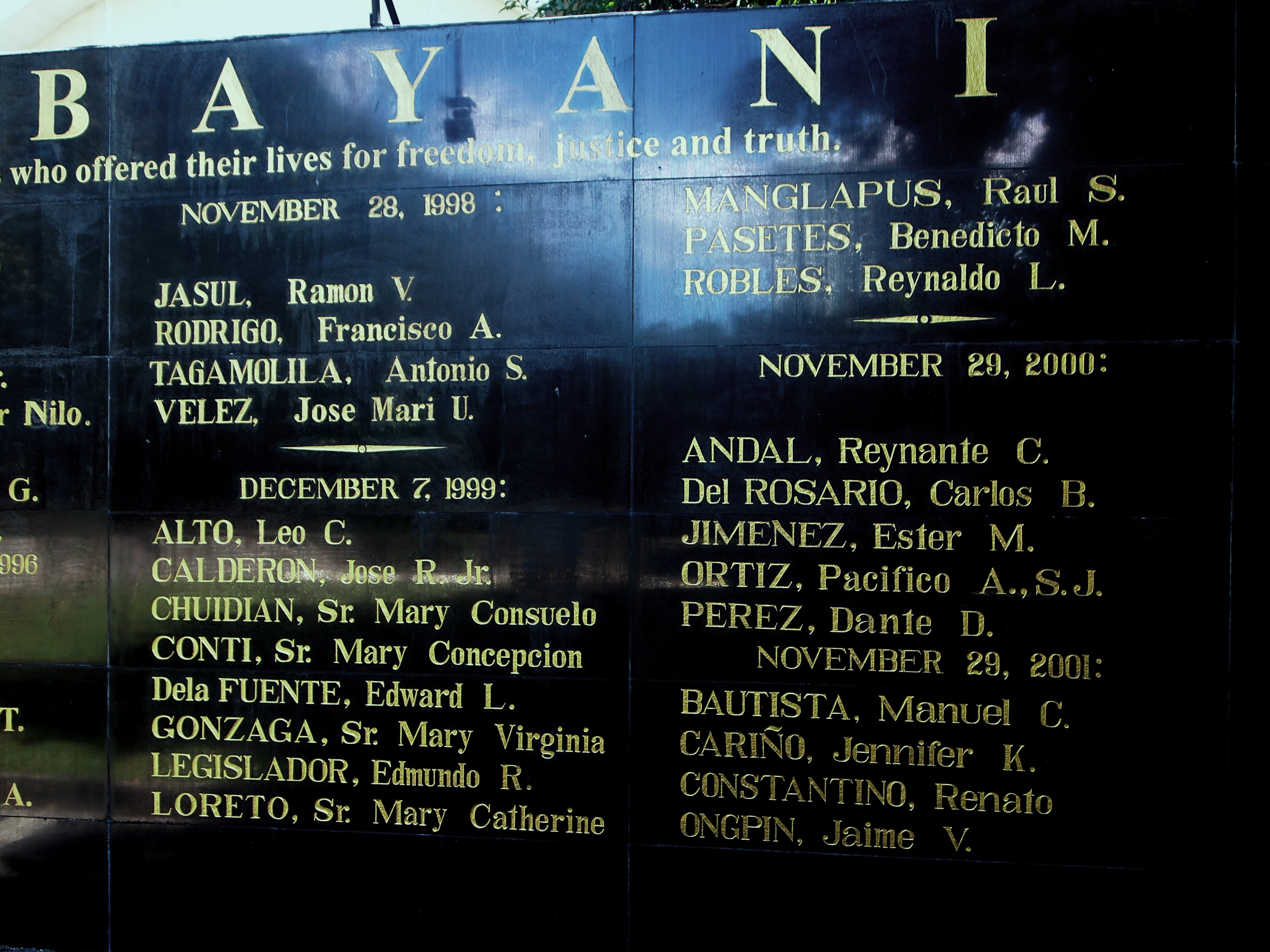
- Detail of the Wall of Remembrance at the Bantayog ng mga Bayani, showing names from the 2000 batch of Bantayog Honorees, including that of Pacifico Ortiz.

25th President of the Ateneo de Manila University
- In office 1969–1970
- Preceded by: James F. Donelan
- Succeeded by: Francisco Araneta

Personal details
- Born: September 25, 1913 Cantilan, Surigao, Philippine Islands
- Died: December 9, 1983 (aged 70) Manila, Philippines
- Profession: Professor; Jesuit priest

Pacifico Arreza Ortiz SJ (September 25, 1913 – December 9, 1983) was a Filipino Jesuit priest and academic. He is best known as a spiritual adviser of Manuel L. Quezon, for being the first Filipino president of the Ateneo de Manila University, and as a staunch critic of the Martial Law dictatorship of former Philippine President Ferdinand Marcos, especially while he served as the delegate for the province of Rizal to the 1971 Philippine Constitutional Convention.
