= Czarina Saloma =

Filipino sociologist

Personal details
- Born: Czarina Aya-ay Saloma
- Education: University of the Philippines Diliman (BA); Peking University (JD) (MA); Bielefeld University (PhD)

Czarina Aya-ay Saloma - Akpedonu is a Filipino sociologist who is the current Vice President for Higher Education of Ateneo de Manila University. Prior to this appointment, she was dean of the Dr Rosita G Leong School of Social Sciences at Ateneo de Manila University.

== Education ==
Saloma-Akpedonu has a bachelor's degree from the University of the Philippines Diliman, a master's degree from Peking University in China, and a doctorate (Dr. rer. soc.) from Bielefeld University in Germany.

== Books ==
Saloma-Akpedonu is the author of books including:

- Possible Worlds in Impossible Spaces: Globality, Knowledge, Gender and Information Technology in the Philippines (Ateneo de Manila University Press, 2006)
- Casa Boholana: Vintage Houses of Bohol (with Erik Akpedonu, Ateneo de Manila University Press, 2011)
- Many Journeys, Many Voices: The Life and Times of Filipina Overseas Workers, 1960-2010 (with Edna Manlapaz and Yael Buencamino, 2015, Anvil Publishing
- Food Consumption in the City: Practices and Patterns in Urban Asia and the Pacific (edited volume with Marlyne Sahakian and Suren Erkman, Routledge, 2016)
- New Consumers in the Global South No Longer Poor, Not Yet Middle Class (with Anna Cristina Pertierra, Rosana Pinheiro-Machado, Tingting Liu, Czarina Saloma, Ahtziri Molina) 2026. Berlin: De Gruyter

== Recognition ==
The National Academy of Science and Technology of the Philippines named Saloma-Akpedonu an outstanding young scientist in 2007. She has also served as president of the Philippine Sociological Society and the Women's Studies Association of the Philippines.
