= William Masterson =

American priest and educator (1910-1984)

- Born: December 7, 1910; Brooklyn, New York, U.S.
- Died: September 5, 1984 (aged 73)
- Education: Woodstock College; Georgetown University
- Occupation(s): Jesuit priest; teacher

William Francis Masterson, SJ (December 17, 1910 – September 5, 1984) was an American Jesuit priest who became an educational leader in the Philippines.

== Early life ==
Masterson was born on December 17, 1910, in Brooklyn, the son of physician John J. Masterson, who later became president of the Medical Society of the State of New York. He was educated by Jesuits, earning a bachelor's degree at Woodstock College in 1932 and a master's at Georgetown University in 1933.

He became an English teacher at the Ateneo de Manila University in 1933, and a leader of Catholic Boy Scouts in the Philippines. He returned to the US in 1936 for theological study at Woodstock College, and was ordained in 1939, by which time the outbreak of World War II had delayed his return to the Philippines. Instead, he became business editor for the Jesuit Missions magazine from 1941 to 1943, when he became director of the Jesuit Philippine Bureau in New York, using this posting to raise money for the postwar rebuilding of educational facilities in the Philippines.

== Educational leadership ==
In 1947, Masterson returned to Ateneo de Manila as rector and president, and served in that position until 1950. Under his leadership, the university re-opened its law school, opened a new graduate school and Institute of Social Action, and moved its campus from Padre Faura Street in downtown Manila to the Loyola Heights neighborhood of Quezon City.

Facing a backlash for this move, he was sent away from Ateneo and Manila to Cagayan de Oro, where he had previously spent his summers leading Boy Scout activities. He became head of the English department at Ateneo de Cagayan (later Xavier University), founded the Xavier University College of Agriculture (XUCA) in 1953, and founded the Southeast Asia Rural Social Leadership Institute in 1964. In 1968, he founded the Xavier Science Foundation, a non-government organization separate from the university that supports local agriculture, development, and education.

== Recognition ==
In 1967, Ateneo de Manila gave Masterson an honorary doctorate. He was awarded the Ramon Magsaysay Award for International Understanding in 1974, in recognition of "his multinational education and inspiration of rural leaders prompting their return to and love of the land".

The Cagayan de Oro Airport-Bukidnon Highway was renamed as Masterson Avenue in his honor, and the Fr. William F. Masterson SJ Elementary School in Cagayan de Oro, located on this avenue, was also renamed in his honor in 2013. The main road of Ateneo de Manila is named Father Masterson Drive.

In 2009, he was featured on a commemorative sheet of Philippine postage stamps, celebrating the sesquicentennial of Ateneo de Manila University.

In 2015, The Xavier University Press published a book of essays inspired by Masterson's life, Fr. William F. Masterson, S.J.: The Story of a Brooklyn Jesuit Missionary and the Xavier U. Aggies.
