= Horacio de la Costa =

Jesuit priest and historian

The reverend Horacio V. de la Costa S.J.
- Horacio de la Costa portrait, Loyola School of Theology, LHS, Loyola Schools.

Personal details
- Born: Horacio Villamayor de la Costa; May 9, 1916 Mauban, Tayabas, Philippine Islands
- Died: March 20, 1977 (aged 60) Quezon City, Philippines
- Occupation: Writer, historian and academic Political party Partido Demokratiko Sosyalista ng Pilipinas

Horacio Villamayor de la Costa S.J. (May 9, 1916 – March 20, 1977) was a Filipino Jesuit priest, historian and academic. He was the first Filipino Provincial Superior of the Society of Jesus in the Philippines, and a recognized authority in Philippine and Asian culture and history.

Ordained a Jesuit priest at the age of 30, he became, at age 55, the first Filipino provincial superior of this religious order, the Society of Jesus.

== Early life and education ==
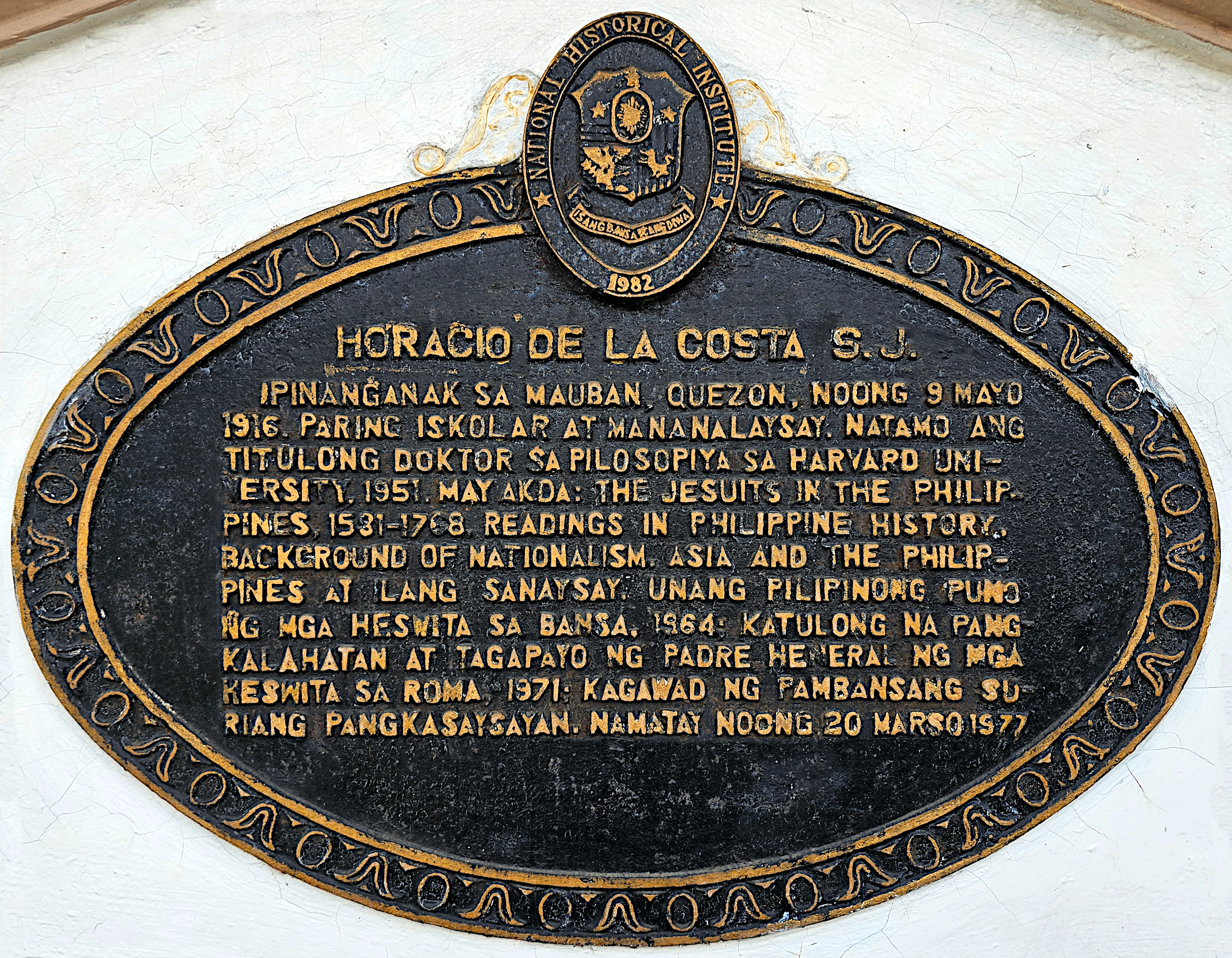
National historical marker installed in 1982 in Mauban

Horacio de la Costa was born in Maúban, Tayabas (now the province of Quezon) on May 9, 1916, to Judge Sixto de la Costa and Emiliana Villamayor.

De la Costa first attended the public elementary school in Batangas before moving on to the Ateneo de Manila, where he distinguished himself for academic excellence and student leadership, particularly as a writer and, later, as editor of The Guidon, the campus newspaper. After earning there his Bachelor of Arts degree, summa cum laude, in 1935, he entered the Society of Jesus at the Sacred Heart Novitiate in Novaliches, where he later completed his master's degree. Afterward, he went back to the Ateneo to teach philosophy and history for two years. During this time, he also worked as a writer and radio talent for the Chesteron Evidence Guild, more specifically, the "Common Weal Hour", for which he created the character of Teban, the calesa driver, at the height of the controversy over the 1940 divorce bill. The program evolved into "Kuwentong Kutsero", consisting of satirical tales dealing mostly with life in Manila.

== War-time and post-war activities ==
During the war, the Japanese imprisoned him for two months in Fort Santiago for his role in the resistance movement. He helped Rev. Fr. John F. Hurley, the Jesuits' superior, in taking clothes and medicines to American and Filipino soldiers who had evaded capture by the Japanese or escaped from Japanese prison camps. For this, he was awarded the Medal of Freedom by the United States government in 1946. Early in 1946, he left for the United States to pursue further studies in theology at Woodstock College, Maryland, where he was ordained a priest on March 24, 1946, by American Bishop John F. McNamara. He received his doctorate degree in history at Harvard University in 1951.

== Return to the Philippines ==
Back in the Philippines, he served anew with the faculty of the Ateneo de Manila in 1953, later becoming its first Filipino college dean while teaching history at the same time. In 1958, he was made a consultant of the Philippine province of the Society of Jesus and, in 1959, assumed the editorship of its scholarly publication, Philippine Studies. Fr. de la Costa received a Smith-Mundt-Fuldright scholarship in 1960. In 1962, he became a research associate of the London School of Oriental and African Studies. During this period, he received honorary doctorates from the University of Santo Tomás, Tokyo's Sophia University, and Dumaguete's Silliman University.

On December 8, 1964, he assumed office as provincial superior of the Philippine province of the Society of Jesus. His appointment ended the long line of Spanish and American Jesuits who were appointed to the said post in the Philippines.

== Works and achievements ==
De la Costa was the author of a number of books, particularly on Philippine culture and history, which revealed his nationalistic bent, among which are:

- The Jesuits in the Philippines, 1581–1768
- The Trial of Dr. Rizal, an edited translation of W.E. Retana's transcription of the official Spanish documents
- Recent Oriental History
- Readings in Philippines History
- The Background of Nationalism, and Other Essays
- Asia and the Philippines

He also contributed numerous articles on these subjects to various local and foreign scholarly publications, such as Philippine Social Sciences and Humanities Review, Bulletin of the Philippine Historical Association, Hispanic American Historical Review, Comment, Science Review, Theological Studies, and Philippine Studies. The Catholic Encyclopedia carries his article on the Philippines.

In 1965, he was presented the Republic Heritage Award by the then Philippine President Diosdado Macapagal for his historical writings. In 1971 he became General Assistant to the Superior General of the Society of Jesus, Pedro Arrupe, in Rome.

Fr. de le Costa was one of the founding members of the Philippine Academy of Science and Humanities, as well as the International Association of Historians of Asia. He was also a member of the National Research Council of the Philippines, Philippine Bibliographical Society, Philippine Historical Association and the National Historical Society of the National Historical Commission.

== Death and legacy ==
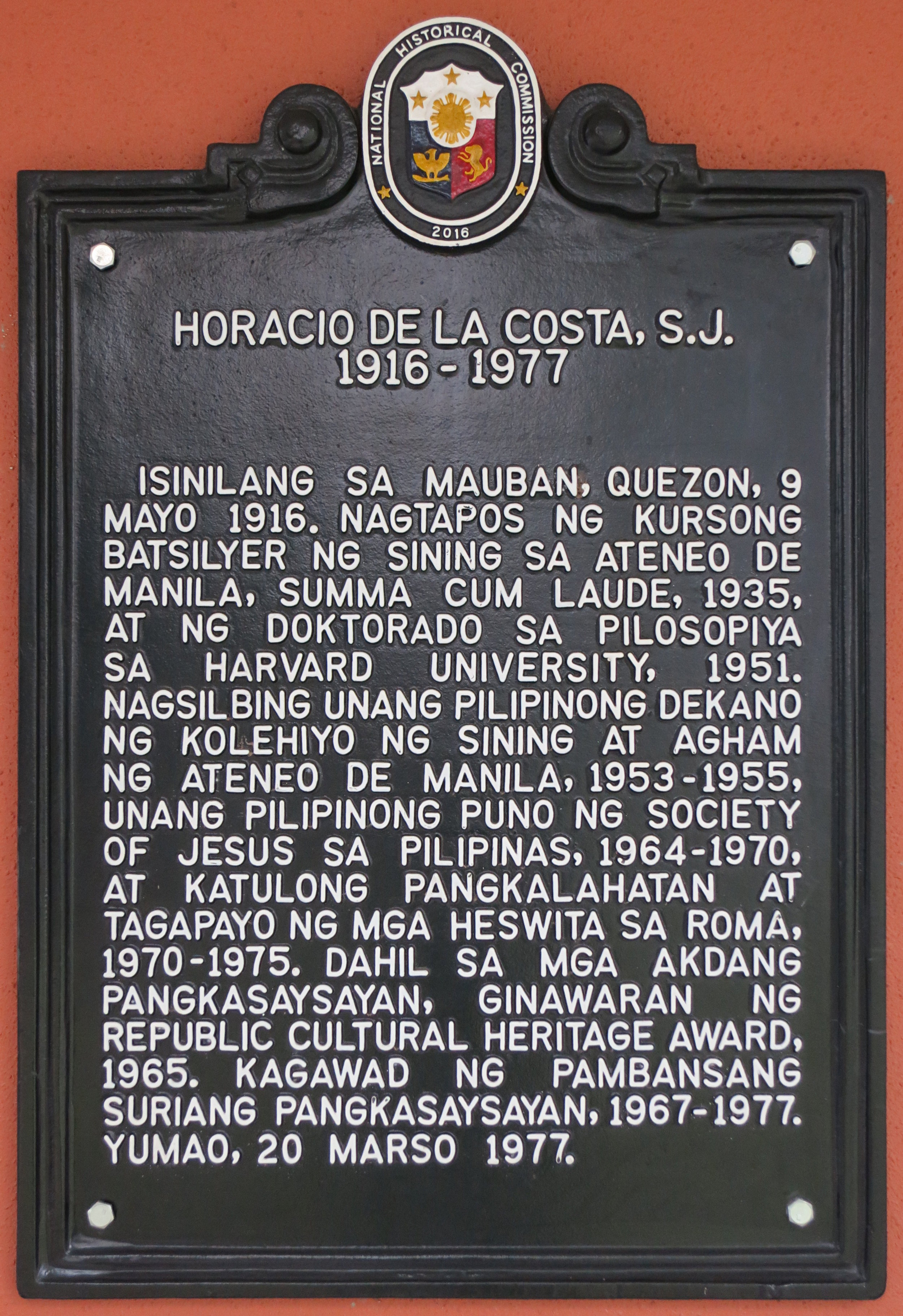
Historical marker installed by the National Historical Commission of the Philippines in 2017 at the Ateneo de Manila University.

A few years before his death, De la Costa attended the General Congregation of Jesuits from all over the world in Rome. In need of a composition on "The Jesuits Today", the delegates entrusted him the preparation. He worked on it by himself for three days. When he was finished, he returned to the congregation and read his draft. His composition was accepted exactly as he had written it.

De la Costa died of cancer on March 20, 1977, at the age of 60. He was buried in the Jesuit Novitiate Compound in Novaliches, Quezon City.

For his achievements in the Jesuit Philippine Province and the Jesuit congregation in general, the Loyola School of Theology of the Ateneo de Manila University was inaugurated while the Horacio de la Costa Hall in the same university was named, both in his honor.

A street in Salcedo Village in Makati's central business district, where the Ateneo de Manila's Salcedo Campus (which is home to the university's Graduate School of Business and the Center for Continuing Education) is located has been named after him as well.

In 1982, the National Historical Institute (now the National Historical Commission of the Philippines) unveiled a historical marker in his hometown of Mauban. Another marker was unveiled in 2017 at his namesake hall at the Ateneo de Manila.

In 2016, the Bangko Sentral ng Pilipinas released a limited edition one-peso commemorative coin in honor of de la Costa's 100th birth anniversary.
