= Amando Kapauan =

Filipino chemist

Amando F. Kapauan (July 4, 1931 – October 12, 1996) was a chemist and researcher.

He graduated magna cum laude from University of the Philippines, Diliman in 1952, with a bachelor's degree in chemistry. He obtained his doctorate from the University of Southern California in 1959.

In the Ateneo de Manila University Department of Chemistry, he worked on inorganic and physical chemistry, particularly on radioactive bromine. With other colleagues, he initiated investigations in the 1970s on heavy metals analysis in our environment. He was among the first to look into the problem of mercury in the environment, and he designed the appropriate equipment for mercury analysis in water, fish and soil.

Kapauan linked with international groups, taught one of the first environmental chemistry courses in the country, and involved himself in policies on urban-rural planning.

He later went into the field of electronics, specifically chemical instrumentation. Together with Fr. William Schmitt, S.J., they pioneered the maintenance, design and modification of instruments.

Kapauan's first publication appeared in the Journal of Chemical Education in May 1973.

He also started to interface traditional instruments with the increasingly popular PC. By the 1980s, his students were designing software for them, including Fourier Transform of signals. He redesigned a spectrophotometer with vacuum-tube technology into one with solid-state technology, run by a PC with software written by his students.

He designed and built new electrochemical systems, which merited publications in Analytical Chemistry (the leading journal of analytical chemistry worldwide). This was an honor considering that these were the few, if not the only, international publications done by one Filipino, entirely in the Philippines.

He continued to find applications for these electrochemical systems, dreaming that they might be distributed to data stations all over the country for trace analysis of metals and for mapping of water quality.

He was one of the founders of the Philippine Institute of Pure and Applied Chemistry, and one of the architects of the Ph.D. program of the UP-Ateneo-DLSU Chemistry Consortium. He moved into environmental concerns and microelectronics in the infant stages of their applications in chemistry.

He wrote a college textbook, General Chemistry, with Amando Clemente and Antonio I. de Leon.

He made “Cardboard Orbital Domain Models” and published this in Journal of Chemical Education in August 1966.

His 1967 Unesco stint in Thailand brought together a series of innovative experiments for “lab-less” high schools, which was eventually published as a book, Creative Chemistry.

Kapauan replaced expensive equipment with materials he bought from the grocery, hardware, photo supply and the drugstore. He taught his students to do audio-visuals, including 8-mm animated films, molecular models, and computer-aided instruction.

Kapauan died on October 12, 1996.
