= Joseph Galdon =

Fr. Joseph Galdon, S.J. (September 24, 1928 – March 15, 2010) was a Jesuit priest and writer. He was a former dean at the Ateneo de Manila University, Philippines.

He first went to the Philippines in the 1950s as a novice. He was ordained in the United States on June 20, 1959 by Cardinal Francis Spellman at Fordham University.

He returned to the Philippines in 1965 and started his teaching career, first at the Sacred Heart Novitiate in Novaliches, Quezon City, and then in 1968 at the Loyola House of Studies in the Ateneo de Manila University compound. Galdon retired in 2003 due to poor health. Among his students was Viel Aquino, one of the daughters of former President Corazon Aquino.

He was named Dean of the College of Arts and Sciences from 1968 to 1970. He also assumed the position of Department Chair (English), Rector of the Jesuit Residence and Director of Admission and Aid. He was also the editor of the academic journal Philippine Studies.

Besides his scholarly work on Philippine studies, he also authored a number of inspirational books: Mustard Seed, Chain of Love, Jubilee and More Mustard Seed. He was also a columnist for the Philippine Daily Inquirer.

He died due to old age on March 15, 2010, at the Jesuit Residence Infirmary at the Ateneo.
