= Roberto Yap =

Filipino priest and economist (born 1959)

The Very Reverend Roberto Yap S.J., Ph.D.

31st President of the Ateneo de Manila University
- Incumbent
- Assumed office August 1, 2020
- Preceded by: Fr. Jose Ramon Villarin

16th President of Xavier University – Ateneo de Cagayan
- In office August 15, 2011 – July 31, 2020
- Preceded by: Fr. Jose Ramon Villarin
- Succeeded by: Fr. Mars Tan

Personal details
- Born: May 16, 1959 (age 67) Cebu, Philippines
- Education: Ateneo de Manila University (BA, STB); The New School (MA); Harvard University (MPP); University College London (PhD)
- Profession: Economist; Professor; Jesuit Priest

Roberto Chan Yap, S.J. known as "Father Bobby", is a Filipino economist and Jesuit who currently serves as the 31st president of the Ateneo de Manila University. He assumed office on August 1, 2020 and succeeded Fr. Jose Ramon Villarin. Prior to this, he was president of Xavier University - Ateneo de Cagayan.

== Early life and education ==
Fr. Bobby was born in Cebu, Philippines, on May 16, 1959. He earned his Bachelor of Arts degree in economics, cum laude, from the Ateneo de Manila University in 1980. He attended the New School for Social Research in New York, United States, graduating in 1988 with a Master of Arts degree in economics. He returned to the Ateneo de Manila to attend the Loyola School of Theology for a Bachelor of Sacred Theology degree, receiving the degree in 1992, summa cum laude. He also attended the John F. Kennedy School of Government of Harvard University in Cambridge, United States, and was conferred a Master of Public Policy degree in 1995. In 2002, he earned his Ph.D. in Economics from University College London.

== As a Jesuit ==
Fr. Bobby entered the Society of Jesus on May 30, 1982, and was ordained priest on March 14, 1992.

== As an educator ==
From 1980 to 1982, Fr. Bobby was an instructor at the Ateneo de Manila University High School. Since 2002, he has been an assistant professor at the Department of Economics of the Ateneo de Manila University, but is presently "on leave."

In 2011, became president of Xavier University – Ateneo de Cagayan. He is also a member of the board of trustees of the Ateneo de Davao University, Ateneo de Manila University, and the Ateneo de Zamboanga University.

== As a professional ==
Fr. Bobby served and still serves in different capacities in church, academe, and research centers.

Position	Term of Office	Organization
President	2020–present	Ateneo de Manila University
President	2011–2020	Xavier University – Ateneo de Cagayan
Province Treasurer	2007–Present	Philippine Province of the Society of Jesus
Assistant Professor (on leave)	2007–Present	Department of Economics, Ateneo de Manila University
Research Associate	2002-2011	John J Carroll Institute on Church and Social Issues
Province Assistant for the Social Apostolate	2004-2009	Philippine Province of the Society of Jesus
Environmental Economist	2004-2009	Klima Climate Change Center, Manila Observatory
Acting Director	1993	Institute on Church and Social Issues
Acting Parish Priest	1992	Miraculous Medal Parish, Lumbia, Cagayan de Oro
Project Director	1988-1992	Institute on Church and Social Issues
Instructor	1980-1982	Ateneo de Manila University High School
