= Miguel Bernad =

Filipino historian and Jesuit priest

Miguel Anselmo Azcona Bernad, S.J. (May 8, 1917 – March 15, 2009) was a Filipino Jesuit priest, educator, linguist, critic, academic, historian, author, journalist and editor. Son of Misamis Mayor and Misamis Occidental Governor Don Anselmo Bernad, he entered the Society of Jesus on June 7, 1932 and was ordained March 24, 1946 in the Fordham University Church. He was editor-in-chief of Philippine Studies from 1956 to 1959 and founder of Kinaadman Journal Research Office in 1979.

His doctoral dissertation at Yale University (1951) was entitled, "The Faculty of Arts in the Jesuit Colleges in the Eastern Part of the United States: Theory and Practice, 1782−1923." A few of his early publications treat Jesuit education, notably "The Class of Humanities in the Ratio Studiorum" (1953) and "The Ignatian Way in Education" (1956). Worldcat credits Bernad with 72 works in 216 publications.

His memorabilia collection is housed at Xavier University – Ateneo de Cagayan. He was buried at the Manresa Jesuit Cemetery at SEARSOLIN, a research center of the university.

== Partial bibliography ==
- "The class of Humanities in the Ratio studiorum," Jesuit Educational Quarterly 15 (March 1953): 197–205. Available through the Jesuit Portal.
- "The Ignatian Way in Education," Philippine Studies 4:2 (1956): 195−214. Available through JStor.
- Religious revolution in the Philippines (1960-). With Pedro S. de Achútegui (Manila, Ateneo de Manila)
- Bamboo and the greenwood tree; essays on Filipino literature in English. (1961) (Manila, Bookmark)
- Written on bamboo and silk : the beginnings of Chinese books and inscriptions. (1962) (Tsuen-hsuin Tsien)
- "Philippine literature : a twofold renaissance" (1963) Thought, Fordham University quarterly, vol. xxxvii, no. 146, autumn 1962
- History against the landscape; personal and historical essays about the Philippines (1968) (Manila, Solidaridad Pub. House)
- The Christianization of the Philippines : problems and perspectives. (1972) (Manila : Filipiniana Book Guild)
- Aguinaldo and the revolution of 1896 : a documentary history. With by Pedro S. de Achútegui. (1972) (Manila, Philippines: Ateneo de Manila)
- Tradition & discontinuity : essays on Philippine history & culture (1983) (Metro Manila : National Book Store)
- The golden world and the darkness : Shakespearean plays and their performance (2003) (Malate, Manila, Philippines : De La Salle University Press)
- The great island : studies in the exploration and evangelization of Mindanao (2005) (Ateneo De Manila Univ Pr)
- The waiter and the fisherman : and other essays in literature and culture (2008) (Quezon City : Ateneo de Manila University Press)
