= John Paul Vergara =

John Paul Vergara, Ph.D

3rd Vice-President for the Loyola Schools of the Ateneo de Manila University
- In office April 1, 2010 – May 31, 2016
- Preceded by: Ma. Assunta Caoile-Cuyegkeng, Ph.D.
- Succeeded by: Ma. Luz C. Vilches, Ph.D.

Personal details
- Education: Ateneo de Manila University; Virginia Polytechnic Institute and State University
- Profession: Scientist; Professor

John Paul C. Vergara is a professor at the Department of Information Systems and Computer Science, School of Science and Engineering, Ateneo de Manila University. He is the former the Vice President for the Loyola Schools of the University, succeeding Ma. Assunta Caoile-Cuyegkeng, Ph.D, as well as former Vice President for the Ateneo Professional Schools.

== Education ==
Vergara graduated from Philippine Science High School in 1982. He then attended the Ateneo de Manila University as National Science and Technology Agency scholar, graduating with a Bachelor of Science degree with majors in Computer Science and in Mathematics in 1986. In 1990, he completed his Master of Science studies in computer science and applications at Virginia Polytechnic Institute and State University (Virginia Tech). In 1997, he completed his doctorate in the same field at the same institution, where he was recognized for Scholarly Performance in Graduate Study.

== As a scientist and educator ==
Vergara became a member of the Ateneo de Manila University faculty in 1986. He became professor and chair of the Department of Information Systems and Computer Science, and also became head of the Information Technology department of the Ateneo Graduate School of Business as well as Assistant Director of the Ateneo Information Technology Institute. In 2008, he was a visiting adjunct professor at Virginia Tech's Department of Computer Science. Vergara has also held numerous consulting positions, is a member of numerous scientific organizations, and has refereed various academic journals.

== As Ateneo administrator ==
Vergara was appointed Vice President for Administration and Planning by the Ateneo's Board of Trustees, a position he held from April 2009 to March 2010. Subsequently, he was chosen as the next Vice President for the Loyola Schools.

== Awards and recognition ==
Vergara's awards include recognition for Scholarly Performance in Graduate Study by Virginia Tech in 1997. He was also awarded the DuPont Miracles of Science Award by DuPont Far East in July 2001. Vergara was likewise named one of the Outstanding Young Scientists by the Philippines' National Academy of Science and Technology.
