= Jose Ramon Villarin =

30th president of Ateneo de Manila University

The Very Reverend Jose Ramon Villarin S.J.
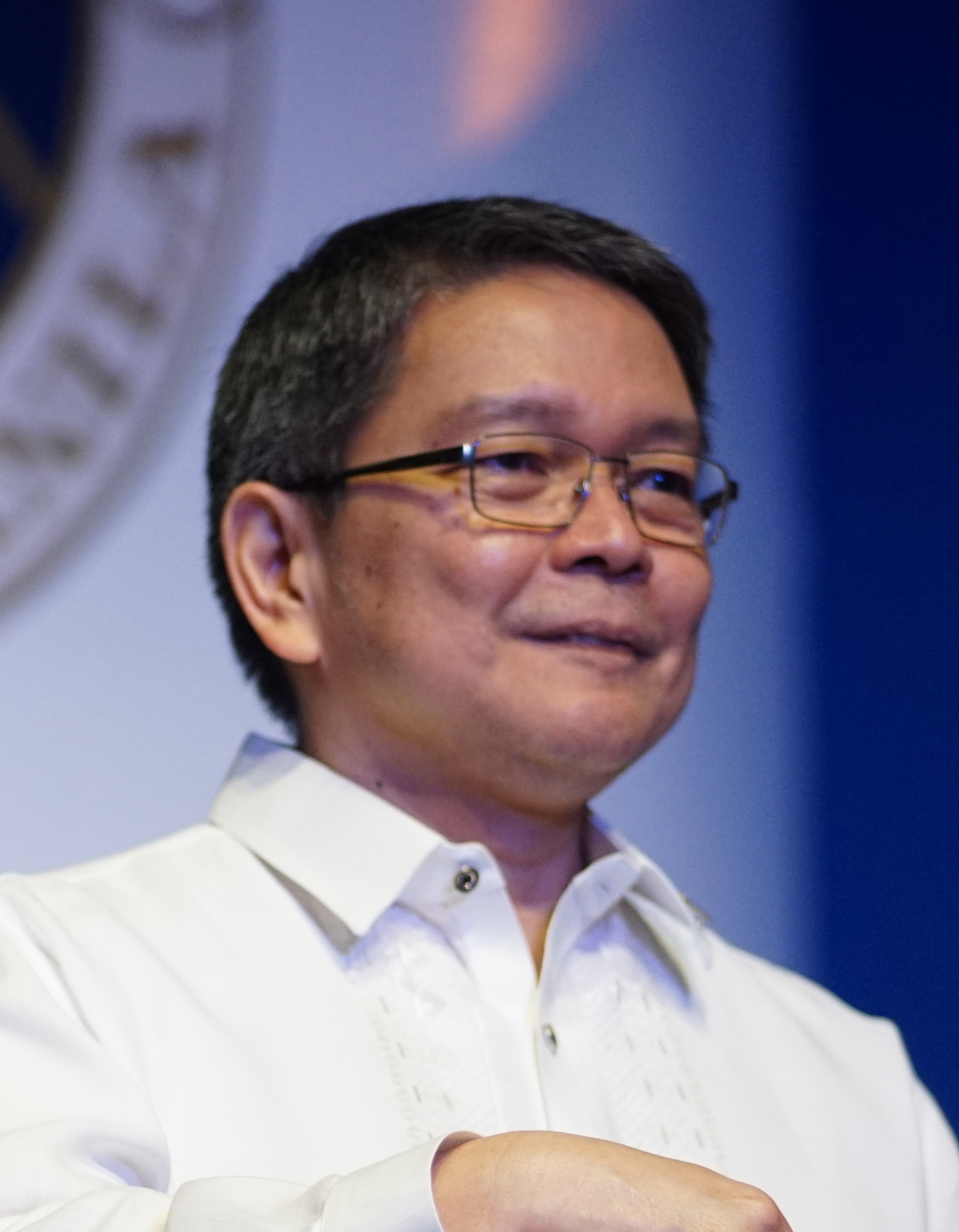

30th President of the Ateneo de Manila University
- In office June 1, 2011 – July 31, 2020
- Preceded by: Bienvenido Nebres
- Succeeded by: Roberto Yap

Personal details
- Born: Jose Ramon Tizon Villarin; January 30, 1960 (age 66) Philippines
- Education: Ateneo de Manila University (BS, STB); Marquette University (MS); Georgia Institute of Technology (PhD)
- Profession: Physicist; Professor; Jesuit priest

Jose Ramon Tizon Villarin, S.J., known as "Fr. Jett" to his students and colleagues, is a Filipino Jesuit priest and scientist who served as the 30th president of the Ateneo de Manila University. On June 29, 2010, he was elected to succeed Bienvenido Nebres as president, and later elected for two more terms before stepping down on July 31, 2020. Prior to his Ateneo De Manila presidency, he was succeeded as President of Xavier University - Ateneo de Cagayan by Roberto Yap.

== Early life and education ==
Villarin was born on January 30, 1960. He attended the Ateneo de Manila University for his undergraduate studies, receiving a Bachelor of Science in physics, magna cum laude, graduating in 1980 as class valedictorian. Subsequently, he entered the Society of Jesus, and earned philosophy credits at the Ateneo de Manila graduate school as pre-requisites for seminary theology. He then attended the Loyola School of Theology, a federated unit within Ateneo de Manila, and received his Bachelor of Sacred Theology, summa cum laude, in 1985. He then did graduate work in the United States, receiving a Master of Science in physics from Marquette University in 1987, and his Ph.D. in atmospheric physics from Georgia Institute of Technology in 1997.

== As a Jesuit ==
Villarin entered the Sacred Heart Novitiate in Novaliches on May 30, 1981. He made simple profession of vows on May 31, 1983. He was ordained a priest on April 20, 1991, and took his final vows in January 2005.

== As a scientist and educator ==
Villarin served in various capacities throughout his career as a scientist. He worked at Georgia Tech as a graduate research assistant and as a researcher in the Laser Laboratory of the Ateneo. He was the head of the Climate Studies Division of the Manila Observatory. He is currently an assistant professor at the Department of Physics in the School of Science and Engineering at the Ateneo.

He received the National Outstanding Young Scientist award in 2000 and the Outstanding Book Award for "Disturbing Climate" in 2002. He is also an active member of several local and international environment and climate committees, such as the United Nations' Consultative Group of Experts for Developing Countries, and the Inter-Agency Committee on Climate Change, among others.

In 2005, he became president of Xavier University-Ateneo de Cagayan, and became a member of the Board of Trustees of the Ateneo de Manila University in 2009. He also sits as a member of the boards of trustees of the Ateneo de Davao University, the Ateneo de Naga University, and the Ateneo de Zamboanga University.

In 2011, he became the president of the Ateneo de Manila University.

Villarin, through his work on greenhouse gas emissions, was a member of the Intergovernmental Panel on Climate Change that received the 2007 Nobel Peace Prize together with a team of climate scientists. The award is also shared with former vice president of the United States Al Gore.

== See also ==
- List of Filipino Nobel laureates and nominees
