= Joaquin Bernas =

Filipino academic (1932–2021)

Joaquin G. Bernas SJ
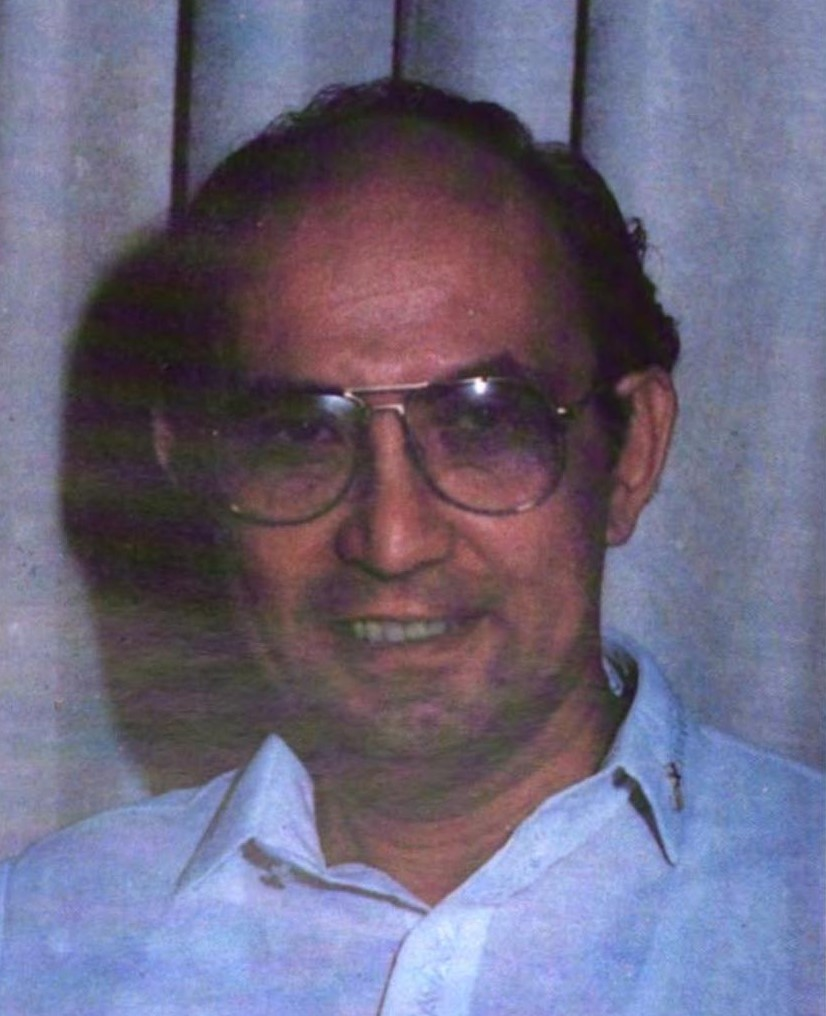
- Bernas from the Official Directory of the Constitutional Commission, c. 1986

28th President of the Ateneo de Manila University
- In office April 1, 1984 – April 1, 1993
- Preceded by: Jose A. Cruz
- Succeeded by: Bienvenido Nebres

Member of the Philippine Constitutional Commission
- In office June 2, 1986 – October 15, 1986
- President: Corazon Aquino

Personal details
- Born: July 7, 1932 Baao, Camarines Sur, Philippine Islands
- Died: March 6, 2021 (aged 88) Quezon City, Philippines
- Education: Berchmans College; Ateneo de Manila University; Woodstock College; New York University
- Profession: Lawyer; Professor; Jesuit Priest

Ecclesiastical career
- Religion: Roman Catholic
- Ordained: 1965

Joaquin Guevara Bernas SJ (July 7, 1932 – March 6, 2021) was a Jesuit priest, lawyer, college professor and writer who was Dean Emeritus of the Ateneo de Manila Law School in Makati, Philippines. He was a member of the 1986 Constitutional Commission which drafted the 1987 Philippine Constitution.

Bernas specialized in the Philippine Constitution and was an author of law books and articles.

== Education ==
Bernas was born in Baao, Camarines Sur in 1932 and raised in Naga, and he graduated Ateneo de Naga University for his high school degree in 1950. He moved to Cebu and earned his Bachelor of Arts degree in English, Latin, and Greek Classics, and right after a Master of Arts degree in Philosophy at the Berchmans College school for Theology (now housed at Ateneo de Manila University, the previous site is now the current home of the University of the Philippines Cebu) in 1956 and 1957, respectively. He arrived in Manila thereafter with dreams to become a lawyer as well. In 1962, he received his Bachelor of Laws degree from Ateneo de Manila Law School as its valedictorian and placed 9th in the bar examinations given that year. He simultaneously applied to join the Society of Jesus in 1950 as the vocation was his primary goal and was eventually ordained to the priesthood in 1965.

Bernas had a Licentiate of Sacred Theology from Woodstock College in 1966, Master of Laws and Doctor of Juridical Science from New York University in 1965 and 1968, respectively.

== Career ==
Bernas began teaching at Ateneo de Manila Law School in 1966. He served as dean twice during 1972 to 1976 and 2000 to 2004 and president of Ateneo de Manila University during 1984 to 1993. Upon his retirement as Law Dean in 2004, Bernas was conferred the position of Dean Emeritus at Ateneo School of Law. He continued to teach Constitutional Law and Public International Law to law freshmen and sophomores.

He was a member of the Constitutional Commission formed by President Corazon Aquino in 1986, a Provincial Superior of the Society of Jesus in the Philippines during 1976 to 1982, rector of the Jesuit Residence during 1994 to 2000 and a director of the Philippine Stock Exchange.

== Later life and death ==
Bernas was confined at The Medical City for six weeks due to an infection and was discharged from the hospital on March 4, 2021. Bernas died at the Ateneo Jesuit Residence inside the Ateneo de Manila University campus in Quezon City on March 6, 2021. He died at the age of 88.

== Publications ==
- The Intent of the 1986 Constitution Writers (1995)
- The 1987 Constitution of the Republic of the Philippines: A Commentary (1996)
- Constitutional Structure and Powers of Government: Notes and Cases (1997)
- A Living Constitution: The Ramos Presidency (1999) (ISBN 971-27-0787-3)
- A Living Constitution: The Cory Aquino Presidency (2000) (ISBN 971-27-0915-9)
- "From One-Man Rule to People Power" (2001)
- An Introduction to Public International Law (2002)
- A Living Constitution: The Abbreviated Estrada Presidency (2003) (ISBN 971-550-433-7)
- Constitutional Rights and Social Demands: Notes and Cases (2004)
- The 1987 Constitution of the Philippines: A Comprehensive Reviewer (2006)
- A Living Constitution: The Troubled Arroyo Presidency (2007) (ISBN 978-971-550-520-8)
- A Living Constitution: Constitutional Issues Arising During the Troubled Gloria Arroyo Presidency Part II (2010) (ISBN 978-971-030-564-3)
