= Xavier University – Ateneo de Cagayan =

Roman Catholic university in Cagayan de Oro, Philippines

Xavier University Ateneo de Cagayan
- Pamantasang Xavier – Ateneo de Cagayan (Filipino)
- Seal
- Former names: Ateneo de Cagayan (1933–1958)
- Motto: Latin: Veritas Liberabit Vos
- Motto in English: "The Truth shall set you free" (John 8:32)
- Type: Private Roman Catholic Research Non-profit Coeducational Basic and Higher education institution
- Established: June 7, 1933; 93 years ago
- Founder: James Hayes
- Religious affiliation: Catholic Church (Jesuit)
- Academic affiliations: AJCU-AP, PAASCU, JBEC, CEAP
- Chairman: Francisco F. Guerra III
- President: Fr. Mars P. Tan, S.J.
- Rector: Fr. Ismael Jose Gonzaga, S.J. (Loyola House Jesuit Community)
- Principal: List: Rogelio L. Gawahan (Senior High School); Pamela Q. Pajente (Junior High School); Fr. Frank Savadera, S.J. (Grade School)
- Chaplains: List: Fr. Gabriel Gonzalez, S.J. (University Chaplain); Fr. Raymund Benedict Hizon, S.J. (Senior High School Chaplain); Fr. Errol Nebrao, S.J. (Junior High School Chaplain); Fr. Arman Samonte, S.J. (Grade School Chaplain)
- Academic staff: 531
- Students: 13,713 (2016)
- Location: Corrales Avenue, Cagayan de Oro, Misamis Oriental, Philippines; 8°28′35.96″N 124°38′48.85″E
- Campus: List; Main Campus 8 hectares (80,000 m^{2}) Corrales Ave., Divisoria, Cagayan de Oro (Undergraduate/Graduate & Professional); Pueblo de Oro Campus 13 hectares (130,000 m^{2}) (Basic Education & Sports Complex); Manresa Campus 50 hectares (500,000 m^{2}) (Agriculture & Integrated Technologies); Maria Reyna Xavier University Hospital (Nursing and Medicine)
- Newspaper: The Crusader Publication
- University Church: Church of the Immaculate Conception
- Colors: Blue and White
- Nickname: Xavier Crusaders
- Mascots: College: Crusader Knight; High school: Squires; Grade school: Pages
- Alma Mater Song: "Xavier, Alma Mater"
- Website: www.xu.edu.ph
- Location in Mindanao Location in the Philippines

The Xavier University – Ateneo de Cagayan (Filipino: Pamantasang Ateneo de Cagayan; Spanish: Universidad Ateneo de Cagayan), also known simply as the Ateneo de Cagayan, Xavier or XU is a private, Catholic, coeducational, basic and higher education institution. It is operated by the Philippine Province of the Society of Jesus in Cagayan de Oro, Misamis Oriental, Philippines. Founded in 1933 as the Ateneo de Cagayan, it became the first higher education institution in Mindanao to receive a university status a year before its sister school Ateneo de Manila. It was given its present name in honor of the Jesuit missionary St. Francis Xavier.

The university offers primary and secondary education as well as undergraduate and post-graduate education in humanities, social sciences, engineering, management and business. It offers professional degrees through graduate schools such as Xavier Ateneo College of Law and Jose P. Rizal School of Medicine.

== History ==
=== University status ===
Rector Fr. Francisco Z. Araneta, S.J., had vowed to St. Francis Xavier that if Ateneo de Cagayan was granted university status before its commencement exercises on March 22, 1958, he would rename it after the saint. An hour before the commencement exercises, then-Secretary of Education Manuel Lim sent a telegram stating that Ateneo de Cagayan now had university status. On August 27, 1958, it was inaugurated as a university and officially became Xavier University – Ateneo de Cagayan. It became the first higher education institution in Mindanao to receive university status, a year before its sister school, the Ateneo de Manila. At the inauguration banquet, President Carlos P. Garcia received the first honorary degree conferred by the university.

== Campuses ==
Main Campus

Xavier University – Ateneo de Cagayan operates on four campuses:

- The eight-hectare main campus in the heart of Cagayan de Oro, where the undergraduate and graduate academic units are located;
- The 50-hectare Manresa Complex in front of SM City Cagayan de Oro, which is used as the experimental and demonstration farms and extension works of the College of Agriculture, as well as the headquarters of SEARSOLIN, an outreach unit of the university; it also houses the Jose Chavez Alvarez Technology Complex of the Andrew L. Gotianun Sr. Center for Integrated Technologies;
- The 13-hectare basic education campus in Pueblo de Oro where the grade school, junior high school, and senior high school departments are based, as well as the university's sports complex; the grade school used to have another campus in Barangay Macasandig before it finally closed in late 2021; and
- The Maria Reyna Xavier University Hospital in Barangay Camaman-an (jointly run by Xavier, the Archdiocese of Cagayan de Oro, and the Sisters of Saint Paul of Chartres), which also serves as the training hospital for nursing and medicine students.

=== Campus of the Future project ===
In 2017, the institution proposed the ₱2.1 billion peso plan of the 21-hectare expansion project the Campus of the Future which would sell at least 4 hectares of its 6-hectare downtown campus and another 14-hectares of a 63-hectare agricultural property in Cagayan de Oro. "First-class education needs first-class building and campus design." Xavier Ateneo President Fr. Mars P. Tan stated.

Cagayan de Oro Mayor Oscar Moreno also hailed the plan, saying the plan would "redefine" and change the landscape of Northern Mindanao's capital city. However, there has been some opposition from alumni and retired faculty and staff, citing long-term traffic issues in the uptown area, as well as the heritage status of the main campus.

In line with this, the Provincial Superior of the Jesuits in the Philippines, Fr. Primitivo E. Viray, S.J., endorsed the plan to the Superior General of the Society of Jesus in Rome, the Very Rev. Arturo A. Sosa, S.J., whom gave the green-light to endorsed the plan to the Vatican for its approval.

In 2021, the Vatican has finally given its seal of approval for the Campus of the Future project of Xavier University – Ateneo de Cagayan. "The long wait for the final decision only showed the amount of time devoted by the Church authorities to review and study the project." in a statement said.

== Governance ==
The university is governed by a Board of Trustees, led by Francisco F. Guerra III as the chairman. Fr. Mars P. Tan, S.J., University President since July 31, 2020, is a member of the Board.

As one of six Jesuit colleges and universities in the Philippines, Xavier Ateneo also forms a consortium with the other two Jesuit universities in Mindanao, namely: Ateneo de Davao University and Ateneo de Zamboanga University.

Rectors of Ateneo de Cagayan (1933–1958) and Presidents of Xavier University–Ateneo de Cagayan (1958–present)
Name	Tenure
Most Rev. James T. G. Hayes, S.J., D.D.	1933
Fr. Joseph L. Lucas, S.J.	1933–1934
Fr. Vincent L. Kenally, S.J	1934–1935
Fr. George J. Kitchgessner, S.J.	1935–1937
Fr. Edward F. Haggerty, S.J.	1937–1949
Fr. Andrew F. Cervini, S.J.	1949–1956
Fr. Francisco Z. Araneta, S.J.	1958–1959
Fr. James J. McMahon, S.J.	1959–1964
Fr. Cornelius J. Quirkes, S.J.	1964–1967
Fr. Luis F. Torralba, S.J.	1967–1973
Fr. Federico O. Escaler, S.J.	1973–1976
Fr. Ernesto O. Javier, S.J.	1976–1990
Fr. Bienvenido F. Nebres, S.J., Ph.D.	1990–1993
Fr. Antonio S. Samson, S.J.	1993–2005
Fr. Jose Ramon T. Villarin, S.J., Ph.D.	2005–2011
Fr. Roberto C. Yap, S.J., Ph.D.	2011–2020
Fr. Mars P. Tan, S.J., Ph.D.	2020–present

== Academics ==
=== Professional schools ===
==== Graduate school ====
The Graduate School offers the university's post-baccalaureate programs, through doctoral studies. Its council is the Graduate School Student Council.

==== School of Law ====
The School of Law offers a Juris Doctor program. Its student council is the Association of Law Students. Its team is called Legis and its mascot is the goddess Dike (Lady Justice).

Studies are both history and research-oriented, and offer legal aid for the marginalized members of society through the Xavier University Center for Legal Assistance.

The School of Law aspires to attain superior performance and service. Its students have won in national and international moot court competitions and law debates. It has produced graduates who are nationally distinguished law practitioners, corporate counsels, policy makers, local chief executives, and judiciary officials.

On November 11, 2011, the School was named an "Outstanding Law School" by the Legal Education Board of the Supreme Court of the Philippines, and it was recognized as being one of the ten best-performing law schools in the Philippines from 2001 to 2011. A plaque was presented to its dean, Atty. Raul R. Villanueva, as outstanding law dean. On the 2015 bar exam the school ranked seventh among law-schools-with-20-examinees-or-more, and one examinee came in eighth.

==== Dr. Jose P. Rizal School of Medicine ====
The Dr Jose P Rizal School of Medicine is housed in a five-storey building located at the east side of Xavier Ateneo campus. The Medical Library with 5,000 volumes and 256 journals is the Mindanao repository for World Health Organization publications.

Founded in 1983, the medical school has Level 3 Accredited Status from the Philippine Accrediting Association of Schools, Colleges and Universities.

=== Undergraduate schools ===
==== College of Agriculture ====
The College of Agriculture was founded in 1954. Its student council is the Agriculture or Aggies Student Council. They are known by the monikers 'Aggies' and 'Bullriders', and its mascot is the bull. Program offerings include Agribusiness, Agricultural Engineering, Food Technology, Development Communication, and Agriculture with majors in agricultural economics, animal science, and crop science.

The college pursues an integrated program of instruction, research, extension, and production to educate students in sustainable agriculture and other relevant technologies and in equitable access to resources in the context of "global liberalization" and "grassroots people participation." Manresa Farm offers research, outreach, and production opportunities, which are supplemented by team-building and ongoing faculty development. Opportunities include immersion in communities and internships with companies and organizations.

On February 27, 2009, Commission on Higher Education (CHED) declared Xavier Ateneo Center of Development in Agriculture for three years, the first private institution given this designation. In December 2015, it was declared as a Center of Excellence in Agriculture. In November 2009, CHED declared Xavier a National Center of Excellence, specifically a Provincial Institute for Agriculture (PIA) under the National Agriculture and Fisheries Education System. As a PIA, Xavier is among the priority partners of CHED in implementing development projects in agriculture.

Xavier Ateneo qualifies for a ₱500,000 grant to fund scholarships, continuing agriculture education programs, instructional materials development, and upgrading of facilities including research laboratories, among other priority projects supported by CHED. The college has Level III PAASCU accreditation valid until May 2020. The college has produced five topnotchers and over 50 top-10 finishers on the agriculture licensure examination.

==== College of Arts and Sciences ====
The College of Arts and Sciences, with more than 160 on the faculty, offers most of the university's core subjects, e.g., Filipino, English, humanities, natural and social sciences. Its student council is the United Arts and Sciences Student Council. Its mascot is the Tiger.

Its linkages with Local Government Units sustain its Coastal Research Management and strengthen its research and extension network. The Office of International Cooperation and Networking negotiates with foreign universities for international linkages. The Arts and Sciences programs of the university are PAASCU Level IV accredited with its Literature and Biology programs declared as a CHED Center of Development.

==== College of Computer Studies ====
The College of Computer Studies (CCS), founded in 2011, offers programs in Computer Science, in Information Systems, in Information Technology and in Entertainment and Multimedia Computing.

The CCS maintains partnerships and linkages with other academic, industry, and government institutions to augment its instruction, research, and social outreach capabilities and to enhance the delivery of its curricular offerings. For instance, it has been a long-time partner and training provider of the SMART Schools/Microsoft Partners in Learning Program – a collaborative project of SMART, Microsoft, PBSP, DepEd that provides service to the community through IT training programs for public schools.

==== College of Engineering ====
The College of Engineering was founded in 1979 with 374 students and specialties in chemical, civil, electrical, and mechanical engineering. Of this first class only 51 graduated in 1984, 30 of these in civil engineering. Programs in electronics and industrial engineering were added in 1993, and the Masters in Engineering after 1995. In 2015 the pass rate ranged from 73% in electrical to 100% in mechanical engineering. All the programs are PAASCU Level II accredited and all but industrial engineering are CHED Centers of Development.

==== College of Nursing ====
The College of Nursing was founded in 1989 and was recognized by the Commission on Higher Education in 1992. The first batch in 1993 had a 100% passing rate in the Integrated Nurses Licensure Examination. The four-year Bachelor of Science in Nursing Program is community and prevention oriented. Students engage in basic sanitation activities in the community such as the regular free circumcisions in barangays and community fora on health issues.

From 2013 through 2016 Xavier Ateneo, with about 150 nurses per year, had a 100% passing rate on the licensure exam, and has been ranked second among large nursing schools in the Philippines.

==== School of Business and Management ====
The School of Business and Management (formerly 'College of Commerce') is a recognized Center of Excellence with programs in accountancy, real estate management, and business administration (majors in business economics, financial management, marketing management). The Student Entrepreneurship Program is focused on entrepreneurial values, business ethics, environmental stewardship, and corporate social responsibility.

In the 2016 CPA exams, XU ranked sixth nationwide, and from its first class in Real Estate Management 17 of 19 received a passing grade. Its Accountancy and Business & Administration programs are PAASCU Level IV re-accredited, valid until May 2019.

==== School of Education ====
The School of Education was founded in 1938 and reopened in 1947; it trains science, math, and English teachers. The Ignatian Pedagogical Paradigm is used in teaching. Student internships in educational institutions in the region begin as early as sophomore year. Its student council is the Teachers' Guild. Its mascot is the Phoenix.

The school holds a Level III Re-accredited Status granted by PAASCU. CHED has the School of Education as a Center of Excellence. The elementary and secondary education programs are both PAASCU Level IV re-accredited and as a Center of Training Institution for the Department of Education's Certificate and In-Service Education and Training (INSET) Programs.

==== Andrew L Gotianun Sr. Center for Integrated Technologies ====
Unlike the other colleges, the Andrew L. Gotianun Sr. Center for Integrated Technologies (ALGCIT – formerly Center for Industrial Technology) is a technical-vocational school. Its student council is the Center for Integrated Technologies Student Council. Its mascot is the Knight.

Students are involved in entrepreneurial and industrial work. ALGCIT is recognized by the Technical Education and Skills Development Authority (TESDA) and in 1999 recognized by TESDA as a Center for Excellence in Industrial Technician Education. The center offers four three-year programs based on TESDA training regulations. Students who complete the programs are eligible to take the TESDA National Certificate examinations for the qualifications embedded in each program.

ALGCIT was housed at the main campus at Corrales Avenue until 2012 when it moved to the Jose Ch. Alvarez Technology Complex in the Manresa campus.

== Notable people ==
Prominent figures such as the late President Carlos P. Garcia and late President Corazon Aquino were among the people who were conferred an honorary degree by the university. PDP-Laban President Jose Alvarez is a notable alumnus of the university. Former senator Miriam Defensor Santiago was among the distinguished politician who was conferred by the institution as well. The former Vice President Teofisto Guingona Jr. is among the notable alumnus of the university. Influential figures such as Governor Peter M. Unabia, Former Senator Aquilino Q. Pimentel, Jr., Congressman Zia Alonto Adiong, Congressman Rufus B. Rodriguez, and Congressman Yevgeny Vincente "Bambi" B. Emano are among the most prominent alumni of the university. Filipino song artist Arthur Nery, TJ Monterde and distinguished author Jonahmae P. Pacala, also known by her pseudonym Jonaxx, are also alumni of the institution.

== See also ==
- Northern Mindanao
- List of Jesuit educational institutions in the Philippines
- Xavier School
- List of Jesuit sites
