= Bienvenido Nebres =

Filipino priest and mathematician (born 1940)

The Very Reverend Bienvenido F. Nebres, SJ ONS
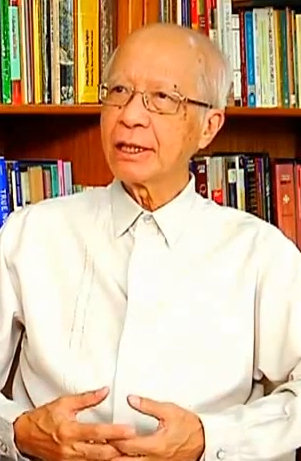
- Nebres in 2012

29th President of the Ateneo de Manila University
- In office April 1, 1993 – June 1, 2011
- Preceded by: Joaquin G. Bernas
- Succeeded by: Jose Ramon Villarin

Personal details
- Born: March 15, 1940 (age 86) Baguio, Commonwealth of the Philippines
- Education: Berchmans College; Stanford University
- Profession: Mathematician; Professor; Jesuit Priest
- Awards: Order of National Scientists of the Philippines (2011)

Bienvenido Florendo Nebres, S.J. (born March 15, 1940) is a Filipino scientist, mathematician, and a Jesuit priest who was the longest-serving university president of the Ateneo de Manila University. He succeeded Joaquin G. Bernas in 1993 and served as University President until 1 June 2011. He currently sits as a member of the board of trustees of Georgetown University, Regis University, St. Edward School Foundation, Inc., the Asian Institute of Management (where he sits as Vice-Chair), and other colleges and universities in the Philippines. He is also a member of the board of directors of Philippine Long Distance Telephone Company, and is currently chairman of the Synergeia Foundation. He was also Provincial Superior of the Society of Jesus in the Philippines.

Nebres served as the Ateneo's university president for more than 18 years. His term was extended for him to lead the Ateneo through the completion of key initiatives as well as its sesquicentennial celebration, and was again extended until June 1, 2011, after which he was succeeded by Jose Ramon Villarin as the Ateneo's university president.

Since his return to the Philippines in 1970 after graduate studies abroad, Nebres has worked on three major areas: teaching and development of mathematics and science in the Philippines and in Southeast Asia; administration in the university and in the Jesuit Order; and leadership in the socio-political concerns of the Philippines during the years of martial law and in the early years of democratic restoration. In the 1990s, he also became more involved in the business world, particularly in the relationships between universities and business and technology.

In 2011, he was named National Scientist of the Philippines upon the recommendation of the National Academy of Science & Technology.

== Early life and education ==
Bienvenido Nebres was born in Baguio on March 15, 1940, and grew up in Bacnotan in La Union, Philippines. He studied at the Bacnotan Elementary School, and then moved to Christ the King College in San Fernando, La Union. His vocation to the priesthood came early, and soon enough he found himself at the Vigan seminary in Ilocos Sur. He wanted to become a priest because of a teacher who was a nun, her stories made him realize that it was a life worth living. He finished high school at the San Jose Seminary, and then moved to the Sacred Heart Novitiate in Novaliches.

He did his early studies in classical studies and philosophy, completing his Bachelor of Arts degree in 1962 and his Master of Arts degree in 1963, both in Philosophy, at the Jesuit Scholasticate, Berchmans College in Cebu City, Philippines. He attended Stanford University in California from 1965 to 1970, wherein he completed his Master of Science and Ph.D. in mathematics. He completed his dissertation "Preservation Theorems and Herbrand Theorems for Infinitary Languages" in 1970 under the supervision of Solomon Feferman.

== Teaching, development of mathematics and science in Southeast Asia ==
Nebres was founding President of the Mathematical Society of the Philippines in 1972. He was one of the founding officers of the Southeast Asian Mathematical Society (SEAMS) also in 1972. The SEAMS has continued activities among the Southeast Asian nations by supporting graduate programs, research, and mathematics education. Nebres was President of the SEAMS 1977-78 during its period of consolidating its network.

Nebres was also one of the founders of the consortium of the leading universities in Manila to develop Ph.D. programs in mathematics, physics and chemistry. The consortium has succeeded in developing a critical mass of scientists in these areas, has developed extensive links with scientists abroad (particularly in Australia and Japan), and is now the core of a large network of schools in the Philippines (more than 110 high schools as well as over 30 colleges and universities) which are supported by the Philippines’ Department of Science and Technology as the leadership group for improving science and engineering education in the country.

From 1992 to 1998, Nebres was Chairman of the Project Advisory Group for a World Bank- and OECF-financed Engineering and Science Education Project of the Philippine Department of Science and Technology. From 1994 to 1998, he directed a team for the Philippine Department of Education on the development of education plans to strengthen elementary and secondary education in the poorest provinces of the country. He has served as Chair of the Technical Panel on Science and Mathematics of the Commission on Higher Education (CHED) since its inception and also chairs the CHED Technical Working Group for faculty development.

In 2012 he became a fellow of the American Mathematical Society.

== As a Jesuit ==
Nebres was dean of the School of Arts and Sciences of the Ateneo de Manila from 1973 to 1980. He was also Rector of the Loyola House of Studies from 1980 to 1982. From 1983 to 1989, he served as Provincial Superior of the Jesuits in the Philippines. Nebres was also President of Xavier University - Ateneo de Cagayan in Cagayan de Oro from 1990 to 1993. He was the longest serving President of the Ateneo de Manila University.

His main concerns apart from the regular duties of a university president are the strengthening of basic education and of science and technology in the Philippines. He currently leads the Ateneo through several key initiatives, such as: basic education development through the Ateneo Center for Educational Development (ACED) and the Ateneo Center for English Language Teaching (ACELT), among other Ateneo initiatives; public health development through the Ateneo's Leaders for Health Program as well as the establishment of the Ateneo School of Medicine and Public Health; housing and social development through leadership in initiatives such as Gawad Kalinga and Kalinga Luzon, where he is one of the key leaders; and leadership and good governance.

On July 28, 2008, Nebres celebrated his 52nd year as a Jesuit.

== Society and politics ==
Nebres also worked to establish the Center for Community Services and the first conscientization and politicalization programs of the Ateneo de Manila in the 1970s. The students from these programs have become major contributors to social development in the Philippines. He also helped in the political programs of various parties and groups during the years of forming alternatives to the Ferdinand Marcos martial law regime. As Provincial Superior of the Jesuits in the Philippines from 1983 to 1989, much of his work was to support and coordinate efforts on the part of the Church in the years prior to and immediately after the People Power Revolution in 1986. In 2006, Nebres merged the Center for Community Services with the Ateneo School of Government.

=== Chair, Presidential Task Force on Education ===
On September 4, 2007, the Presidential Task Force on Education under the Office of the President named Nebres, chairman. Nebres will be joined by 4 others—Angeles University Foundation President Emmanuel Angeles, Philippine Chamber of Commerce and Industry President Donald Dy, Asian Institute of Management Professor Victor Limlingan, and former University of the Philippines president José Abueva. The 5 with Education Secretary Jesli Lapus, Romulo Neri, and Augusto Syjuco, complete the task force. Gloria Macapagal Arroyo signed Executive Order 635 on August 24 creating a presidential task force to assess, plan and monitor the entire educational system.

=== Frontline Leadership ===
On December 5, 2007, Nebres launched "Frontline Leadership," a book project of the Ateneo School of Government (sponsored by German foundation Konrad Adenauer Stiftung) was written by several authors. He stated: "I look forward to the future when the next President of the Philippines does not come from the Senate but from [the ranks of] mayors or governors; I do hope that a next generation of leaders will emerge and see local leadership as the wave of the future." The book narrates the performances of 4 former local officials, an unnamed female governor in the Visayas and one incumbent: Naga Mayor and Ramon Magsaysay awardee Jesse Robredo, former San Fernando, La Union Mayor Mary Jane Ortega, former Bulacan Gov. Josie de la Cruz, and former Surigao del Norte Gov. Robert Lyndon Barbers.

== In business ==
Nebres sits on the boards of several companies as an independent director, most notably that of Philippine Long Distance Telephone Company (PLDT), where he has been a member from 1998 to 2012. His resignation on September 25, 2012, came in the wake of PLDT Chairman Manny Pangilinan's "disengagement" from the Ateneo due to "irreconcilable" differences of positions taken on controversial issues, particularly the Reproductive Health Bill in which the Catholic Church is against, and mining.

== Recognition ==
- In 1981, Nebres was conferred the Ordre des Palmes Académiques for his contributions to the Philippine-French exchange especially in the field of mathematics by the French Republic.
- In 1992, he received an Honorary Doctor of Laws degree from the University of the Philippines for his work in promoting science and technology in the country. He was conferred an Honorary Doctor of Science degree by De La Salle University for his work in science and science education in 2004.
- In 1999, Nebres was inducted into the Alumni Hall of Fame of the Asian Activities Center of Stanford University “for his distinguished accomplishments and outstanding contributions to our community and society.”
- In 2001, Nebres was accorded the rank of Officer in the National Order of Merit of the French Republic (Officier de L'Ordre National du Mérite). The decoration recognises his valuable "contribution to the development of scientific knowledge and education in the Philippines as well as his dedication to the promotion of relations between French and Philippine universities." The award was conferred by decree of the President of the French Republic upon the recommendation of the French Foreign Minister.

Nebres is also an honorary member of Phi Kappa Phi.

The Catholic Bishops Conference of the Philippines (CBCP) on June 15, 2008, stated that "Ateneo de Manila University president Bienvenido Nebres will be formally honored as among the DOST's "50 Men and Women of Science" July to September; the DOST Citation for Nebres described him as an "education icon," having reconciled the fields of science and religion with his work."
