= History of the Ateneo de Manila =

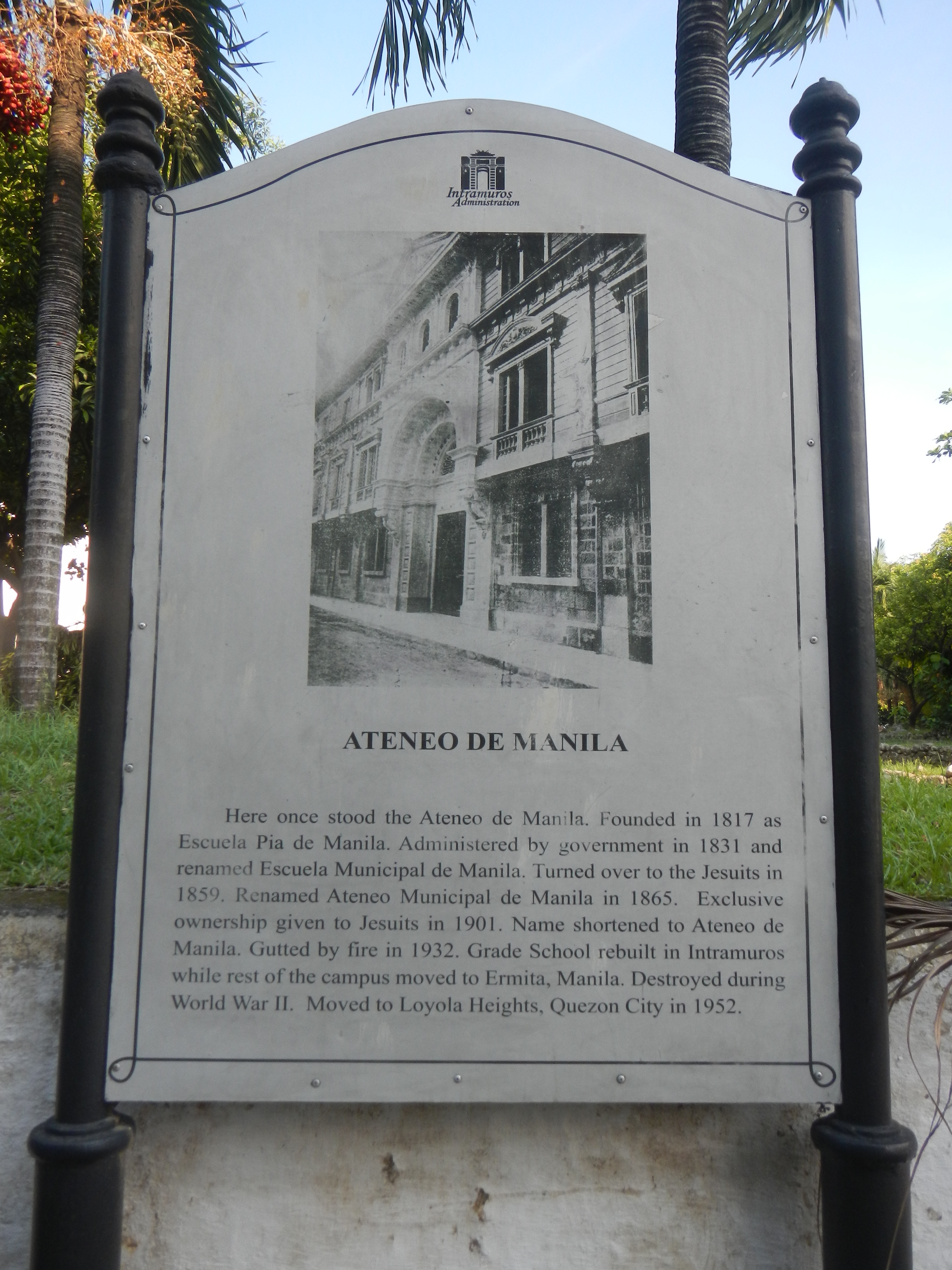
Marker at the original campus of the Ateneo de Manila University in Intramuros, Manila

The Ateneo de Manila University (Filipino: Pamantasang Ateneo de Manila; Spanish: Universidad Ateneo de Manila) is a private research university in Quezon City, Philippines. Founded on December 10, 1859, by the Society of Jesus upon taking over a public elementary school named Escuela Municipal, the Ateneo De Manila is one of the oldest colleges in the Philippines.

== Resistance of the Jesuits under Spanish Rule ==
The Jesuits first established Colegio de San Jose (College of St. Joseph) seminary in 1605 under the colonial province of New Spain, (modern-day Mexico). The Jesuits were later banished from the Philippines in 1768 by royal decree of King Charles III of Spain. The college was then placed under the control of the Dominicans. The Jesuits returned to the Philippines in the 19th century following their expulsion from Spanish lands in the late 18th century, and were tasked with managing a small public school in Manila called the Escuela Municipal in 1859. The mission, which was originally stationed in Mindanao had settled in Manila to take over the school built by Don Pedro de Vivanco in 1816 for indigent Spanish and Filipino boys. It was renamed from Escuela Pia (Charity School) into Escuela Municipal in 1830 by the city government after the former school went into bankruptcy and was completely taken over by the city government. Class under the Jesuits began on December 10, 1859, at the San Ignacio Convent, while the whole campus was being constructed. Later on, it was bestowed authority to grant intermediate or high school degrees, then called the Bachiller en Artes, (Note: This is not the equivalent to modern Bachelor's undergraduate degrees.) renaming Escuela Municipal to the Ateneo Municipal de Manila in 1865, as well as adding new buildings to expand the size of the campus to its final appearance. The school focused on a liberal arts education, by emphasizing on the humanities as it has continued to do in the 20th and 21st century, especially in the classics of Greek and Latin in its manner of instruction.

== 20th century ==
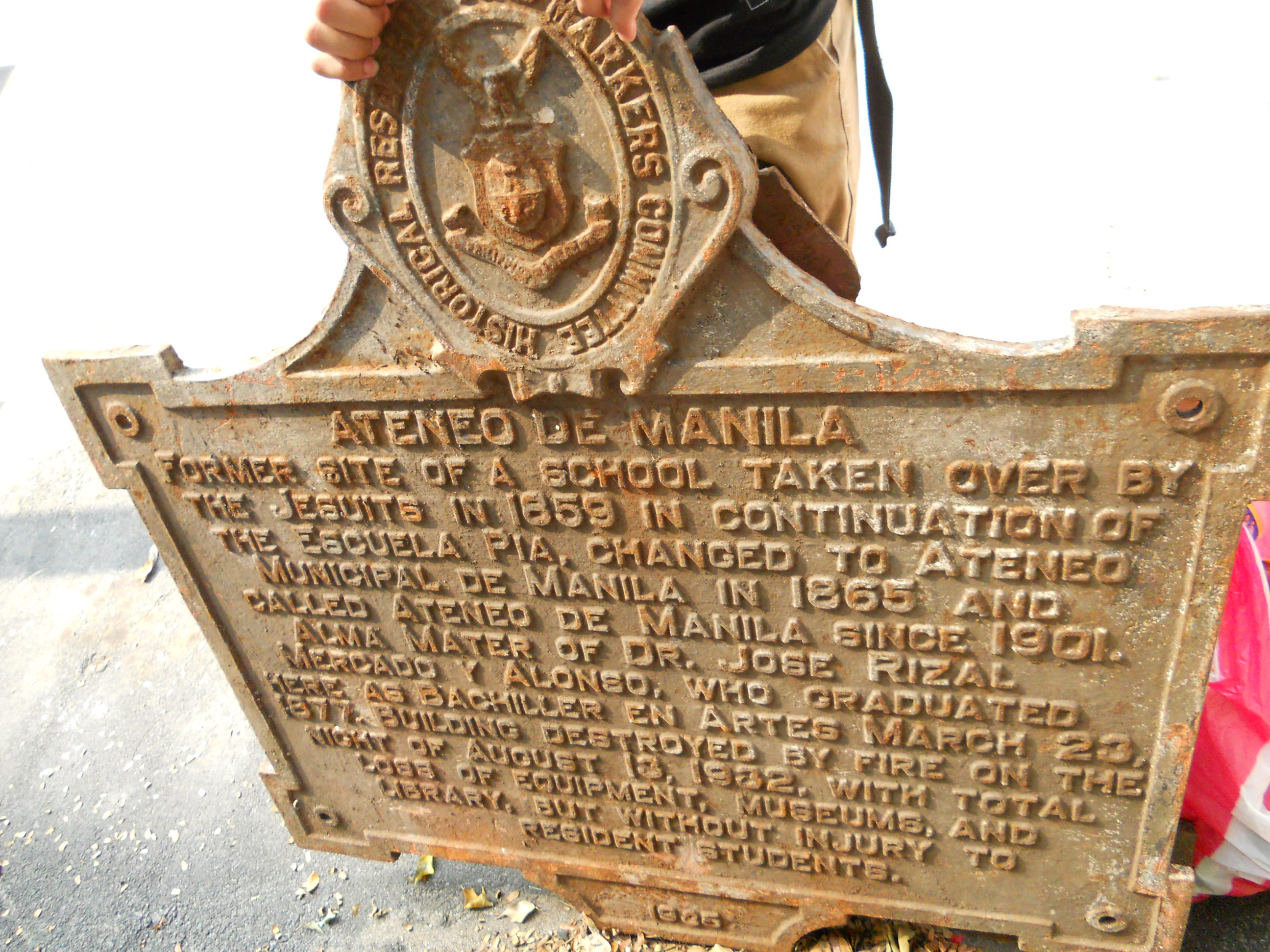
A historical marker formerly installed at the original Ateneo de Manila campus in 1935, currently in storage at the National Historical Commission of the Philippines

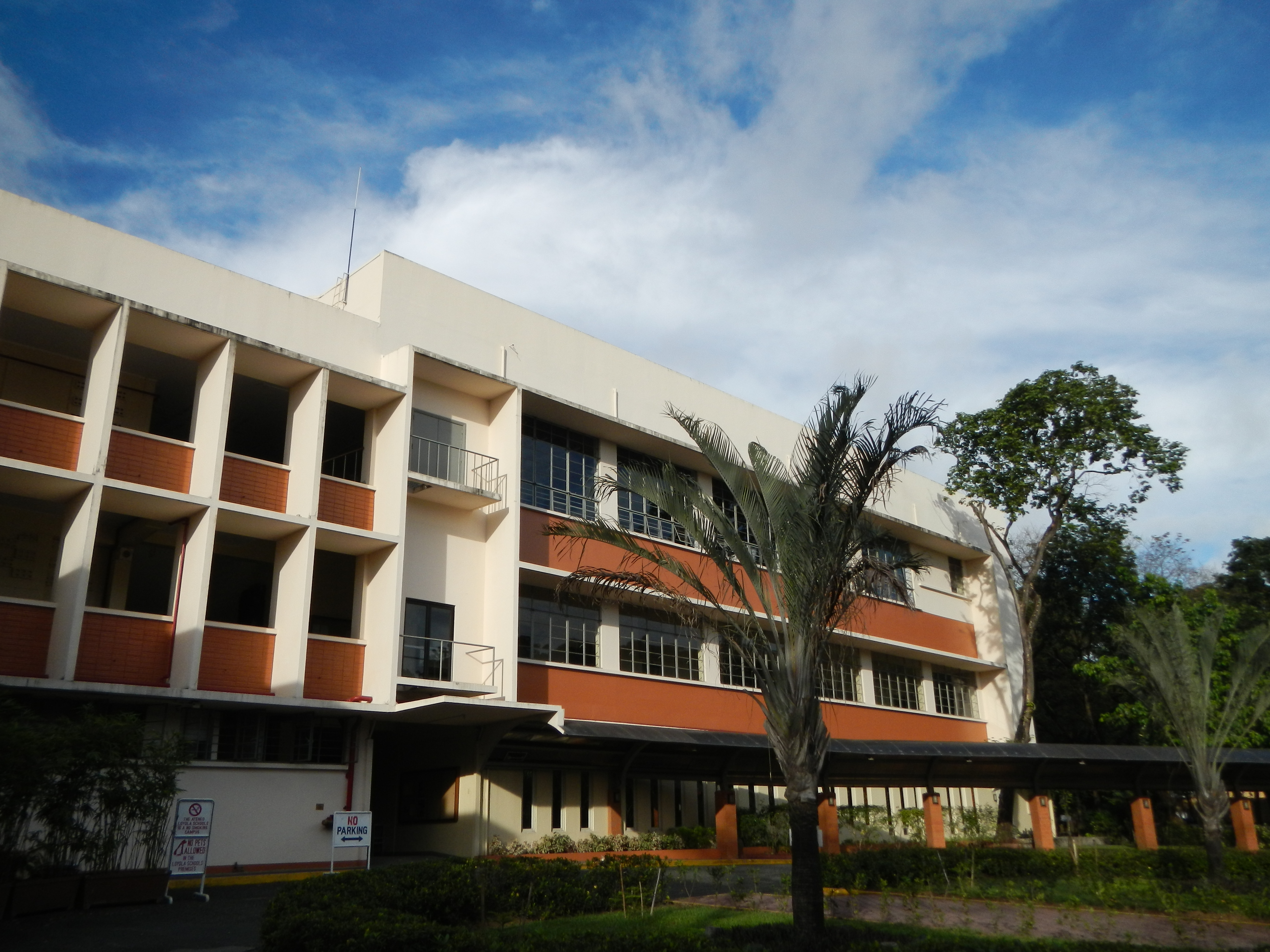
Gonzaga Hall

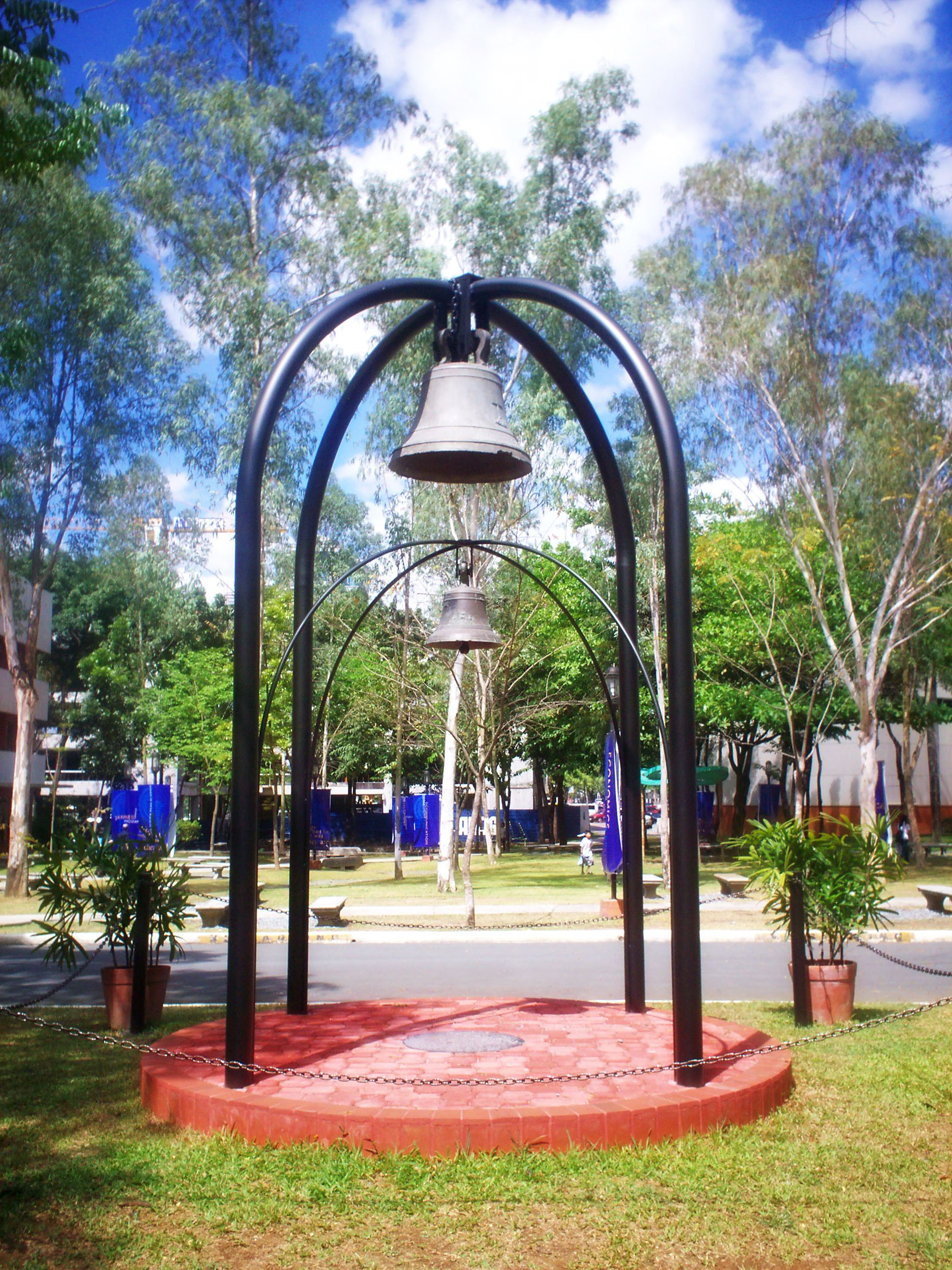
Heritage Bells, the larger cast in 1832, the smaller in 1882, for the Padre Faura campus

Initially situated in Intramuros, the school, which forcibly became privatized in 1902 a year after the start of the full American colonization and defunding took effect, was renamed into the Ateneo de Manila in 1909 to reflect the transition. It offered college courses previously in 1907.

In 1921, the New York province of the Jesuits gradually replaced the Spanish priests. Fr. James Carlin, S.J. later became the first provincial superior and completely replaced the province of Aragon with the New York-Maryland Province, displacing Spanish priests and teachers except those teaching Spanish and Latin subjects. The campus at this point had added its iconic hardwood entrance door with the words AMDG or Ad Majorem Dei Gloriam (For the Greater Glory of God), designed by alumnus Isabelo Tampinco in the same decade. On August 13, 1932, the original campus was destroyed by fire. Other completely burned buildings in the Intramuros fire included Jesuit Emn's College, and the Santa Isabel Catholic Girl's College. The damages costed $2,500,000 at the time.

The Ateneo campus moved to Padre Faura Street, Ermita, Manila as suggested by Fr. Richard O'Brien, S.J. However, the new campus was then destroyed during the Battle of Manila by Japanese forces in 1945. It was replaced by quonset huts before the greater student community moved into Katipunan Avenue in 1952. The Padre Faura campus remained home to the Law School until 1977, and was later sold to the Robinsons Retail in 1980 to build a commercial establishment.

=== Post-WWII and the late 20th century ===
The following decades saw escalating turbulence engulf the university as an active movement for Filipinization and a growing awareness of the vast gulf between rich and poor gripped the nation. Throughout the 1960s, Ateneans pushed for an Ateneo which was more conversant with the Filipino situation and rooted more deeply in Filipino values. They pushed for the use of Filipino for instruction, and for the university to implement reforms that addressed the growing social problems of poverty and injustice. During that time, the Graduate School split into the Graduate School of Arts and Sciences and the Graduate School of Economics and Business Administration, which eventually became the Graduate School of Business.

In 1965, Fr. Horacio de la Costa became the first Filipino Provincial Superior of the Philippine Province of the Society of Jesus. On September 25, 1969, Pacifico Ortiz, S.J., was installed as the first Filipino president of the Ateneo de Manila.

Ateneans also played a vital role together with student organizations from other prominent colleges and universities as student activism rose in academe in the 1970s. Students faced university expulsion and violent government dispersal as they protested the dismissal of dissenting faculty and students, oppressive laws and price hikes, human rights violations, and other injustices. On September 21, 1972, Philippine President Ferdinand Marcos declared martial law. The university administration had great difficulty reconciling the promotion of social justice and keeping the university intact. They locked down on the more overt expressions of activism—violence and miltancy—and strove to maintain a semblance of normalcy as they sought to keep military men from being stationed on campus. In 1973, Jesuit Superior General Fr. Pedro Arrupe called for Jesuit schools to educate for justice and to form "men and women for others." The Ateneo college opened its doors to its first female students in that same year.

The Graduate School of Arts and Sciences moved to Loyola Heights in 1976, and the Padre Faura campus finally closed in 1977 as the Graduate School of Business and the School of Law moved to H.V. de la Costa St. in Salcedo Village, Makati. That same year, the Ateneo men's basketball, left the NCAA, which it co-founded, due to violence plaguing the league. In 1978 the Ateneo joined the University Athletic Association of the Philippines. In February 1978, Ateneo opened the Ateneo-Univac Computer Technology Center, one of the country's pioneering computer centers, which later became the Ateneo Computer Technology Center.

On August 21, 1983, Ateneo alumnus Senator Ninoy Aquino, was assassinated upon his return from exile in the United States. Ateneans continued to work with sectors such as the poor, non-government organizations, and some activist groups in the dying years of the martial law era. On February 11, 1986, alumnus and Antique Governor Evelio Javier was gunned down. Two weeks later, Ateneans joined thousands of Filipinos from all walks of life in the peaceful uprising at EDSA which ousted Ferdinand Marcos.

In 1991, the Ateneo joined in relief operations to help victims of the eruption of Mount Pinatubo. That same year saw the School of Law replace its Bachelor of Laws degree with the Juris Doctor degree.

In 1996, the Ateneo relaunched the Ateneo Computer Technology Center as the Ateneo Information Technology Institute and established the Ateneo School of Government. In 1998, the Ateneo's Rockwell campus, which currently houses the Ateneo Graduate School of Business and the Ateneo School of Law, was completed in Rockwell Center in Bel-Air, Makati. The Science Education Complex was completed in the Loyola Heights campus.

== 21st century to the present ==
Since the 21st century, the Ateneo de Manila has changed the curriculum of its colleges to adapt to modern challenges. Moreover, it has answered and called for more progressive societal positions such as on gender inclusivity and other anti-discrimination issues, and in so doing has changed the status of its schools to co-educational institutions, opening to female senior high school students in school year 2016–17. Later on in 2024, the school allowed female students in all levels, and should be completely covered by male and female students in all levels by 2030.

=== 21st century reforms ===
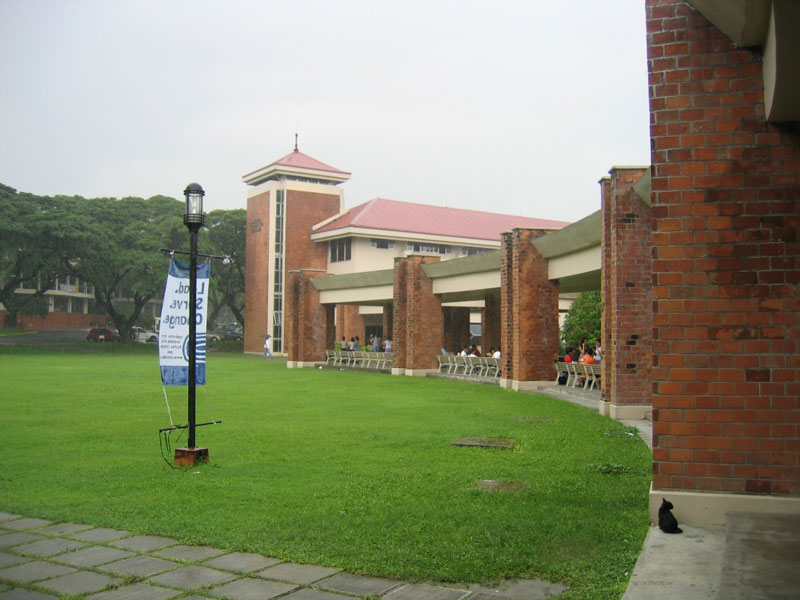
The Science Education Complex

In 2000, the School of Arts and Sciences which comprised the college and the Graduate School restructured into four Loyola Schools: the School of Humanities, the John Gokongwei School of Management or the current business school, the School of Science and Engineering, and the School of Social Sciences. The Moro Lorenzo Sports Complex was completed in the Loyola Heights campus. Midway through that year, high school alumnus and Philippine President Joseph Estrada faced grave corruption charges connected with economic plunder and jueteng, an illegal numbers game. The university hosted KOMPIL II and other organizations and movements in its Loyola Heights and Makati campuses. Members of the university community participated in the Jericho March at the Senate and other mass actions. On January 20, 2001, Ateneo alumna and former economics faculty member Gloria Macapagal Arroyo was sworn in as the 14th President of the Philippines, overthrowing Estrada after top military officers withdrew support from him as commander in chief.

In April 2002, the office of the University President established Pathways to Higher Education-Philippines, one of the university's outreach initiatives, with the help of the Ford and Synergeia Foundations. On July 31, the feast of St. Ignatius, the university Church of the Gesù was completed in the Loyola Heights campus and was consecrated by Cardinal Jaime Sin.

In 2003, the Ateneo partnered with Gawad Kalinga in its first formal, university-wide social action program. Also, in response to the typhoons and flooding that devastated most of the Philippine Island of Luzon in November 2004, Ateneo launched Task Force Noah which has continued to contribute to disaster relief and rehabilitation efforts in areas that include Calatagan in Mindoro and Guinsaugon in Southern Leyte. Also in 2004 the Ateneo earned the highest possible accreditation status, Level IV, from the FAAP and the Philippine Accrediting Association of Schools, Colleges and Universities (PAASCU), and the Ateneo celebrated the 145th anniversary of its founding and of the Jesuits' return to the Philippines, even as plans began for its sesquicentennial in 2009.

As typhoon relief efforts wound down in January 2005, the Ateneo, Gawad Kalinga, and other partners launched Kalinga Luzon (KL), a program dedicated to the long-term rehabilitation of typhoon-stricken communities in Luzon. In light of the political crisis sparked by allegations of President Arroyo's cheating in the 2004 presidential elections, The Ateneo de Manila in 2005 established the Social Involvement Workshops and other fora. Ateneo also established more tie-ups and foreign linkages, and began preparation for the Leong Center for Chinese Studies in the university.

In early 2006, members of the Ateneo de Manila University and affiliated Jesuit institutions were part of movements calling for discernment, action, and sustainable solutions to the deeply divisive political issues that continue to rock Filipino society. The Ateneo de Manila University also intensified its social development efforts, launching Kalinga Leyte, a program for the long-term rehabilitation of Southern Leyte, with its GK partners. It expanded the scope of its involvement with Gawad Kalinga, supporting new initiatives throughout Nueva Ecija and in other provinces such as Cotabato and Quezon province.

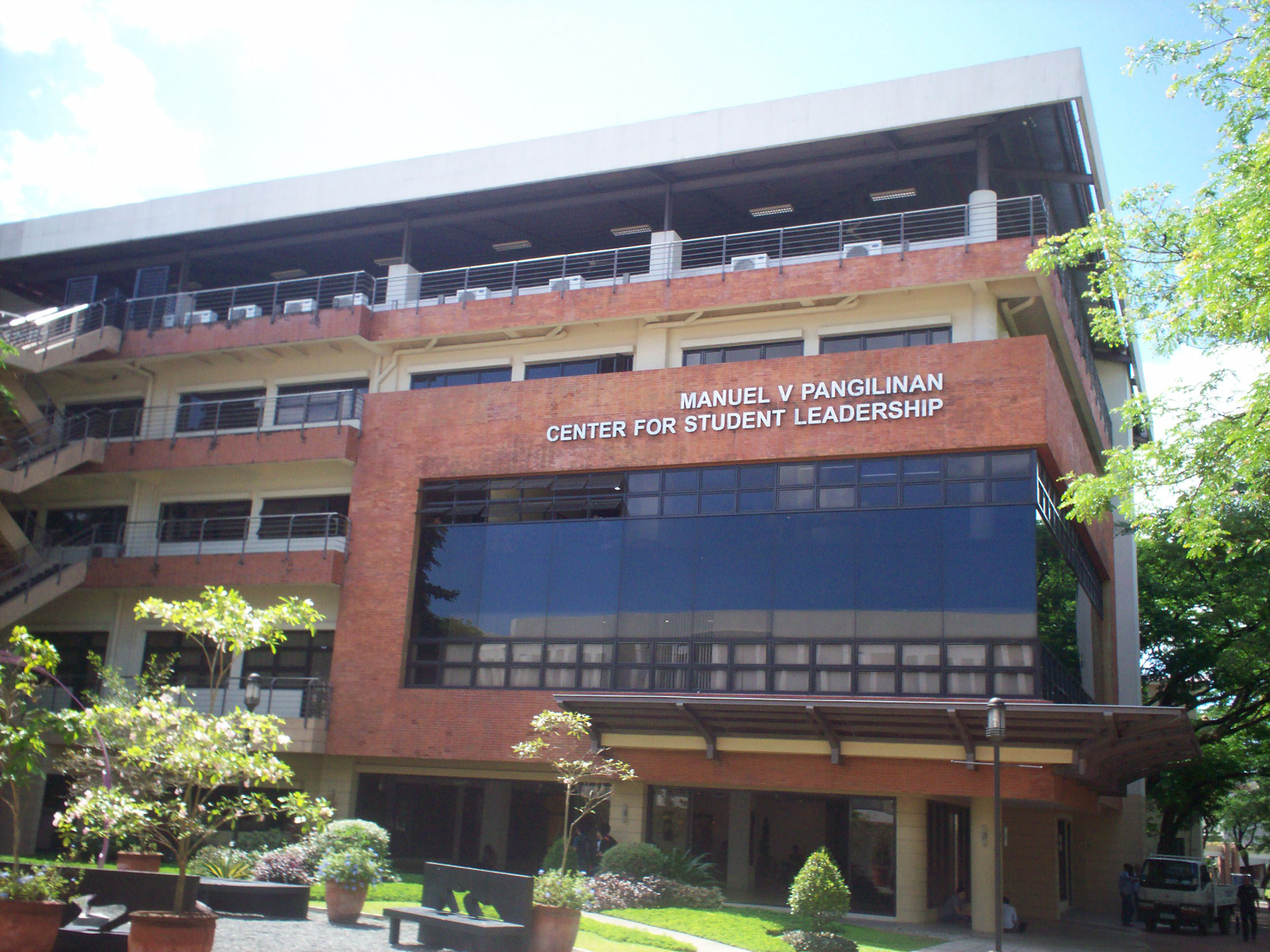
Pangilinan Center for Student Leadership

Midway through 2006, the Manuel V Pangilinan Center for Student Leadership was completed. The university also had ground-breaking for several projects: the Ricardo Leong Hall to house several units of the Loyola Schools' School of Social Sciences, the Confucius Institute for Chinese Studies, and the Ateneo School of Medicine and Public Health facility in Ortigas. In December, the Ateneo launched AGAP-Bikol in cooperation with other Jesuit-affiliated and civil society groups, in response to the devastation wrought by typhoons in the Bicol area.

In October 2008, 66 faculty members from different departments, including members of the Theology Department, challenged the position of the Catholic Bishops Conference of the Philippines (CBCP) on the Reproductive Health Bill pending before the Philippine Congress, and declared that Catholics can support the RH bill in good conscience. The bill would encourage the use of contraceptives to bring down the large number of abortions in the country. University President Fr. Bienvenido Nebres, S.J., explained that their position was not an official position of the university but that these faculty members had a right to express their views as individual Catholics and that there should be continuing efforts on the critical study and discussion of the bill among Church groups, at the university and in civil society. The Ateneo High School was granted Level III accreditation by the PAASCU, the highest possible level in the country together with a few other private institutions. In September and October 2009, students from the university organised Task Force Ondoy in response to Typhoon Ketsana. The task force conducted relief operations in various areas struck hard by the typhoon, particularly in Marikina.

In May 2011, the university was granted Level IV Re-Accredited Status and Institutional Accreditation by the Commission on Higher Education (CHED) through the Federation of Accrediting Agencies of the Philippines (FAAP) and the Philippine Accrediting Association of Schools, Colleges and Universities (PAASCU), the first time that both citations were awarded to a university simultaneously. In 2011 Fr. Bienvenido Nebres, S.J., retired from the presidency of the Ateneo and was succeeded by Fr. Jose Ramon T. Villarin, S.J. On November 25, 2011, the Philippine Accrediting Association of Schools, Colleges and Universities (PAASCU) awarded the Ateneo de Manila Loyola Schools Level IV Re-accreditation for 21 academic programmemes as well as Institutional Accreditation. In October 2022, the university announced another round of restructuring that merged the Loyola Schools and Ateneo Professional Schools into one single higher education unit starting the following school year.

=== Incidents ===
On July 24, 2022, a former mayor of Lamitan, Basilan, and two others were killed. As a result, the scheduled graduation ceremonies of the university's law school was cancelled.

== See also ==
- Ateneo de Manila University
- Notable alumni of the Ateneo de Manila
- Culture and traditions of the Ateneo de Manila
- Ateneo Blue Eagles
- List of Ateneo de Manila University people
