= Charles Roland =

Charles Roland may refer to:

- Charles Gordon Roland (1933–2009), Canadian physician and historian
- Charles P. Roland (born 1918), American historian and professor
