= Charles Gordon Roland =

Canadian medical historian (1933–2009)

Charles Gordon Roland (January 25, 1933 – June 9, 2009) was a Canadian medical historian. Roland's publications and public lectures consisted of history and bibliography, medical communications, and medicine, particularly Canadian medical history in the 19th century, the influence of William Osler, and on military medicine. Many of his research materials related to Osler are held at the Osler Library of the History of Medicine at McGill University. His research interests focused on medical aspects of World War II, culminating in two books on the Warsaw Ghetto and on Canadian prisoners of war of the Japanese in the Far East.

== Early life ==
Charles Gordon Roland was born in Winnipeg, Manitoba to Jack and Leona Roland. Roland spent his early years at God's Lake, 603 kilometres north of Winnipeg, where his father was the mine accountant. He had his own dogsled team to take him to the one-room schoolhouse. When the school closed, he was sent to board with a family in Flin Flon, Manitoba to finish his schooling. In his final year of high school, his father entered a Toronto sanitarium for tuberculosis and the family relocated to be near him. Roland completed high school at Toronto's Oakwood Collegiate.

With savings from his many jobs and financial aid from a Toronto doctor, he was able to attend the University of Toronto. There he met and married Marjorie Kyles. After graduation, they went to Winnipeg where he entered the University of Manitoba medical school. He earned university tuition by working as a bellhop at Chateau Lake Louise in Alberta where he became a mountain climber. He was heavily involved in the rescue of three Mexican climbers stuck on a glacier after four of their friends fell to their death.
In 1958, Dr. Roland graduated M.D., BSc. (Medicine) from the University of Manitoba.

After internship at St. Boniface Hospital, Roland began general practice in Tillsonburg, Ontario in 1958 and then a year later with a practice in Grimsby, Ontario.

== Career ==
In 1964, Roland took a position at the Journal of the American Medical Association, based in Chicago and taught the history of medicine at Northwestern University. This was followed by nearly ten years at the Mayo Clinic in Rochester, Minnesota, where he helped start their medical school, taught medical history, overhauled the Mayo Clinic Proceedings, and chaired the newly created Department of Biomedical Communications.

In 1977, McMaster University recruited him as its inaugural Hannah Professor of the History of Medicine at its new medical school.

He was involved in editing the Canadian Bulletin of Medical History. He served as president of the American Osler Society and the Canadian Society for the History of Medicine. He retired from his university post in 1999 but continued to research and write. He was a Curator of the Osler Library at McGill University for many years and a noted Oslerian.

Roland started to research important events and people in medicine at a time when history did not exist as a branch of medicine. "He more than anyone else basically invented Canadian medical history as a field," said Jacalyn Duffin, a medical doctor and Hannah Professor of the History of Medicine at Queen's University. He has been lauded as an "outstanding Oslerian scholar" and a "master" Oslerian scholar.

He pioneered work in recording oral history. With the advent of the tape recorder, he interviewed aging scientists about their lives, work and discoveries.

== Awards and honors ==
Roland was elected to the presidency of the American Medical Writer's Association, 1969–1970, the Medical Historical Club of Toronto, 1977–1978, the American Osler Society, 1986–1987, and the Canadian Society for the History of Medicine, 1993-1997. He also received an honorary doctorate from the University of Manitoba and the prestigious John McGovern Medal from Oxford University.

== Bibliography ==
- Roland, Charles G., Courage Under Siege: Starvation, Disease, and Death in the Warsaw Ghetto, Oxford University Press, 1992.
- Roland, Charles G., Long Night's Journey Into Day: Prisoners of War in Hong Kong and Japan, 1941–1945, Wilfrid Laurier University Press, 2001.
- Roland, Charles G., "Noted Surgeon, Fine Citizen: The Life of Archibald E. Malloch, M.D. 1844-1919, Osler Library Studies in the History of Medicine, No 11, 2008.
- Golden, Richard L. and Roland, Charles G., editors, Sir William Osler: An Annotated Bibliography with Illustrations, Norman Publishing, 1988.
- Nation, Earl F., Roland, Charles G., and McGovern, John P., editors, An Annotated Checklist of Osleriana, The Kent State University Press, 1976.
- McGovern, John P. and Roland, Charles G., editors, The Collected Essays of Sir William Osler, Volumes I-III, The Classics of Medicine Library, 1985.
- Roland, Charles G., editor, Good Scientific Writing: An Anthology, American Medical Association, 1971.
- Roland, Charles G., "An Underground Medical School in the Warsaw Ghetto, 1941-2," Medical History, Vol. 33, 1989.
- Roland, Charles G (2010). "The Use of Medical Evidence in British Trials of Suspected Japanese War Criminals". Canadian Bulletin of Medical History. 27 (2).
- Roland, Charles G. Secondary sources in the history of Canadian medicine. Vol. 1 (1984) and Vol 2 2000. Available online at Our Roots.
