= O Canada =

National anthem of Canada

- Official bilingual sheet music
- National anthem of Canada
- Also known as: French: Ô Canada
- Lyrics: Adolphe-Basile Routhier (French, 1880), Robert Stanley Weir (English, 1908)
- Music: Calixa Lavallée, 1880
- Adopted: July 1, 1980

Audio sample
- Instrumental rendition by the Royal Canadian Navy's National Band of the Naval Reserve in E-flat major: file; help

"O Canada" (French: "Ô Canada") is the national anthem of Canada. The song was originally commissioned by Lieutenant Governor of Quebec Théodore Robitaille for the 1880 Saint-Jean-Baptiste Day ceremony; Calixa Lavallée composed the music, after which French-language words were written by the poet and judge Sir Adolphe-Basile Routhier.

The original French lyrics were translated to English in 1906. Multiple English versions ensued, with Robert Stanley Weir's 1908 version (which was not a translation of the French lyrics) gaining the most popularity; the Weir lyrics eventually served as the basis for the official lyrics enacted by Parliament. Weir's English-language lyrics have been revised three times, most recently when An Act to amend the National Anthem Act (gender) was enacted in 2018. The French lyrics remain unaltered.

"O Canada" had served as a de facto national anthem since 1939, officially becoming the country's national anthem in 1980 when Canada's National Anthem Act received royal assent and became effective on July 1 as part of that year's Dominion Day (today's Canada Day) celebrations.

== Melody ==
"O Canada" is a 28-bar song in 4/4 time, to be played "maestoso è risoluto" ("majestic and resolved"). The original manuscript has been lost.

== Lyrics ==
The National Anthem Act established set lyrics for "O Canada" in Canada's two official languages, English and French. However, the two sets of lyrics are not translations of each other.

The lyrics are as follows:

English lyrics
O Canada!
Our home and native land!
True patriot love in all of us command.
With glowing hearts we see thee rise,
The True North strong and free!
From far and wide,
O Canada, we stand on guard for thee.
God keep our land glorious and free!
𝄆 O Canada, we stand on guard for thee. 𝄇

French lyrics
Ô Canada!
Terre de nos aïeux,
Ton front est ceint de fleurons glorieux!
Car ton bras sait porter l'épée,
Il sait porter la croix!
Ton histoire est une épopée
Des plus brillants exploits.
Et ta valeur, de foi trempée,
𝄆 Protégera nos foyers et nos droits. 𝄇

Translation by the parliamentary Translation Bureau
O Canada!
Land of our ancestors
Glorious deeds circle your brow
For your arm knows how to wield the sword
Your arm knows how to carry the cross;
Your history is an epic
Of brilliant deeds
And your valour steeped in faith
𝄆 Will protect our homes and our rights. 𝄇

Bilingual version 1
O Canada!
Our home and native land!
True patriot love in all of us command.
Car ton bras sait porter l'épée,
Il sait porter la croix!
Ton histoire est une épopée
Des plus brillants exploits.
God keep our land glorious and free!
𝄆 O Canada, we stand on guard for thee. 𝄇

Bilingual version 2
Ô Canada!
Terre de nos aïeux,
Ton front est ceint de fleurons glorieux!
Car ton bras sait porter l'épée,
Il sait porter la croix!
Ton histoire est une épopée
Des plus brillants exploits.
God keep our land glorious and free!
𝄆 O Canada, we stand on guard for thee. 𝄇

1928 orchestral and vocal recording in English (two verses)
Edward Johnson singing Weir's original lyrics

1918 orchestral and vocal recording in French (two verses)
First and fourth verses sung by the Quatuor Octave Pelletier

1916 band instrumental recording (three verses)
Performed by the Victor Military Band

1927 bell tower instrumental recording (two verses) (followed by "God Save the King")
Performed by Percival Price using carillon bell at the Peace Tower in Ottawa

"O Canada"
Sung by Henry Burr in 1914

The line "The True North strong and free" is based on Lord Tennyson's description of Canada as "that true North, whereof we lately heard / A strain to shame us". In the context of Tennyson's poem To the Queen, the word true means "loyal" or "faithful".

The lyrics and melody of "O Canada" are both in the public domain, a status unaffected by the trademarking of the phrases "with glowing hearts" and "des plus brillants exploits" for the 2010 Winter Olympics in Vancouver. Two provinces have adopted Latin translations of phrases from the English lyrics as their mottos: Manitoba—Gloriosus et Liber (Glorious and Free)—and Alberta—Fortis et Liber (Strong and Free). Similarly, the Canadian Army's motto is Vigilamus pro te (we stand on guard for thee).

=== Translations ===
The lyrics have been translated into several indigenous languages of Canada, including Inuktitut, Ojibwe, Cree and Mi'kmaq. There is also a trilingual version, in English, French and Inuktitut.

=== Second, third and fourth stanzas: historical refrain ===
A page from Hymns of the Christian Life, 1962, depicting then long-standing refrain lyrics to "O Canada", but not the original

Below are the second, third and fourth stanzas.

2. O Canada! Where pines and maples grow.
Great prairies spread and lordly rivers flow.
How dear to us thy broad domain,
From East to Western sea.
Thou land of hope for all who toil!
Thou True North, strong and free!

Chorus
God keep our land glorious and free!
𝄆 O Canada, we stand on guard for thee. 𝄇

3. O Canada! Beneath thy shining skies
May stalwart sons, and gentle maidens rise,
To keep thee steadfast through the years
From East to Western sea.
Our own beloved native land!
Our True North, strong and free!

Chorus

4. Ruler supreme, who hearest humble prayer,
Hold our Dominion within thy loving care;
Help us to find, O God, in thee
A lasting, rich reward,
As waiting for the better Day,
We ever stand on guard.

Chorus

=== Original French version ===
The first verse is the same. The other verses follow.

2. Sous l'œil de Dieu, près du fleuve géant,
Le Canadien grandit en espérant.
Il est né d'une race fière,
Béni fut son berceau.
Le ciel a marqué sa carrière
Dans ce monde nouveau.
Toujours guidé par sa lumière,
𝄆 Il gardera l'honneur de son drapeau. 𝄇

3. De son patron, précurseur du vrai Dieu,
Il porte au front l'auréole de feu.
Ennemi de la tyrannie
Mais plein de loyauté,
Il veut garder dans l'harmonie,
Sa fière liberté;
Et par l'effort de son génie,
𝄆 Sur notre sol asseoir la vérité. 𝄇

4. Amour sacré du trône et de l'autel,
Remplis nos cœurs de ton souffle immortel!
Parmi les races étrangères,
Notre guide est la loi :
Sachons être un peuple de frères,
Sous le joug de la foi.
Et répétons, comme nos pères,
𝄆 Le cri vainqueur : « Pour le Christ et le roi! » 𝄇

Under the eye of God, near the giant river,
The Canadian grows hoping.
He was born of a proud race,
Blessed was his birthplace.
Heaven has noted his career
In this new world.
Always guided by its light,
𝄆 He will keep the honour of his flag. 𝄇

From his patron, the precursor of the true God,
He wears the halo of fire on his brow.
Enemy of tyranny
But full of loyalty,
He wants to keep in harmony,
His proud freedom;
And by the effort of his genius,
𝄆 Set on our ground the truth. 𝄇

Sacred love of the throne and the altar,
Fill our hearts with your immortal breath!
Among the foreign races,
Our guide is the law:
Let us know how to be a people of brothers,
Under the yoke of faith.
And repeat, like our fathers,
𝄆 The battle cry: "For Christ and King!" 𝄇

== History ==
The French lyrics of "O Canada" were written by Sir Adolphe-Basile Routhier, to music composed by Calixa Lavallée, as a French Canadian patriotic song for the Saint-Jean-Baptiste Society and first performed on June 24, 1880, at a Saint-Jean-Baptiste Day banquet in Quebec City. At that time, the "Chant National", also by Routhier, was popular amongst Francophones as an anthem, while "God Save the Queen" and "The Maple Leaf Forever" had, since 1867, been competing as unofficial national anthems in English Canada. "O Canada" joined that fray when a group of school children sang it for the 1901 tour of Canada by the Duke and Duchess of Cornwall (later King George V and Queen Mary). This was the first known performance of the song outside Quebec.

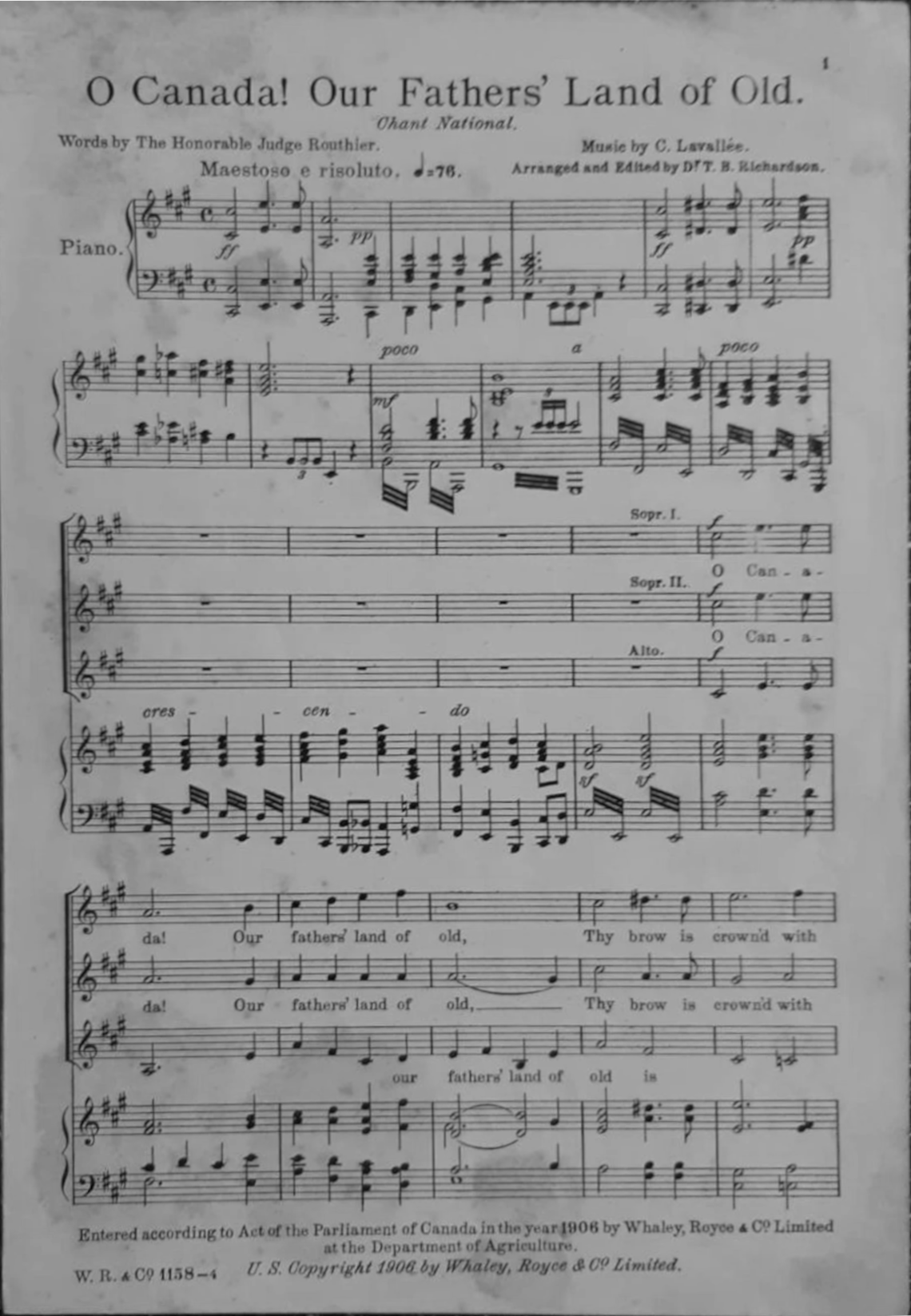
Sheet music for an English-language version of "O Canada" published in 1906

Five years later, the Whaley and Royce company in Toronto published the music with the French text and a first translation into English by Thomas Bedford Richardson and, in 1908, Collier's Weekly magazine held a competition to write new English lyrics for "O Canada". The competition was won by Mercy E. Powell McCulloch, but her version never gained wide acceptance. In fact, many made English translations of Routhier's words; however, the most popular version was created in 1908 by Robert Stanley Weir, a lawyer and Recorder of the City of Montreal. Weir's lyrics from 1908 contained no religious references and used the phrase "thou dost in us command" before they were changed by Weir in 1913 to read "in all thy sons command". In 1926, a fourth verse of a religious nature was added. A slightly modified version was officially published for the Diamond Jubilee of Confederation in 1927, and gradually it became the most widely accepted and performed version of this song.

The tune was thought to have become the de facto national anthem after King George VI remained at attention during its playing at the dedication of the National War Memorial in Ottawa, Ontario, on May 21, 1939; though George was actually following a precedent set by his brother, Edward, the previous king of Canada, when he dedicated the Canadian National Vimy Memorial in France in 1936. By-laws and practices governing the use of song during public events in municipalities varied; in Toronto, "God Save the King" or "God Save the Queen" was employed, while in Montreal it was "O Canada".

Musicologist Ross Duffin has argued that Lavallée constructed the melody for "O Canada" by adapting material by Mozart ("March of the Priests" from The Magic Flute, measures 1–8), Wagner ("Wach auf, es nahet gen den Tag" from Die Meistersinger von Nürnberg, measures 9–16), Liszt (Festklänge, measures 17–20), and Matthias Keller ("The American Hymn", measures 21–28).

=== Adoption ===
Prime Minister Lester B. Pearson in 1964 said one song would have to be chosen as the country's national anthem and the government resolved to form a joint committee to review the status of the two musical works. The next year, Pearson put to the House of Commons a motion that "the government be authorized to take such steps as may be necessary to provide that 'O Canada' shall be the National Anthem of Canada while 'God Save the Queen' shall be the Royal Anthem of Canada", of which parliament approved. In 1967, the Prime Minister advised Governor General Georges Vanier to appoint the Special Joint Committee of the Senate and House of Commons on the National and Royal Anthems; the group first met in February and, within two months, on April 12, 1967, presented its conclusion that "O Canada" should be designated as the national anthem and "God Save the Queen" as the royal anthem of Canada, one verse from each, in both official languages, to be adopted by parliament. The group was then charged with establishing official lyrics for each song. For "O Canada", the Robert Stanley Weir version of 1908 was recommended for the English words, with a few minor changes: two of the "stand on guard" phrases were replaced with "from far and wide" and "God keep our land".

In 1970, the Queen in Right of Canada purchased the right to the lyrics and music of "O Canada" from Gordon V. Thompson Music for $1. The song finally became the official national anthem in 1980 with the passage of the National Anthem Act. The Act replaced two of the repetitions of the phrase "We stand on guard" in the English lyrics, as had been proposed by the Senate Special Joint Committee. This change was controversial with traditionalists and, for several years afterwards, it was not uncommon to hear people still singing the old lyrics at public events. In contrast, the French lyrics are unchanged from the original version.

=== Inclusive language debates ===
In June 1990, Toronto City Council voted 12 to 7 in favour of recommending to the Canadian government that the phrase "our home and native land" be changed to "our home and cherished land" and that "in all thy sons command" be partly reverted to "in all of us command". Councillor Howard Moscoe said that the words "native land" were not appropriate for the many Canadians who were not native-born and that the word "sons" implied "that women can't feel true patriotism or love for Canada". Senator Vivienne Poy similarly criticized the English lyrics of the anthem as being sexist and she introduced a bill in 2002 proposing to change the phrase "in all thy sons command" to "in all of us command". In the late 2000s, the anthem's religious references (to God in English and to the Christian cross in French) were criticized by secularists.

In the speech from the throne delivered by Governor General Michaëlle Jean on March 3, 2010, a plan to have parliament review the "original gender-neutral wording of the national anthem" was announced. However, three-quarters of Canadians polled after the speech objected to the proposal and, two days later, the prime minister's office announced that the cabinet had decided not to change the original lyrics.

In another attempt to make the anthem gender-neutral, Liberal MP Mauril Bélanger introduced a private member's bill in September 2014. His Bill C-624, An Act to amend the National Anthem Act (gender), was defeated at second reading in April 2015. Following the 2015 federal election, Bélanger reintroduced the bill in the new parliament as Bill C-210 in January 2016. In June 2016, the bill passed its third reading with a vote of 225 to 74 in the House of Commons. The bill passed its third reading in the Senate with a voice vote on January 31, 2018, and received royal assent on February 7, 2018.

== Performances ==
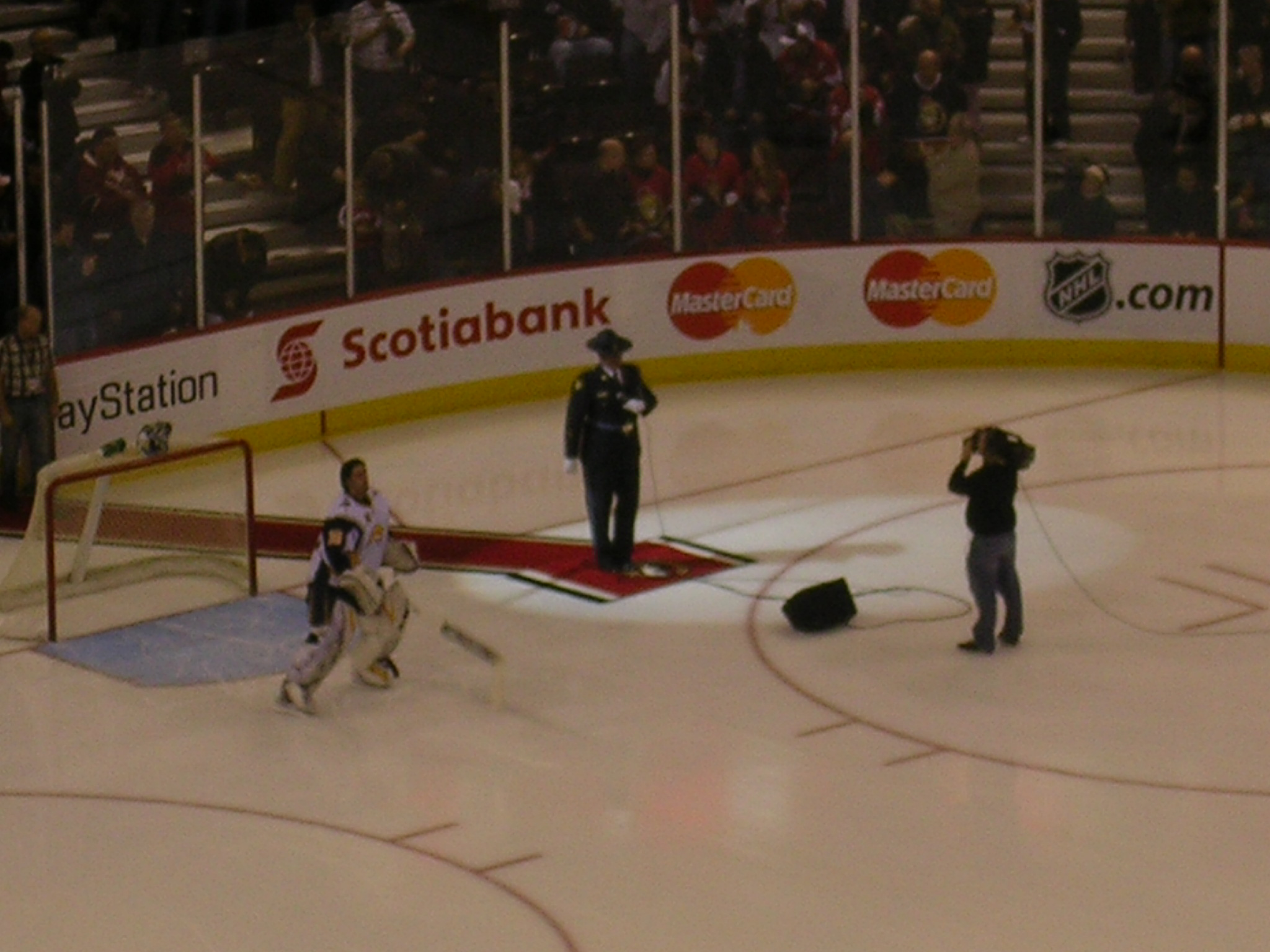
Lyndon Slewidge singing "O Canada" prior to a Ottawa Senators game

"O Canada" is routinely played before sporting events involving Canadian teams. Singers at such public events often mix the English and French lyrics to represent Canada's linguistic duality. Other linguistic variations have also been performed: During the opening ceremonies of the 1988 Winter Olympics in Calgary, "O Canada" was sung in the Southern Tutchone language by Yukon native Daniel Tlen. At a National Hockey League (NHL) game in Calgary, in February 2007, Cree singer Akina Shirt became the first person to perform "O Canada" in the Cree language at such an event.

Major League Baseball, Major League Soccer, the National Basketball Association, and the NHL all require venues to perform both the Canadian and American national anthems at games that involve teams from both countries (including all-star games), with the away team's anthem being performed first, followed by the host country. Baseball teams play "O Canada" at games involving the Toronto Blue Jays and their High-A Minor League Baseball affiliate, the Vancouver Canadians. National Basketball Association teams do so for games involving the Toronto Raptors, and Major League Soccer teams do so for matches involving Toronto FC, CF Montréal, and Vancouver Whitecaps FC. In recognition of their Canadian fanbases and Buffalo's proximity to Canada, the Buffalo Bills of the National Football League, the NHL's Buffalo Sabres, and the Buffalo Bisons (the MiLB Triple-A affiliate of the Toronto Blue Jays) play "O Canada" before "The Star-Spangled Banner" at their home games. "O Canada" has also been performed during NHL Global Series games involving Canadian teams as well as NBA Global Games involving the Raptors and MLB World Tour games involving the Blue Jays.

== Laws and etiquette ==
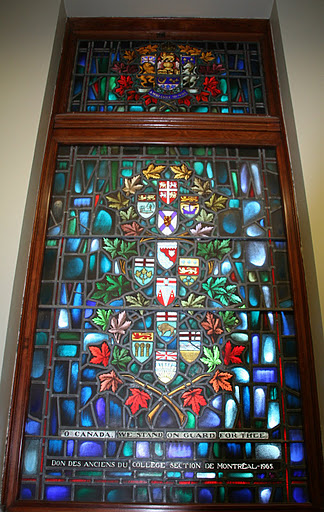
A portion of the lyrics of "O Canada" in stained glass at the Royal Military College of Canada

The National Anthem Act specifies the lyrics and melody of "O Canada", placing both of them in the public domain, allowing the anthem to be freely reproduced or used as a base for derived works, including musical arrangements. There are no regulations governing the performance of "O Canada", leaving citizens to exercise their best judgment. When it is performed at an event, traditional etiquette is to either start or end the ceremonies with the anthem, including situations when other anthems are played and for the audience to stand during the performance. Civilian men usually remove their hats, while women and children are not required to do so. Military men and women in uniform traditionally keep their hats on and offer the military salute during the performance of the anthem, with the salute offered in the direction of the Canadian Flag if one is present, and if not present it is offered standing at attention.

Presently, provincial regulations and policies in Manitoba, New Brunswick, Nova Scotia, Ontario and Prince Edward Island mandate the national anthem to be played daily in public elementary and secondary schools. "O Canada" is to be played in British Columbia schools at least three times a year at assemblies. Other provinces and territories do not have provincially mandated regulations and policies for playing the national anthem in schools.

== Adaptations ==
In the 1950s, the melody of "O Canada" was adapted for the school anthem of the Ateneo de Manila University. Titled "A Song for Mary" or "The Ateneo de Manila Graduation Hymn", the lyrics were written by James B. Reuter, SJ, and the original tune adapted by Col. José Manela Campaña, bandmaster of the defunct Philippine Constabulary Band.

== See also ==
- Canadian patriotic music
- Music of Canada
- List of national anthems
- Personal anthem
