= Jacalyn Duffin =

Canadian historian

Jackie Duffin
- Born: Jacalyn M. Duffin; June 9, 1950 (age 76)
- Education: 1985 Doctorat du 3e c. Sorbonne, History and Philosophy of Science (PhD); 1985 Diplôme de l'Ecole Pratique des Hautes Etudes, IV Section, Paris; 1983 D.E.A.Paris-I-Sorbonne, France; 1979 F.R.C.P.(C) Internal medicine 1979 F.R.C.P.(C) Hematology; 1979 C.S.P.Q. Hématologie; 1974 M.D. University of Toronto
- Occupations: Professor in the History of Medicine, Hematologist
- Known for: Medical evidence of miracle which helped canonize Marie-Marguerite d'Youville
- Notable work: Medical Miracles: Doctors, Saints and Healing in the Modern World, Oxford University Press, 2009; History of Medicine: a Scandalously Short Introduction, University of Toronto Press, 1999; Macmillan, 2000
- Title: Hannah Chair, History of Medicine
- Relatives: Ross W. Duffin (brother)
- Awards: W.F. Connell Award for Teaching Excellence, Annual Lectureship Award, First Year Medicine, Class of 2009 (shared with Dr C. Reifel, Anatomy)

Jacalyn M. Duffin CM FRSC (born 1950) is a Canadian medical historian and hematologist. She held the Hannah Chair, History of Medicine at Queen's University from 1988 until 2017. Formerly, she was president of the American Association for the History of Medicine and Canadian Society for the History of Medicine. From 1993 to 1995 she was Associate Dean Undergraduate Studies and Education at Queen's University. She is best known for her testimony which led to the canonization of Marie-Marguerite d'Youville. As of 2010, she has published eight books (as author and editor) on the history of medicine and has written numerous articles on various subjects relating to the history of medicine, miracles, and hematology. In 2019, Duffin was inducted into the Canadian Medical Hall of Fame.

== Biography ==
=== Education ===
Duffin completed her MD from the University of Toronto. Soon after this, she moved to Paris, where she elected to study hematology and René Laennec at the Sorbonne. She completed her PhD in the History of Medicine in 1985, she then returned to Canada.

=== Vatican testimony ===
Upon her return to Canada, Duffin settled in Ottawa, where she took on a contract to review a set of slides, which she assumed were to be used in a malpractice suit. She was given no information about the patient, but identified the young woman as suffering from acute myeloblastic leukemia, "the most aggressive leukemia known." As the slides were from some 5+ years earlier, she assumed the patient as deceased, as that form of leukemia kills usually within two years. Instead, she found that the patient had, after a relapse, gone into remission and was doing well some five years on. Duffin's testimony was to be used by the Vatican to determine whether Marie-Marguerite d'Youville (1701–1771) had performed a miracle and was worthy of canonization. According to Duffin, "They never asked me to say this was a miracle. They wanted to know if I had a scientific explanation for why this patient was still alive. I realized they weren’t asking me to endorse their beliefs. They didn’t care if I was a believer or not, they cared about the science."

== Works ==
- Langstaff: A Nineteenth-Century Medical Life, University of Toronto Press, 1993; London: Macmillan; reprinted 1999.
- To See with a Better Eye: A Life of R.T.H. Laennec, Princeton University Press, 1998.
- History of Medicine: A Scandalously Short Introduction
  - 1st edition, University of Toronto Press, 1999; Macmillan, 2000; Korean translation, 2006; Spanish translation, 2018; Chinese translation, 2021.
  - 2nd revised and expanded ed., U Toronto Press, 2010.
  - 3rd revised and expanded ed., U Toronto Press, 2021.
- Lovers and Livers: Disease Concepts in History. The Joanne Goodman Lectures, 2002, University of Toronto Press, 2005.
- Medical Miracles: Doctors, Saints and Healing in the Modern World, Oxford University Press, 2009.
- Medical Saints: Cosmas and Damian in a Postmodern World, Oxford University Press, 2013.
- To See with a Better Eye: A Life of R. T. H. Laenec, Princeton University Press, 2016.
- Stanley's Dream: The Medical Expedition to Easter Island, McGill-Queen's University Press, 2019.
- Heaven, Hell, and Purgatory: A Canadian Memoir of a Happy Polish Childhood, Nazi Horror, and Swedish Refuge, co-author with Halina Maria Czajkowska Robinson, 2020.
- COVID-19: A History, McGill-Queen's University Press, 2022.

=== Translator ===
- Grmek, Mirko D., History of AIDS: Emergence and Origin of a Modern Pandemic, Princeton University Press, 1990 (translation of Histoire du sida [1989], with Russell C. Maulitz)

=== Editor ===
- Clio in the Clinic: History in Medical Practice, Oxford University Press, 2005.
- SARS in Context: Memory, History, and Policy, with Arthur Sweetman, 2006.

== Honours ==
- 2023, 2009, and 2001 Jason A. Hannah Medal of the Royal Society of Canada for an important publication in the history of medicine
- 2021 Member of the Order of Canada
- 2019 Inductee, Canadian Medical Hall of Fame
- 2013 Fellow of the Canadian Academy of Health Sciences
- 2012 Fellow of the Royal Society of Canada
- 2007 Distinguished International Scholar, University of Pennsylvania
- 2007 Alpha Omega Alpha Visiting Professor, University of Chicago
