= Ross W. Duffin =

Canadian-American musicologist

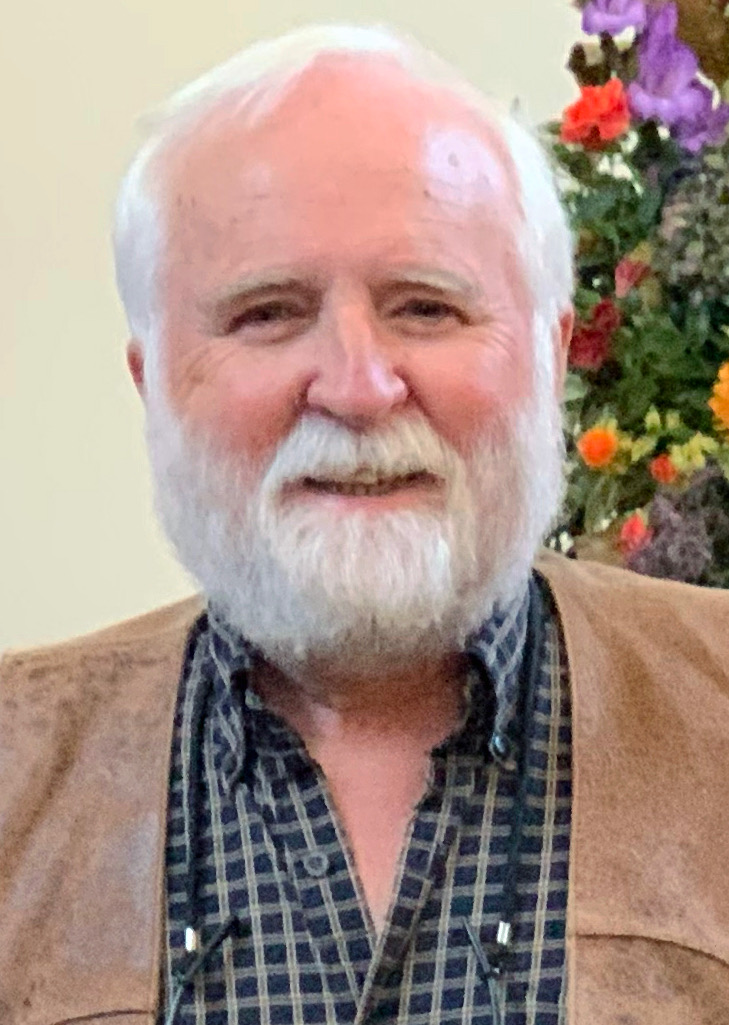
- Born: Ross William Duffin; 7 November 1951 (age 74); London, Ontario, Canada
- Citizenship: United States of America
- Occupations: Musicologist, Educator, Choral Conductor
- Spouse: Beverly Simmons (m. 1976)
- Children: 2
- Relatives: Jacalyn Duffin (sister)
- Awards: Howard Mayer Brown Award; Claude V. Palisca Award; Thomas Binkley Award; Noah Greenberg Award

Academic background
- Education: University of Western Ontario; Stanford University
- Doctoral advisor: William P. Mahrt

Academic work
- Discipline: Music
- Sub-discipline: Historical Performance Practice
- Notable works: Shakespeare's Songbook; How Equal Temperament Ruined Harmony (and Why You Should Care)

Ross W. Duffin is a Canadian-American scholar, educator, and choral conductor, specializing in historical performance practice of early music. He is known for his work in early English play songs (including William Shakespeare) and in historical tuning systems. As host of the weekly syndicated radio program, Micrologus: Exploring the World of Early Music, he established a national audience. Duffin held the Fynette H. Kulas Chair in Music at Case Western Reserve University, where he taught for 4 decades and was named Distinguished University Professor. He has published books, music editions, and scholarly articles on music from the 13th century to the 19th, and has won awards for his scholarship and editions.

== Education ==
Duffin was born in London, Ontario. He earned a BMus in Music History from the University of Western Ontario (now Western University) in 1973, studying with Gordon K. Greene, Philip G. Downs, and Timothy Aarset. He received a scholarship from the Charles H. Ivey Foundation and was Valedictorian for the Faculty of Music.

As a Canada Council Doctoral Fellow, Duffin enrolled at Stanford University, to earn an MA and DMA in Performance Practice of Early Music (in 1974 and 1977, respectively), working primarily with William P. Mahrt and George Houle.

== Academic history ==
After teaching for a year (August 1977–June 1978) at McMaster University in Hamilton, Ontario, Canada, Duffin joined the Music Department at Case Western Reserve University in Cleveland, Ohio. He was named to the Fynette H. Kulas chair in 1986, and Distinguished University Professor in 2017.

As director of Case's Historical Performance Practice program (1978–2018), he taught graduate and undergraduate courses; directed the CWRU Collegium Musicum, and the Early Music Singers, and founded the Baroque Orchestra. He also served as artistic director for the concert series, Chapel, Court, & Countryside, for its 25-year run.

In 2013, Duffin spent a year as Visiting Fellow at Clare Hall, Cambridge University, in the UK. He is now a Life Member.

In addition to giving talks on historical tuning throughout England and Scotland, Duffin coached the choral scholars at King's College, Cambridge and St. John's College, Cambridge. He was the first guest director of the Choir of St John's College, Cambridge, in an Evensong service, recounted in his article, "Cracking a Centuries-Old Tradition," in Early Music America's EMAg.

He remains a Reader at the Folger Shakespeare Library in Washington, DC, and at the Huntington Library in San Marino, California.

== Books ==
- Some Other Note: The Lost Songs of English Renaissance Comedy. Oxford and New York: Oxford University Press, 2018. Reviewed in Early Theatre and Shakespeare Quarterly.
- The Music Treatises of Thomas Ravenscroft: 'Treatise of Practicall Musicke' (c.1607) and A Briefe Discourse (1614), editor. In the series Music Theory in Britain 1500–1700, Jessie Ann Owens, general editor. Farnham, UK: Ashgate, 2014.
- How Equal Temperament Ruined Harmony (And Why You Should Care). New York: W. W. Norton, 2007; paperback, 2008; Polish translation, 2016; Chinese translation, 2018; French translation, 2022. Reviewed in Early Music (journal), Echo, and Kirkus Reviews.
- Shakespeare's Songbook. New York: W. W. Norton, 2004. Winner of the inaugural Claude V. Palisca Award from the American Musicological Society (2005). Reviewed in Early Music (journal) and College Music Symposium.
- A Performer's Guide to Medieval Music, editor. Bloomington: Indiana University Press, 2000; paperback, 2002. Reviewed in Early Music (journal) and Journal of the Royal Musical Association.
- Inventory of Musical Iconography, no. 8: The Cleveland Museum of Art. Répertoire Internationale d'Iconographie Musicale, 1991.

== Other works ==
In addition to books, Duffin has made historically informed editions of Medieval and Renaissance music, including most of the music performed by Quire Cleveland, a professional choir of which he was founding artistic director (2008–2018). He produced several CDs and hundreds of videos with the ensemble.

Highlights among his published editions include Forty-five Dufay Chansons from Canonici 213 which won the Noah Greenberg Award, A Josquin Anthology: 12 Motets, Richard Davy: St. Matthew Passion, and Gude & Godlie Ballatis. He designed historic music fonts for this purpose, which have been used by Early Music (journal) and other publications.

In 2024, he published a series of 12 books of Renaissance Choral Favorites for SATB Singers. Featuring both sacred and secular music from England, France, Germany, Italy, and Spain, the editions were prepared for school choirs and amateur musicians.

His scholarly articles have been published in North America and Europe. Several have been covered in the press, including "Calixa Lavallée and the Construction of a National Anthem," proposing that "O Canada" was assembled from a handful of pre-existing works; it was featured on the front page of Toronto's Globe and Mail. Another article, "Leonardo's Lira," identifying a portrait of Leonardo da Vinci in an early sixteenth-century engraving at the Cleveland Museum of Art, was covered in Live Science, NBC News, and Huffington Post.

Duffin also earned notice for his parody compositions. In 1995, when the Cleveland Indians (now the Cleveland Guardians) reached the World Series, he wrote "Come All Ye Baseball Fans" to the tune of Henry Purcell's "Come Ye Sons of Art," which was noted in The Chronicle of Higher Education and Sports Illustrated, and nominated for a Northern Ohio Live Award of Achievement. When his daughter, Selena Simmons-Duffin, joined the staff of All Things Considered at National Public Radio, he wrote and produced historically based theme music ("trixies") for the program.

== Awards and honors ==
- Howard Mayer Brown Award from Early Music America (with Beverly Simmons), recognizing "lifetime achievement in the field of early music". (2018)
- Claude V. Palisca Award from the American Musicological Society for Shakespeare's Songbook, an edition chosen from world-wide publications to "best exemplify the highest qualities of originality, interpretation, logic and clarity of thought, and communication". (2005)
- Thomas Binkley Award from Early Music America, recognizing "outstanding achievement in both performance and scholarship by the director of a university or college collegium musicum". (2005)
- Noah Greenberg Award from the American Musicological Society for "distinguished contribution to the study and performance of early music". (1980)

== Personal life ==
In 1976, Duffin married Beverly Simmons (1950–), whom he met in their graduate program. They have two children, Caltech physicist David Simmons-Duffin (1984–) and NPR correspondent Selena Simmons-Duffin (1986–). His sister, Jacalyn Duffin, is a medical historian and hematologist.
