= Culture and traditions of the Ateneo de Manila =

Ateneo de Manila University (Filipino: Pamantasang Ateneo de Manila; Spanish: Universidad Ateneo de Manila; Latin: Universitas Athenæa Manilensis) is a Catholic, private research university in Quezon City, Metro Manila, Philippines.

Founded in 1859 as the Escuela Municipal by the Society of Jesus, Ateneo de Manila is the third-oldest extant university in the country. This article deals solely with the university’s culture and traditions.

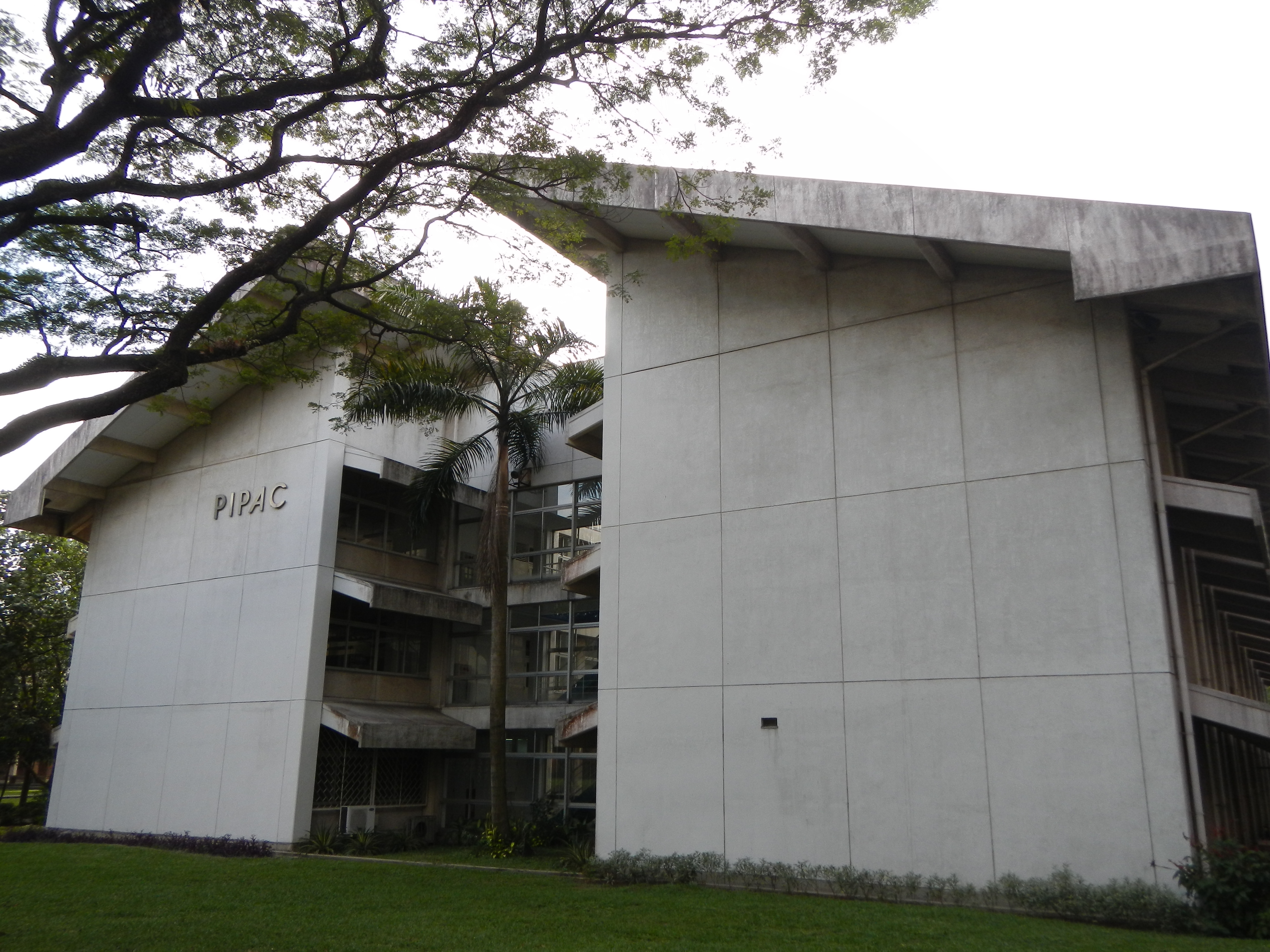
The Philippine Institute for Pure and Applied Chemistry (PIPAC) is a research facility housed on university grounds, but independent from its administration.

== Name ==
The Spanish term Ateneo is derived from the Latin word Athenæum, denoting a temple to Athena, goddess of wisdom, warfare, and the tutelary of the city of Athens in Greek mythology. The closest English gloss for this term is academy.

The Society of Jesus in the Philippines established several other schools beginning in 1856, with nine of these named “Ateneo”. Over the years, the name became recognized as the official title of Jesuit institutions of higher learning in the islands.

== Motto ==
The present motto of the university is "Lux in Domino" ("Light in the Lord"), taken from Ephesians 5:8:

== Marian devotions ==
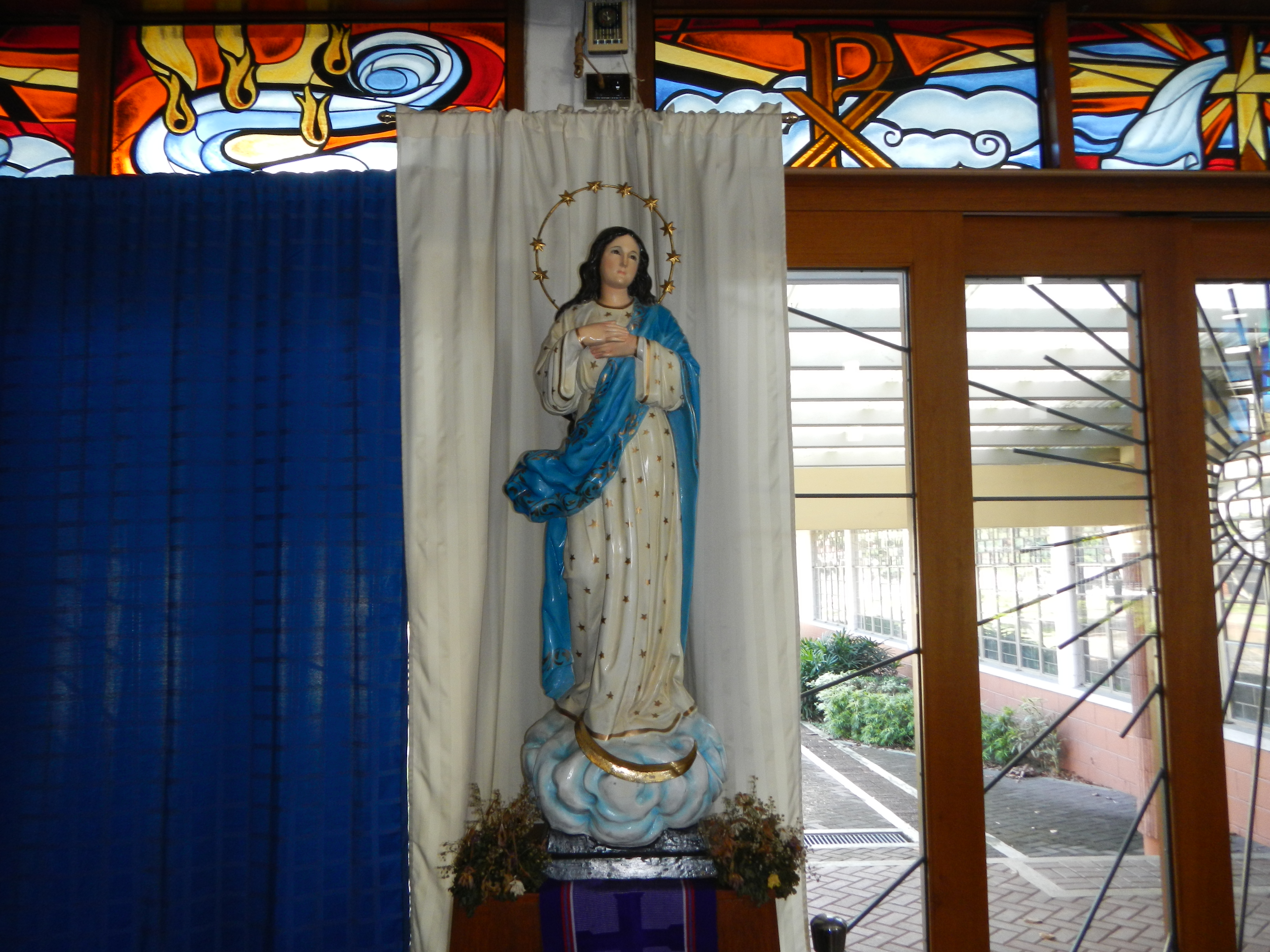
An image of the Immaculate Conception enshrined in the Ateneo Grade School's Chapel of the Holy Guardian Angels.

Ateneans value symbols of devotion to María la Purísima Concepción (Our Lady of the Immaculate Conception). Her traditional blue and white robes are the origin of the School colors, as alluded to in the alma mater hymn, A Song for Mary.

== Mascot ==
In the 1930s, Ateneo de Manila adopted the Blue Eagle as its symbol; the precise species varies from depiction to depiction. The Philippine Eagle (Pithecophaga jefferyi) is also the national bird of the Philippines.
