= Canadian Society for the History of Medicine =

The Canadian Society for the History of Medicine was established in 1950 at the Université Laval at the invitation of historian L'abbé Arthur Maheux. Its first president was Sylvio LeBlond. Its journal is the Canadian Bulletin of Medical History.
