= Lasallian educational institutions =

Catholic educational institutions

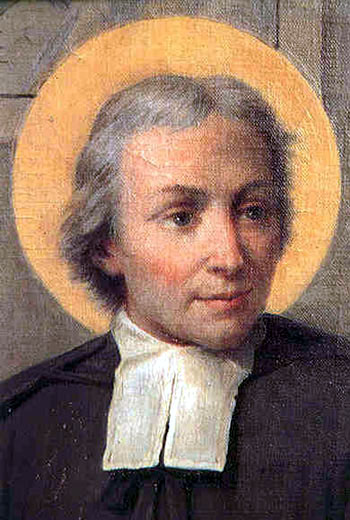
Saint Jean-Baptiste de La Salle, founder of the De La Salle Brothers and Patron Saint of all teachers

Lasallian educational institutions are educational institutions affiliated with the De La Salle Brothers, a Catholic religious teaching order founded by French priest Saint Jean-Baptiste de La Salle, who was canonized in 1900 and proclaimed by Pope Pius XII as patron saint of all teachers of youth on May 15, 1950. In regard to their educational activities, the Brothers have since 1680 also called themselves "Brothers of the Christian Schools", associated with the Institute of the Brothers of the Christian Schools; they are often referred to by themselves and others by the shorter term "Christian Brothers", a name also applied to the unrelated Congregation of Christian Brothers or Irish Christian Brothers, also providers of education, which commonly causes confusion.

In 2021 the International Lasallian Mission Web site stated that the Lasallian order consists of about 3,000 Brothers, who help in running over 1,100 education centers in 80 countries with more than a million students, together with 90,000 teachers and lay associates.

Short "one-line" prayers are recited in Lasallian educational institutions during the school day, Typical wordings of some are:

Let us remember that we are in the holy presence of God. (Note: This is followed by a period of silence, then sometimes: I will continue, O my God, to do all my actions for love of you.)
Live Jesus in our hearts! Forever!
Saint John Baptist de La Salle, pray for us.

The US-based La Salle International Foundation, which supports global educational and other networks of the De La Salle Brothers, says on its website that it sponsors educational projects and supports schools in 80 countries. Additionally, it commits to giving special attention to youth at risk, including "educationally excluded [children], street children, orphans, victims of child abuse, drug addicts, disabled youth, individuals with mental illness, migrant and refugee youth, HIV+ and AIDS children, child victims of war, juvenile offenders, child laborers, victims of child trafficking, ethnic minorities, disadvantaged girls, and impoverished children".

Since the 1980s, increasing numbers of cases of sexual and physical abuse of children--covered up by authorities, in institutions of the Catholic Church and others—have been reported. Cases of physical and sexual abuse of children in Lasallian educational institutions—along with failure to investigate, report, and subsequently protect children—have been investigated, admitted to, and apologized for.

== Africa ==
=== Benin ===
- Collège Mgr Steinmetz

=== Burkina Faso ===
- Collège De La Salle, in Ouagadougou
- Collège Lasallien Badenya, in Ouagadougou
- Collège de Tounouma Bobo Dioulasso
- Collège Saint Jean-Baptiste De La Salle Kiri Bobo Dioulasso
- Collège Lasallien de Kongoussi
- Centre Lasallien d'Initiation aux Métiers d'Agriculture (CLIMA), in Beregadougou
- Collège Pierre Kula, in Diebougou
- Collège Charles Lwanga, in Nouna

=== Democratic Republic of the Congo ===
- Collège De La Salle and Saint Georges in Kinshasa
- Collège Ntetembwa in Matadi
- Bosawa, Liboke Moko, and Liziba primary schools, plus Institut Frère Iloo in Mbandaka
- Tumba Kunda dia Zayi in Tumba

=== Egypt ===
- Collège De La Salle in Daher, Cairo
- Collège des Frères (Bab al-Louq), in Cairo
- Collège Saint Gabriel in Alexandria
- Collège Saint Joseph in Khoronfish, Cairo
- Collège Saint Marc in Alexandria
- Collège Saint Paul in Shobra, Cairo

=== Eritrea ===
- Saint Joseph School, Karen
- Hagaz Agricultural and technology school, Hagaz Eritrea

=== Ethiopia ===
- St. Joseph School (Addis Ababa)
- St. Joseph School (Adama)
- Bisrate-Gabriel School (Dire Dawa)
- Meki Catholic School (Meki)

=== Kenya ===
- La Salle Catholic Primary School, Nairobi
- Christ the Teacher Institute for Education, Nairobi
- Saint Mary's Boys High School, Nyeri
- Saint Paul School, Marsabit
- Bishop Ndingi Mwangaza Collège, Nakuru
- Child Discovery Center, Nakuru
- Rongai Agricultural and Technical School, Rongai
- St Lasalle School, Karemeno

=== Madagascar ===
- Collège Saint-Louis-de-Gonzague, Ambositra
- Collège Saint-Joseph, Ambatondrazaka
- Collège Saint-Jean, Antalaha
- Lycée Stella Maris, Toamasina
- Institution Sainte Famille (Mahamasina), Antananarivo
- École Saint-Joseph (Andohalo), Antananarivo
- École Louis Rafiringa (Faravohitra), Antananarivo
- Centre de Promotion rurale (CPR), Ambositra

=== Mozambique ===
- Escola Joao XXIII, Beira, Sofala

=== Niger ===
- L.E.P. Issa Béri in Niamey

=== Nigeria ===
- De La Salle Middle School, Ondo State
- Mount De La Salle College, Naka, Makurdi, Benue State

=== Rwanda ===
- Académie De La Salle in Byumba
- École d’Art NYUNDO in Gisenyi
- Teachers Training College De La Salle Byumba
- Kigali De La Salle School
- Centre Intiganda Butare
- De La Salle School of KIRENGE

=== Senegal ===
- Collège Saint Charles Lwanga, Ziguinchor

=== South Africa ===
- De La Salle Holy Cross College in Johannesburg
- La Salle College in Roodepoort

== Asia ==
=== Hong Kong ===
- St. Joseph's College, in Hong Kong Island
- La Salle College, in Kowloon Tong, Kowloon
- La Salle Primary School, Kowloon Tong, Kowloon
- De La Salle Secondary School, N.T., in Sheung Shui
- St. Joseph's Primary School, in Hong Kong Island
- Chan Sui Ki (La Salle) College, in Ho Man Tin, Kowloon
- Chong Gene Hang College, in Chai Wan
- Chan Sui Ki (La Salle) Primary School, in Ho Man Tin, Kowloon

=== India ===
- St.La Salle Hr.Sec School, in Tuticorin.
- St.Joseph Hr.Sec.School, in Sooranam, Sivagangai
- Boys Town ITI, Madurai
- Arul Thendral, Aspirancy, in Madurai
- S.Joseph.Juniorate, in Tuticorin
- St.Pauls Higher Secondary School, in Montfort Hill, Aizawl

=== Indonesia ===
- De La Salle Catholic University, in Manado

=== Israel and Palestine ===
==== Israel ====
- Collège des Frères, in Haifa
- Collège des Frères, in Jaffa
- Collège des Frères, in Nazareth

==== Jerusalem ====
- Collège des Frères, in the Old City of Jerusalem
- Collège des Frères, in the Beit Hanina suburb of East Jerusalem

==== West Bank ====
- Bethlehem University
- Collège Des Frères, Bethlehem

=== Japan ===
- Hakodate La Salle High School
- La Salle High School (Kagoshima, Japan)

=== Jordan ===
- De La Salle Frere, in Amman

=== Lebanon ===
- Collège de La Salle, Kfayachit, Zgharta
- Collège Mont La Salle, Ain Saadeh
- Collège des Frères, Tripoli, Dedeh-Koura
- Collège du Sacré-Cœur, Gemmayzé, Beirut
- Collège Notre-Dame, Furn el Chebback, Beirut
- École Saint-Pierre, Baskinta
- Ecole Saint Vincent de Paul, Bourj Hammoud, Beirut

=== Malaysia ===
- La Salle Chinese Primary School, Brickfields, Kuala Lumpur
- La Salle School, Brickfields, Kuala Lumpur
- La Salle School, Ipoh Garden, Ipoh, Perak
- La Salle School, Jinjang, Kuala Lumpur
- La Salle School, Klang
- La Salle School, Kota Kinabalu
- La Salle School, Peel Road, Kuala Lumpur
- La Salle School, Penang Formerly on the site of SJK (C) Shang Wu, a Chinese Christian school
- La Salle School, Petaling Jaya
- La Salle School, Sentul, Kuala Lumpur
- St. Andrew's Secondary School (Muar, Johor)
- St. Anthony's School, Teluk Intan, Perak
- St. Francis Institution, Melaka
- St. George's Institution, Taiping, Perak
- St. John's Institution, Kuala Lumpur
- St. Joseph's Institution International School Malaysia, Petaling Jaya
- St. Joseph's Secondary School in Kuching, Sarawak
- St. Martin's School in Tambunan, Sabah
- St. Mary's Secondary School in Sandakan, Sabah
- St. Michael's Institution, Ipoh, Perak
- St. Paul's Institution, Seremban
- St. Theresa Chinese Primary School, Brickfields, Kuala Lumpur
- St. Theresa Padungan Primary School in Kuching, Sarawak
- St. Theresa Primary School in Kuching, Sarawak
- St. Theresa Secondary School in Kuching, Sarawak
- St. Xavier's Institution, Penang
- Sacred Heart Secondary School in Sibu, Sarawak

(Note: The Lasallian Education Mission in Malaysia cites 44 schools in total)

=== Myanmar ===
Former Lasallian schools; no longer affiliated

- St Peter's High School, Mandalay
- St. Patrick's High School, Mawlamyaing
- St. Paul's English High School, Yangon
- St. Albert's High School, Maymyo
- St. Columban's High School, Bhamo
- St. Joseph's High School, Loikaw
- De La Salle School, Twante

=== Pakistan ===
- La Salle High School Faisalabad
- La Salle High School Multan

=== Philippines ===
- De La Salle–College of Saint Benilde in Manila
- De La Salle Andres Soriano Memorial College in Cebu
- De La Salle Araneta University in Malabon
- De La Salle John Bosco College in Bislig
- De La Salle Lipa in Batangas
- De La Salle Medical and Health Sciences Institute in Cavite
- De La Salle Santiago Zobel School in Muntinlupa
- De La Salle University in Manila
- De La Salle University – Dasmariñas in Cavite
- Jaime Hilario Integrated School – La Salle in Bataan
- La Salle Academy in Iligan
- La Salle College Antipolo
- La Salle Green Hills in Mandaluyong
- La Salle University (Ozamiz) in Misamis Occidental
- St. Joseph School – La Salle in Bacolod
- University of St. La Salle in Bacolod

=== Singapore ===
- De La Salle School
- LASALLE College of the Arts
- Saint Anthony's Primary School
- Saint Joseph's Institution
- Saint Joseph's Institution International School
- Saint Joseph's Institution Junior (formerly Saint Michael's School)
- Saint Patrick's School
- Saint Stephen's School

=== Sri Lanka ===
- De La Salle College, Mutwal
- St. Anne's College, Kurunegala
- St. Anthony's College, Wattala
- St. Benedict's College, Colombo
- St. Joseph's College, Grandpass
- St. Joseph's Preschool, Mutwal
- St. Mary's College, Chilaw
- St. Sebastian's College, Moratuwa
- St. Xavier's Boys' College, Mannar
- De Mazenod College, Kandana
- Diyagala Boys' Town, Ragama

=== Thailand ===
- La Salle Chotiravi Nakhonsawan School
- La Salle Chanthaburi (Marndapitak) School
- La Salle Bangna School, Bangkok
- La Salle Sangkhlaburi School

=== Vietnam ===
In 1975, all of the La Salle schools in Việt Nam were dissolved. In the following year the École Taberd was taken over by the Vietnamese Ministry of Education and transformed into a secondary school becoming the Trần Đại Nghĩa Specialist High School for gifted students in 2000.

- Institution La Salle-Taberd, Saigon

== Europe ==
=== Austria ===
- Vienna
  - De La Salle Strebersdorf
  - De La Salle Währing
  - De La Salle Marianum
  - De La Salle Fünfhaus

=== Belgium ===
- Communauté Éducative Saint-Jean-Baptiste in Tamines
- Institut Notre-Dame Beauraing-Gedinne in Beauraing
- Institut Saint-Joseph in Carlsbourg
- Institut Saint-Joseph in Châtelet
- ISJBDLS - Institut saint Jean Baptiste de La Salle in Brussels
- Sint-Jorisinstituut in Bazel
- Sint-Jansschool in Leuven
- Technisch Instituut Sint-Jozef in Bilzen
- Moretus-Ekeren in Ekeren (Antwerp)
- Sint-Jozefinstituut in Genk
- Kunsthumaniora Sint-Lucas in Ghent
- De Pleinschool Leiekant in Kortrijk
- De Pleinschool Groeningekant in Kortrijk
- De Pleinschool Broelkant in Kortrijk
- VISO in Mariakerke, Ghent
- Instituut Onze-Lieve-Vrouw-van-Vreugde in Roeselare
- Sint-Lukaskunsthumaniora in Schaerbeek
- KCST in Sint-Truiden
- Tuinbouwschool Scholengroep O.-L.-Vrouw in Sint-Truiden
- Sint-Jozefsinstituut in Ternat
- Zaventems Vrij Onderwijs (ZAVO) in Zaventem
- Sint-Aloysius Scholengroep O.-L.-Vrouw in Zepperen

=== France ===
In France, the Brothers of the Christian schools run 68 primary schools, 92 middle schools, 53 general high schools and 47 vocational high schools, including:

- Institut polytechnique LaSalle Beauvais, engineering school
- Institution Saint-Jean-Baptiste de la Salle (Avignon)
- Lycée Saint Joseph - La Salle de Lorient (Lorient)
- Pensionnat Jean-Baptiste-de-La-Salle (Rouen)
- Unilasalle, Beauvais
- Institution Saint-Joseph (Toulouse)
- Collège & Lycée le Likès (Quimper)

=== Greece ===
- College De La Salle, in Pefka, Thessaloniki
- Saint George De La Salle, in Syros Island, Cyclades
- Saint-Paul De La Salle, in Alimos, Attiki
- Collège Gréco-Français "Saint-Paul", in Alimos (moved recently), Attiki

=== Hungary ===
- Österreichisch-Ungarische Europaschule, Budapest

=== Ireland ===
- De La Salle College Churchtown, Dublin
- De La Salle College Dundalk, County Louth
- De La Salle College Waterford, County Waterford
- De La Salle College Macroom, Cork
- Beneavin De La Salle college, in Finglas, Dublin
- Presentation De La Salle College, in Bagenalstown, County Carlow
- St Fachtna's De La Salle College, in Skibbereen, County Cork
- St. Joseph's De La Salle College Wicklow, County Wicklow
- St John's College De La Salle, Ballyfermot, Dublin
- St Gerald's College Castlebar, County Mayo

=== Italy ===
- Collegio S. Giuseppe, Torino
- Istituto Gonzaga, Milano
- Istituto Pio XII, Rome
- Istituto S. Giuseppe Demerode, Rome

=== Jersey ===
- De La Salle College

=== Malta ===
- De La Salle College, in Cottonera
- Stella Maris College, in Gżira
- St. Benild, in Sliema

=== Poland ===
- Szkoła im. św. Jana de La Salle, in Gdańsk
- Szkoła im. św. Jana de La Salle, in Częstochowa

=== Slovakia ===
- Spojená škola De La Salle, in Bratislava

=== Spain ===
- Colegio La Salle Alcoi, in Alicante
- Irungo La Salle, in Irun
- Colegio La Salle, in Córdoba
- Colegio La Salle Paterna, in Valencia
- Colegio La Salle Paterna Profesional, in Valencia
- Colegio La Salle, in Valladolid
- Colegio Inmaculada Concepción La Salle, in Andújar
- La Salle Barcelona, in Barcelona
- La Salle Bonanova, in Barcelona
- La Salle Gràcia, in Barcelona
- La Salle Guadalupe de Plasencia, in Cáceres
- La Salle Horta, in Barcelona
- La Salle Inca, in Mallorca
- La Salle Manacor, in Mallorca
- La Salle Manlleu, in Barcelona
- La Salle Mollerussa, in Lleida
- La Salle Montemolín, in Zaragoza
- La Salle Palma, in Mallorca
- La Salle Palamós, in Girona
- La Salle Pont d'Inca, in Mallorca
- La Salle Premià de Mar, in Barcelona
- La Salle Reus, in Tarragona
- La Salle Sant Celoni, in Barcelona
- La Salle Talavera, in Toledo
- La Salle Tarragona, in Tarragona
- La Salle Torreforta, in Tarragona
- La Salle Virgen del Mar, in Almería
- Colegio Nuestra Señora de las Maravillas, in Madrid

=== Turkey ===
- Saint Joseph Fransız Lisesi, Istanbul
- Saint Michel Fransız Lisesi, Istanbul
- Saint Joseph Fransız Lisesi, Izmir

=== United Kingdom ===
- The former De La Salle Academy, Liverpool is now Dixons Croxteth Academy (no formal faith affiliation)
- De La Salle Boys' Home, Rubane House, Kircubbin, County Down, Northern Ireland. Closed 1985, site now Echlinville Distillery.
- De La Salle College, in Belfast, Northern Ireland
- De La Salle High School, in Downpatrick, Northern Ireland
- De La Salle School, in Basildon, Essex
- De La Salle School, in St. Helens, Merseyside
- The former De La Salle College, Sheffield (until 1976) is now All Saints Catholic High School, Sheffield
- The former building of De La Salle College of Higher Education, Middleton, is part of Hopwood Hall College
- The former De La Salle College, Salford merged into Pendleton College in 1997
- St Aloysius' College in Islington
- St Gilbert's, former approved school, Hartlebury, Worcestershire
- St John's College, Southsea, Portsmouth (Now Closed)
- St Joseph's College in Upper Norwood, London
- St. Joseph's College, Ipswich
- St. Joseph's Industrial School, in Tranent
- St Matthew Academy, Blackheath
- St Patrick's Grammar School, Downpatrick, Northern Ireland
- St Peter's Catholic School, Bournemouth
- Cardinal Langley Roman Catholic High School, Middleton, Greater Manchester

== North and Central America ==
=== Canada ===
- De La Salle College, in Deer Park, Toronto, Ontario
- Senator O'Connor College School, in North York, Toronto, Ontario

=== Costa Rica ===
- La Salle School and College, in San José

=== Cuba ===
- Colegio de La Salle, Vedado, Havana,
- Colegio de La Salle, Miramar, Havana
- Academia de La Salle, Havana
- Colegio de La Salle, Marianao, Havana

=== Dominican Republic ===
- Colegio Dominicano De La Salle, in Santo Domingo
- Escuela/Liceo San Juan Bautista De La Salle, in Santo Domingo (Barrio Simón Bolívar)
- Instituto San Juan Bautista De La Salle, Santo Domingo
- Colegio De La Salle, in Santiago de los Caballeros
- Escuela/Liceo Santo Hermano Miguel, in Santiago de los Caballeros (Barrio Mejoramiento Social)
- Escuela/Liceo Juan XXIII, in Higuey
- Escuela San Juan Bautista De La Salle, in Higuey (Barrio La Florida)

=== Honduras ===
- Instituto Experimental La Salle, in San Pedro Sula

=== Mexico ===
- Centro de Formación Integral La Salle, Tijuana, Baja California
- Colegio Benavente, in Puebla, Puebla
- Colegio La Salle de Puebla
- Colegio Régis La Salle, in Hermosillo, Sonora
- Escuela San Juan Bautista De La Salle, in Hermosillo, Sonora
- Instituto La Salle, Ciudad Obregón, Sonora
- Colegio Guadiana, in Durango, Durango
- Instituto Francés de la Laguna, in Gómez Palacio, Durango
- Instituto Regiomontano, in Monterrey, Nuevo León
  - Chepevera campus
  - Cumbres campus
- Colegio Regiomontano Contry, in Monterrey, Nuevo León
- Colegio Francisco G. Sada, in San Nicolás de los Garza, Nuevo León
- Colegio Ignacio Zaragoza (CIZ) La Salle, in Saltillo, Coahuila
- Colegio La Salle, in Monclova, Coahuila
- Preparatoria La Salle Torreón Torreón, Coahuila
- Colegio José de Escandón La Salle, in Ciudad Victoria, Tamaulipas
- Colegio de La Salle, in Matamoros, Tamaulipas
- Colegio Cristóbal Colón, Estado de México
- Colegio Simón Bolívar, in Ciudad de México
- Escuela Cristóbal Colón, in Ciudad de México
- Colegio La Salle Oaxaca
- Instituto La Salle de Chihuahua
- Colegio Francisco Febrés Cordero, in Guadalajara, Jalisco
- Colegio Vasco de Quiroga, in La Piedad, Michoacán
- Colegio La Salle, in Acapulco, Guerrero
- Colegio La Salle de Veracruz
- Universidad La Salle
  - Universidad de La Salle Bajío, León, Guanajuato
  - Universidad La Salle Cancún, Quintana Roo
  - Universidad La Salle Chihuahua
  - Universidad La Salle Cuernavaca, Morelos
  - Universidad La Salle, Mexico City
  - Universidad La Salle, Morelia, Michoacán
  - Universidad La Salle Nezahualcóyotl, Estado de México
  - Universidad La Salle Noroeste, Ciudad Obregón, Sonora
  - Universidad La Salle Oaxaca
  - Universidad La Salle Victoria, Tamaulipas
  - Universidad La Salle Pachuca, Hidalgo
  - Universidad La Salle Laguna, in Gómez Palacio, Durango
  - Universidad La Salle-Benavente, in Puebla, Puebla
  - Universidad La Salle Saltillo, Coahuila

Colegio fray Miguel de Bolonia San Juan de los lagos Jalisco

=== Nicaragua ===
- Instituto Pedagógico La Salle, in Managua
- Escuela Monseñor Lezcano, in Managua
- Colegio La Salle, in León
- Universidad Tecnológica La Salle, in León
- Instituto Politécnico La Salle, in León
- Escuela La Salle, in León
- Colegio La Salle, in Jinotega

=== Panama ===
- Colegio De La Salle, in Panama City
- Colegio San José De La Salle, in Colón
- Colegio La Salle (de Margarita), in Colón
- Colegio San Miguel Febres Cordero, in Los Lagos, Colón

=== United States ===
==== Arizona ====
- San Miguel High School (Tucson, Arizona)

==== California ====
- Cathedral High School, in Los Angeles
- Christian Brothers High School in Sacramento
- Cristo Rey De La Salle East Bay High School, in Oakland
- De La Salle Academy, in Concord
- De La Salle High School, Concord
- De Marillac Academy, in San Francisco
- Justin-Siena High School, in Napa
- La Salle College Preparatory (formerly known as La Salle High School) in Pasadena, California
- Sacred Heart Cathedral Preparatory in San Francisco
- Saint Mary's College High School, in Berkeley
- Saint Mary's College of California, in Moraga

==== Colorado ====
- J. K. Mullen High School, in Denver

==== District of Columbia ====
- St. John's College High School, in Washington, D.C.

==== Florida ====
- Saint John Paul II Academy in Boca Raton
- La Salle Education Center in Homestead

==== Illinois ====
- De La Salle Institute, in Chicago
- Christian Brothers of the Midwest in Chicago
- Lewis University, in Romeoville
- Montini Catholic High School in Lombard
- Resurrection College Prep High School, in Chicago
- St. Patrick High School, in Chicago

==== Louisiana ====
- De La Salle High School, in New Orleans
- Christian Brothers School, in New Orleans
- St. Paul's School, in Covington

==== Maryland ====
- Bishop Walsh School, in Cumberland (Allegheny County)
- Cardinal Gibbons School (formerly Cardinal Gibbons High School). Run by the Lasallians 2001–2010.
- Calvert Hall College High School, founded 1845 in downtown Baltimore, later relocated in 1960 to Towson

==== Michigan ====
- De La Salle Collegiate High School, in Warren

==== Minnesota ====
- DeLaSalle High School, in Minneapolis
- Benilde-St. Margaret's School – St Louis Park
- Cretin-Derham Hall High School, in St. Paul
- Holy Family Catholic High School, in Victoria
- Saint Mary's University of Minnesota, in Winona
- Totino-Grace High School, in Fridley

==== Missouri ====
- De La Salle Middle School, St. Louis (since 2014 operates as the public non-Catholic charter "La Salle Middle School")
- La Salle Institute, Glencoe
- Christian Brothers College High School, in St. Louis

==== Montana ====
- De La Salle Blackfeet School, Browning

==== New Jersey ====
- Christian Brothers Academy in Lincroft
- Hudson Catholic Regional High School, in Jersey City
- Queen of Peace High School, in North Arlington. Closed in 2017.

==== New Mexico ====
- College of Santa Fe (1966-2009) (previously St. Michael's College (1859–1966); subsequently the non-Lasallian Santa Fe University of Art and Design from 2010–2018), now closed
- St. Michael's High School

==== New York ====
- La Salle School, in Albany
- The De La Salle School, in Freeport
- La Salle Academy, in New York City
- La Salle Institute, in Troy
- Christian Brothers Academy, in Syracuse
- Christian Brothers Academy, in Albany
- St. Joseph's Collegiate Institute, in Buffalo
- St. Peter's Boys High School, in Staten Island
- St. Raymond High School for Boys, in The Bronx
- Bishop Loughlin Memorial High School, in Brooklyn
- Martin Deporres Alternative School System in, Queens/Brooklyn
- Manhattan University, in The Bronx
- De La Salle Academy, in Manhattan
- George Jackson Academy, in Manhattan

==== Ohio ====
- La Salle High School, in Cincinnati

==== Oklahoma ====
- San Miguel School in Tulsa
- Bishop Kelley High School in Tulsa

==== Oregon ====
- De La Salle North Catholic High School, in Portland
- La Salle High School, in Milwaukie

==== Pennsylvania ====
- Central Catholic High School, in Pittsburgh
- La Salle Academy, in Philadelphia
- La Salle College High School, in Wyndmoor
- La Salle University in Philadelphia
- Saint Gabriel's System, including St Gabriel's Hall and De La Salle Vocational, for court-adjudicated youth, Philadelphia
- Saint Thomas College, Scranton. Administered by the Lasallians 1897–1942, then transferred to the Jesuits. Renamed The University of Scranton in 1938
- West Catholic Preparatory High School, in Philadelphia

==== Puerto Rico ====
- Colegio de la Salle, in Bayamón
- Colegio de la Salle, in Añasco

==== Rhode Island ====
- La Salle Academy, in Providence
- St. Raphael Academy, in Pawtucket

==== Tennessee ====
- Christian Brothers High School, in Memphis
- Christian Brothers University, in Memphis

==== Texas ====
- Cathedral High School, in El Paso

==== Washington ====
- La Salle High School, in Union Gap

== Oceania ==
=== Australia ===
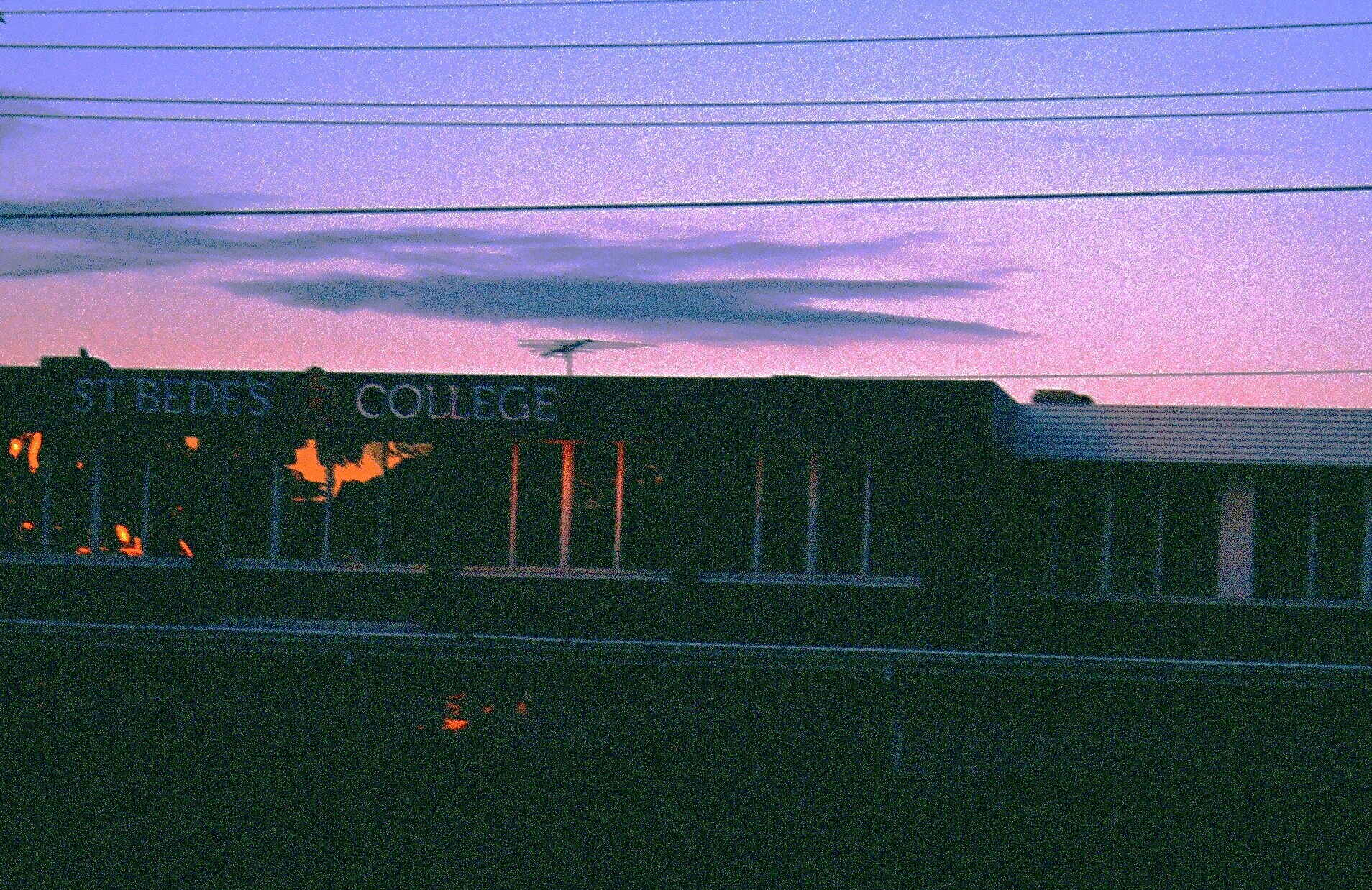
St Bedes's Bentleigh formerly St James College

De La Salle College, Scarborough in Brisbane, Queensland

- Casimir Catholic College, Marrickville, in Sydney, New South Wales
- De La Salle College, Caringbah, in Sydney, New South Wales
- St Aloysius College, Cronulla, in Sydney, New South Wales
- De La Salle College, Malvern, in Melbourne, Victoria
- De La Salle College, Revesby Heights, in Sydney, New South Wales
- James Sheahan Catholic High School, in Orange, New South Wales
- LaSalle Catholic College, Bankstown, in Sydney, New South Wales
- La Salle College, in Perth, Western Australia
- Oakhill College, in Castle Hill, Sydney, New South Wales
- O'Connor Catholic College, in Armidale, New South Wales
- Saint Michael's College, in Adelaide, South Australia
- Saint Bede's College, in Mentone, Victoria
- St Bede's Bentleigh, in East Bentleigh, Victoria
- Saint John's Regional College, in Dandenong, Victoria

Former Lasallian schools in Australia

- BoysTown Beaudesert, Queensland 1961–2001, closed after sex abuse scandal
- De La Salle College, Ashfield, Sydney, New South Wales (1916–2022)
- De La Salle College Coogee, Sydney, New South Wales (1946–1963)
- De La Salle College Cootamundra, New South Wales (1913–1977)
- De La Salle College, Orange, New South Wales (1928–1977)

=== New Zealand ===
- De La Salle College, in Auckland
- Francis Douglas Memorial College, in New Plymouth
- John Paul College, in Rotorua

=== Papua New Guinea ===
- De La Salle High School, Bomana, near Port Moresby
- Lasalle Technical College – Hohola (Formerly HYDC), Port Moresby
- Jubilee Catholic Secondary School, Port Moresby
- Sacred Heart Teachers College, Bomana
- Mainohana Catholic High School, Bereina

== South America ==
=== Argentina ===
- La Salle Buenos Aires, in Buenos Aires City
- La Salle Florida, in Buenos Aires Province
- La Salle San Martín, in Buenos Aires Province
- San Juan Bautista De La Salle Pilar, in Buenos Aires Province
- Santo Tomás de Aquino, in González Catán, Buenos Aires Province
- San Martín de Porres, in José León Suárez, Buenos Aires Province
- Casa Joven, in González Catán, Buenos Aires Province
- La Salle Paraná, Provincia de Entre Ríos
- Escuela Niño Jesús, in San Martín
- La Salle Pigüé
- La Salle Argüello, in Córdoba
- San José, in Villa del Rosario
- La Salle San Héctor Valdivielso, Malvinas Argentinas, Córdoba
- La Salle Rosario, Santa Fé
- La Salle Jobson, in Santa Fé, Santa Fé

=== Bolivia ===
- Colegio La Salle, in La Paz
- Colegio La Salle, in Santa Cruz
- Colegio La Salle, in Cochabamba
- Colegio La Salle, in Tarija
- Colegio La Salle, in Beni
- Colegio La Salle, in Pando
- Colegio La Salle, in Oruro
- Universidad La Salle, in La Paz

=== Brazil ===
- Colegio La Salle in Canoas (State: Rio Grande do Sul)
- Colegio La Salle in Carazinho (State: Rio Grande do Sul)
- Colegio La Salle Carmo in Caxias do Sul (State: Rio Grande do Sul)
- Colegio La Salle in Caxias do Sul (State: Rio Grande do Sul)
- Colegio La Salle in Dores (State: Rio Grande do Sul)
- Colegio La Salle in Esmeralda (State: Rio Grande do Sul)
- Colegio La Salle in Esteio (State: Rio Grande do Sul)
- Colegio La Salle in Hipólito Leite (State: Rio Grande do Sul)
- Colegio La Salle in Medianeira (State: Rio Grande do Sul)
- Colegio La Salle in Pão dos Pobres (State: Rio Grande do Sul)
- Colegio La Salle in Santo Antônio (State: Rio Grande do Sul)
- Colegio La Salle in São João (State: Rio Grande do Sul)
- Colegio La Salle in Sapucaia (State: Rio Grande do Sul)
- Unilasalle in Canoas (State: Rio Grande do Sul)
- Faculdade La Salle in Estrela (State: Rio Grande do Sul)
- Colegio La Salle in Peperi (State: Santa Catarina)
- Colegio La Salle in Xanxerê (State: Santa Catarina)
- Colegio La Salle in Pato Branco (State: Parana)
- Colegio La Salle in Toledo (State: Parana)
- Colegio La Salle in Curitiba (State: Parana)
- Colegio La Salle in Brasília (Distrito Federal)
- Colegio La Salle in Águas Claras (Distrito Federal)
- Colegio La Salle in Núcleo Bandeirante (Distrito Federal)
- Colegio La Salle in Sobradinho (Distrito Federal)
- Colegio La Salle in Lucas do Rio Verde (State: Mato Grosso)
- Faculdade La Salle in Lucas do Rio Verde (State: Mato Grosso)
- Colegio La Salle in Rondonópolis (State: Mato Grosso)
- Faculdade La Salle in Lucas (State: Mato Grosso)
- Colegio La Salle in Botucatu (State: São Paulo)
- Colegio La Salle in São Carlos (State: São Paulo)
- Colegio La Salle in São Paulo (State: São Paulo)
- Colegio La Salle in Niterói (State: Rio de Janeiro)
- Colegio Instituto ABEL in Niterói (State: Rio de Janeiro)
- Unilasalle in Niterói (State: Rio de Janeiro)
- Colegio La Salle in Manaus (State: Amazonas)
- Faculdade La Salle in Manaus (State: Amazonas)
- Colegio La Salle in Augustinópolis (State: Tocantins)

=== Chile ===
- Colegio La Salle, in Santiago
- Colegio San Gregorio de La Salle, in Santiago
- Escuela San Lázaro, in Santiago
- Instituto La Salle, in Santiago
- Colegio La Salle, in Talca
- Colegio La Salle, in Temuco
- Escuela Francia, in Temuco

=== Colombia ===
- Institución Educativa Nacional Dante Alighieri, San Vicente del Caguán
- Colegio San José de La Salle (first Lasallian school in Colombia, 1890), in Medellín
- Colegio De La Salle, in Cúcuta
- Colegio De La Salle, in Cartagena
- Colegio Bifi La Salle, in Barranquilla
- Instituto La Salle, in Barranquilla
- Colegio De San Carlos, in Medellín
- Colegio De La Salle, in Montería
- Colegio De La Salle, in Pereira
- Colegio De La Salle, in Bucaramanga
- Colegio De La Salle, in Villavicencio
- Colegio De La Salle, in Orocue
- Colegio De La Salle, in Bogotá
- Colegio De La Salle, in Bello
- Colegio De La Salle, in Envigado
- Colegio San Carlos, in Medellín
- Universidad Lasallista, in Caldas
- Colegio La Salle De Bello, in Bello
- I.E.D. La Salle, in Zipaquirá
- Instituto Tecnico Central, in Bogotá
- Liceo Hermano Miguel, in Bogotá
- Academia La Salle San Benildo, in Bogotá
- Universidad de La Salle, in Bogotá
- San José de la Salle school Medellín
- Instituto Politécnico Álvaro Gonzalez Santana, in Sogamoso

=== Ecuador ===
- Unidad Educativa La Salle, in Conocoto, Municipality of Quito
- Unidad Educativa San José – La Salle, in Guayaquil
- Unidad Educativa San-Jose La Salle, in Latacunga
- Unidad Educativa Francisco Febres Cordero La Salle, Quito
- Unidad Educativa Santo Hermano Miguel La Salle, Quito
- Unidad Educativa San Alfonso del Hierro La Salle, Quito
- Unidad Educativa El Cebolllar La Salle, Quito
- Unidad Educativa La Salle, Cuenca
- Unidad Educativa La Salle, Azogues

=== Paraguay ===
- Escuela Jose Maria Bogarin, Santisima Trinidad, Asunción
- San Isidro Labrador, Pozo Colorado.
- Instituto de Formación Docente Diocesano, Capiibary

=== Peru ===
- Colegio La Salle in Lima
- Colegio "Fe y Alegría" Nº 43 in Lima
- Colegio Hno. Noe Zevallos Ortega in Lima
- Colegio De La Salle in Arequipa
- C.E.E. San Juan Bautista De La Salle in Arequipa
- C.E.P. San José - La Salle Cusco
- Instituto Superior Tecnológico Pedagógico. La Salle - Urubamba, Cusco
- Instituto Superior Pedagógico Público, Loreto, Iquitos
- Instituto Superior Pedagógico "Fray Lorenzo Pascual Alegre", Requena, Iquitos
- Instituto Superior Tecnológico "Manos Unidas", Requena, Iquitos
- Centro Educativo Ocupacional "Manos Unidas", Requena, Iquitos
- Centro Educativo Primario - Secundario Mixto (Anexo Al I.S.P.), Requena, Iquitos

=== Venezuela ===
- Colegio La Salle La Colina, in Caracas
- Colegio La Salle Tienda Honda, in Caracas
- Colegio La Salle Guaparo, in Valencia
- Colegio La Salle Los Taladros, in Valencia
- Colegio La Salle, in Barquisimeto
- Unidad Educativa Colegio Pre-artesanal Hermano Juan, in Barquisimeto
- Colegio La Salle, in Mérida
- E.T.I. Fundación La Salle, in San Félix
- IUTMAR, in Punta de Piedras
- Colegio San Jose La Salle, in Puerto Cabello, Carabobo
- U.E. Felicita Baloche, in Puerto Cabello, Carabobo

== Sexual abuse cases ==
There have been a number of cases of institutional sexual and physical abuse of children, many over a period of several decades, in Lasallian educational institutions in several countries. Some branches of the De La Salle Brothers admitted to these cases, and issued apologies publicly and to victims. The Northern Ireland Historical Institutional Abuse Inquiry in its report on physical and sexual abuse at the De La Salle Boys' Home at Rubane House considered "the extent and frequency of the abuse was such that it was systemic" and that "the [La Salle] Order's failings to properly investigate allegations of sexual abuse and to properly report them to relevant authorities and its failure to take proper steps to protect children from further sexual abuse" amounted to "a systemic failure to take appropriate steps to ensure the investigation and prosecution of criminal offences involving abuse".

On 11 March 2022 ministers from the five main political parties in Northern Ireland and six abusing institutions made statements of apology in the Northern Ireland Assembly.

The six institutions that apologised for carrying out abuse were De La Salle Brothers, represented by Br Francis Manning; the Sisters of Nazareth, represented bySr Cornelia Walsh; the Sisters of St Louis represented by Sr Uainin Clarke; theGood Shepherd Sisters, represented by Sr Cait O'Leary; Barnardo's in Northern Ireland, represented by Michele Janes; and Irish Church Missions, represented by Rev Mark Jones. In live reporting after the apology, BBC News reported that Jon McCourt from Survivors North West said "If what happened today was the best that the church could offer by way of an apology they failed miserably. There was no emotion, there was no ownership. ... I don't believe that the church and institutions atoned today." He called on the intuitions to "do the right thing" and contribute to the redress fund for survivors, saying that institutions have done similar for people in Scotland. McCourt praised the government ministers' apologies; they had "sat and thought out and listened to what it was we said.", but said that the institutions had failed to do this, leading to some victims having to leave the room while they were speaking, "compound[ing] the hurt." Others angry at the institutions' apologies included Caroline Farry, who attended St Joseph's Training School in Middletown from 1978 to 1981, overseen by nuns from the Sisters of St Louis, Pádraigín Drinan from Survivors of Abuse, and Alice Harper, whose brother, a victim of the De La Salle Brothers, had since died. Peter Murdock, from campaign group Savia, was at Nazareth Lodge Orphanage with his brother (who had recently died); he likened the institution to an "SS camp". He said "It's shocking to hear a nun from the institution apologising ... it comes 30 years too late ... people need to realise that it has to come from the heart. They say it came from the heart but why did they not apologise 30 years ago?"
