= College des Freres =

Collège des Frères may refer to any of several schools in the Middle East:

- Collège des Frères (Bab al-Louq), a La Sallian school in Cairo, Egypt
- Collège Mariste Champville, a school in Lebanon
- Collège des Frères, the name of several Lasallian educational institutions in Israel and Palestine
