= University of Monterrey =

Private university in Nuevo León, Mexico

- Universidad de Monterrey
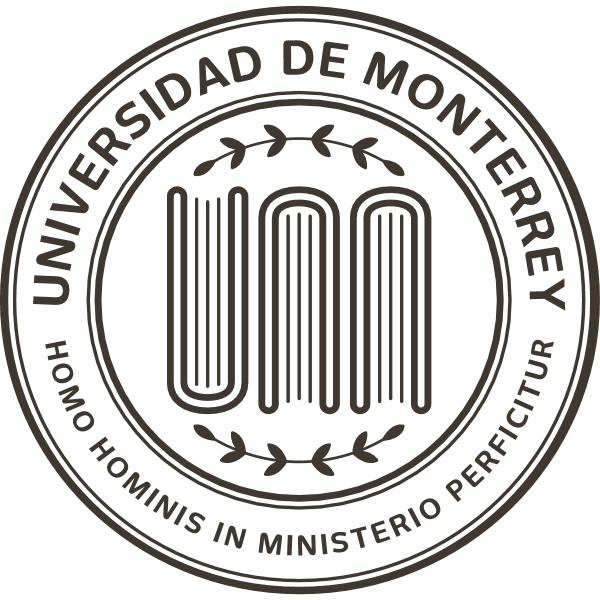
- Other names: UDEM
- Motto: Homo Hominis In Ministerio Perficitur
- Motto in English: The man is only realized at the service of the man
- Type: Private Catholic secondary and higher education institution
- Established: July 8, 1969; 56 years ago
- Religious affiliation: Roman Catholic
Academic affiliations
AMBA ANUIES ISQOLS ASQ	NAFSA IIE Compostela Group of Universities
- President: Álvaro Fernández Garza
- Vice-president: List: Carlos García González (VP for Higher Education); Eduardo García Luna Martínez (VP for Health Sciences); María del Roble Garza Treviño (VP for High School Education); Carlos Basurto Meza (VP for Liaising, Effectiveness, and Academic Services); Isabella Navarro Grueter (VP for Whole-Person Education); Patricio de la Garza Cadena (VP for Administration); Luis Iturralde Siller (VP for Development); Susana Cuilty Siller (VP for Strategic Transformation)
- Rector: Mario Paez
- Students: 19,042 (2025)
- Undergraduates: 10,253
- Postgraduates: 537
- Other students: 1,533 (Medical Specialties); 3,780 (High School Students); 7 (Doctorate)
- Location: San Pedro Garza Garcia, Nuevo León, Mexico; 25.66096760°N 100.42035870°W
- Campus: Urban, 350,000 m²
- Colors: Yellow and Black
- Nickname: Troyanos (Trojans)
- Website: www.udem.edu.mx/en
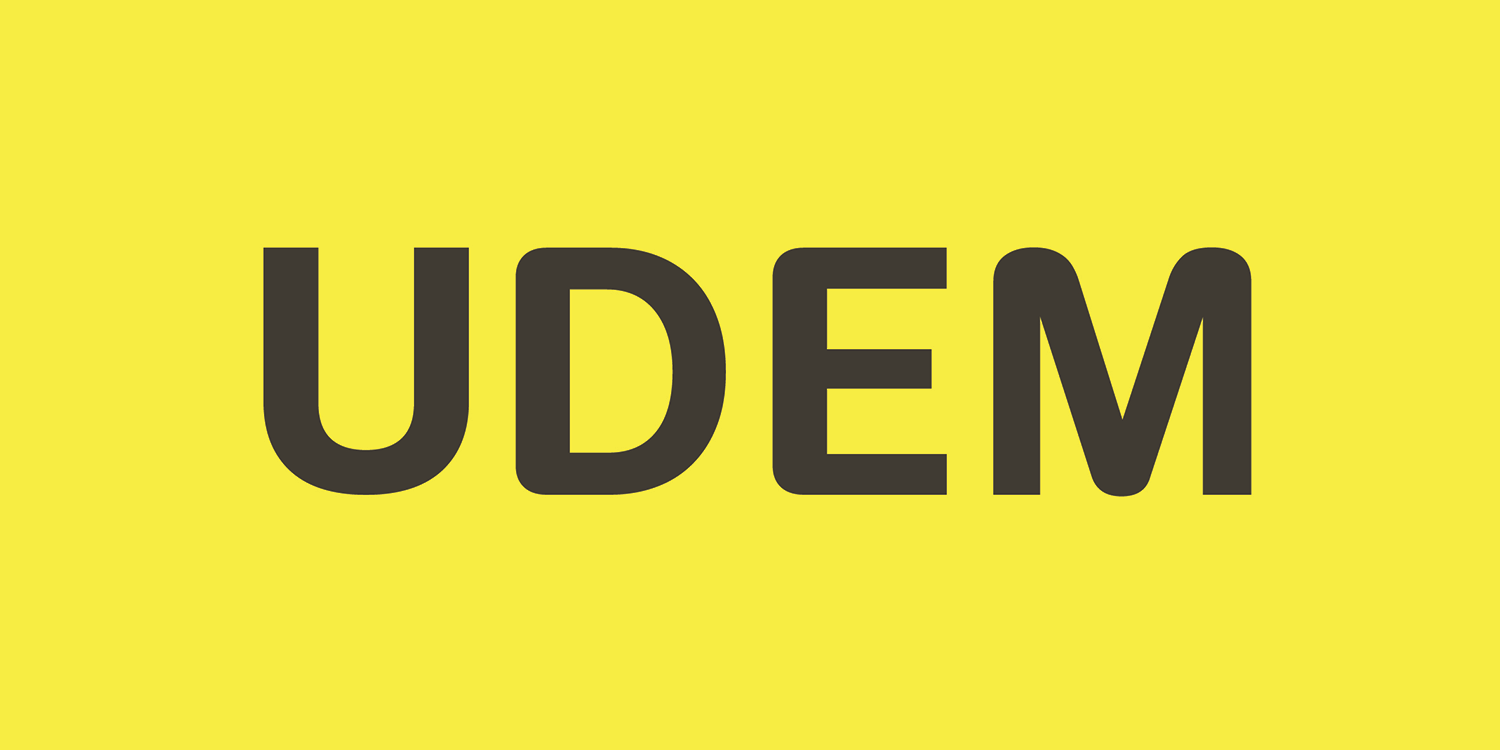

The University of Monterrey (Spanish: Universidad de Monterrey, acronym "UDEM") is a private, Catholic, secondary, and higher education institution in city-municipality San Pedro Garza García, Greater Monterrey, Nuevo León, Mexico.

== History ==
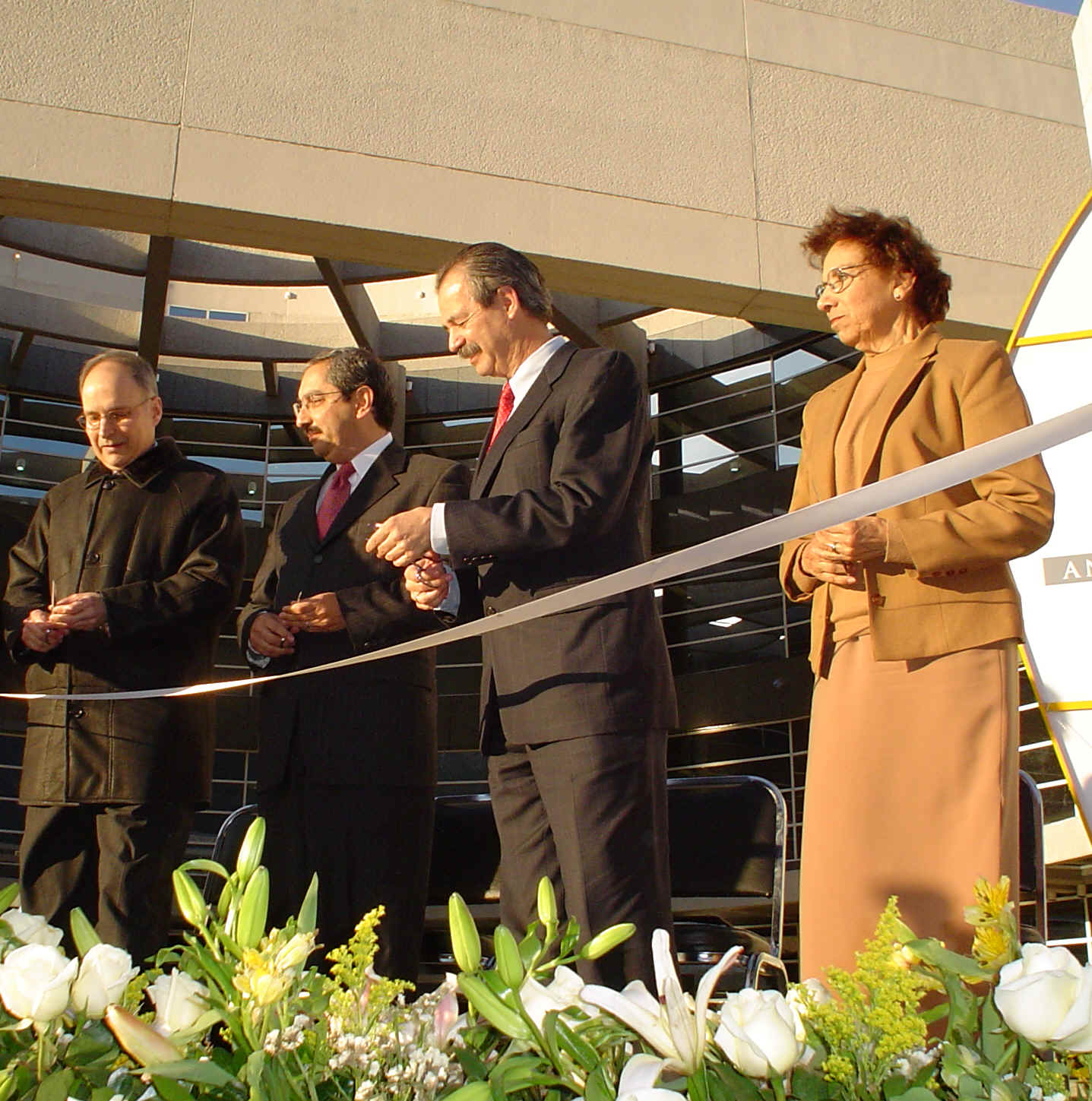
Inauguration of the Rector's Building

UDEM was founded by the Daughters of the Immaculate Mary of Guadalupe, the nuns of the Sacred Heart, the Marist Brothers, and the La Salle Brothers, and was supported by an association of Catholic citizens. The university originated from a recommendation given by the Second Vatican Council to use educational activities in favor of teaching the principles of the Catholic doctrine.

The Society of the Sacred Heart of Jesus had worked in Monterrey since 1908, and the Sisters of Immaculate Mary of Guadalupe established Labastida Unity in 1951. They had been running Labastida College, an all-girls school, since 1919. Brothers had been working in Monterrey since 1905, teachers who had left Monterrey during the Revolutionary War, returned in 1942, to establish the Instituto Regiomontano.

On July 8, 1969, the university was recognized by the state of Nuevo Leon, and on September 8 of the same year, it began operating as an educational institution housed in five different facilities.

Philanthropist Roberto Garza Sada started searching for educators and land, bought the campus property, and gave money to start building the university. Later, in honoring her father, Margarita Garza Sada (Daughter of Roberto Garza Sada) and Japanese Architect Tadao Ando gave the money to build the Centro Roberto Garza Sada for Architecture and Design.

By 1972, UDEM had 22 majors and 3 baccalaureate degree programs. That same year, 7 more academic divisions were created, amongst which were the Arts and Media Sciences, Education, Economics, Law, Mathematics, Health Studies and Social Studies. In 1979, Mexican philanthropist Roberto Garza Sada formed the Association for Educational Development, which sole purpose was to buy 35 acres of land on which they would build the actual campus for UDEM.

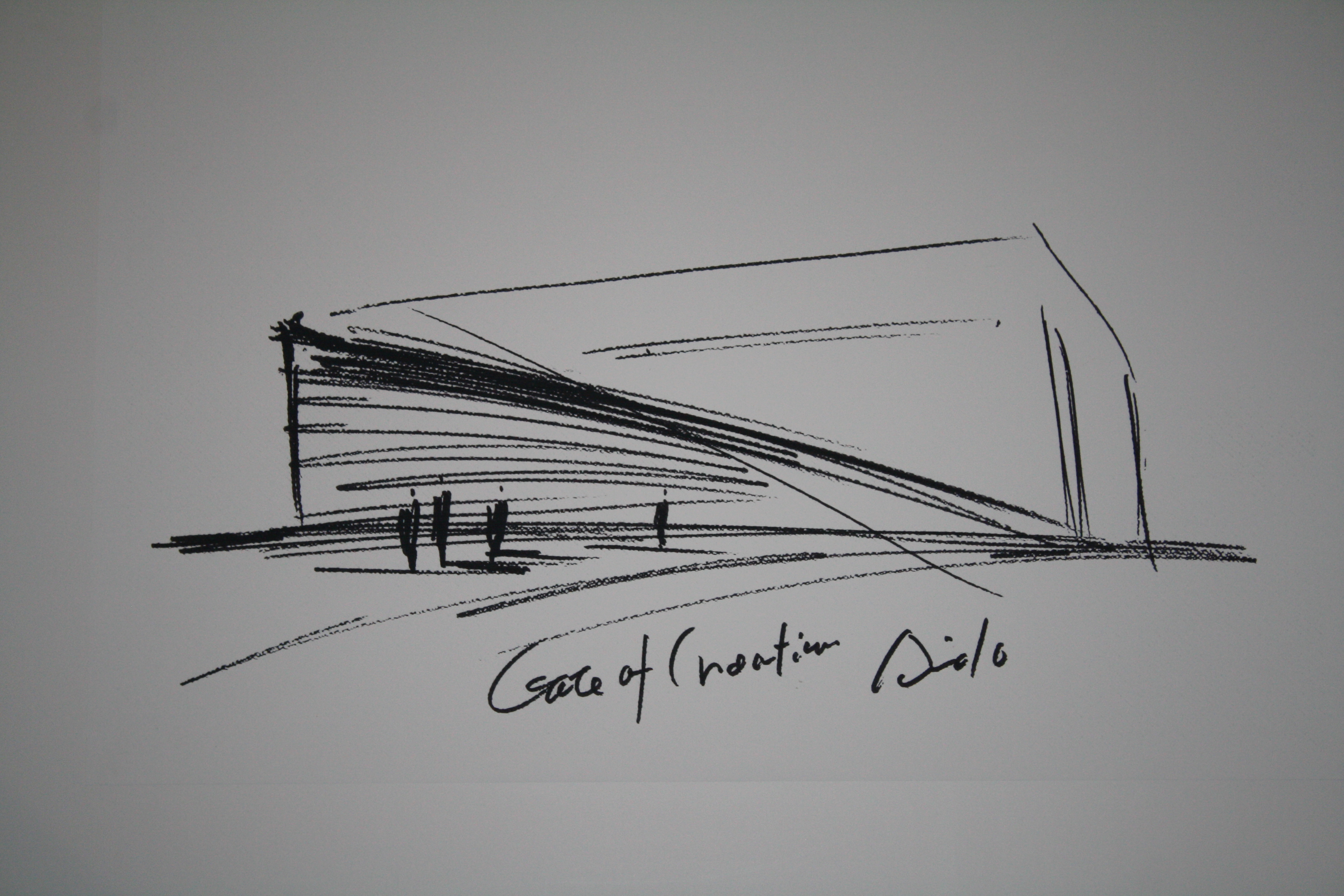
Drafts of the Gate of Creation

In 1982, activities at the Humberto Lobo UDEM high school began. On August 21, 1998, the college community center was inaugurated in the presence of then-Mexican President Ernesto Zedillo. In January 2004, the Rector's building was constructed, which houses the dean's offices, the Center for Information and Student Attention (Centro de Información y Atención a Alumnos; CIAA), among other facilities. In July 2006, the new student dormitories were inaugurated. In 2009, after 16 years of being the dean of UDEM, Francisco Ascúnaga Guerra resigned from his position and was succeeded by Antonio Dieck Assad, the current dean.

In 2002, UDEM signed 26 new bilateral agreements with universities in the United States – such as the University of California, Berkeley, and other universities in Spain, Italy, Belgium, England (such as University College, London), Germany, and France (such as the Lycée Bossuet-Notre Dame, in Paris).

== Seal ==
In 2014, UDEM evolved its graphic identity. In the highest point has the university name: "Universidad de Monterrey", the circles contain the Latin phrase that currently serves as the University's motto. This phrase Homo Hominis In Ministerio Perficitur when translated means, "Man is perfected in the service of man," and the mirrored laurels.

== Campus ==
The primary UDEM campus is located in San Pedro Garza Garcia, Nuevo Leon, Mexico. The university has four preparatory locations (translated as units from the Spanish word for Unidades). The first, San Pedro Campus(USP), being part of the primary campus. The Valle Alto Campus (UVA) is located in Estanzuela, Monterrey, Nuevo Leon, Mexico. The Fundadores Campus (UFU) is located in Escobedo, Nuevo Leon, Mexico. And the Obispado Campus (UNO) is located in the Monterrey area. In addition, nursing degrees are offered on Campus Christus Health Muguerza Conchita Hospital.

=== Rector's Building and CIAA ===
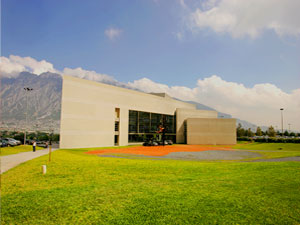
CIAA and Rector's building

In September 2001, after 10 years of planning, construction began on the rector's building, which is over 27,000 ft^{2}. The building also houses the CIAA or Center for Information and Student Attention as translated intto English. The building was inaugurated in 2003. Local architect Bernardo Hinojosa oversaw the project.

The building also houses the vice-rectory for high school education, college education, development, and administrative departments. A red and black sculpture called La Serpentina adorns the main plaza of the building, it was created by Fernando González Gortázar, an artist from Guadalajara. The red color symbolizes the warmth of human beings and is the flame within all of us to succeed.

=== CCU ===
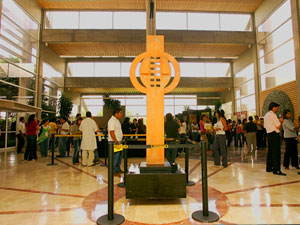
CCU

Inaugurated in 1999 by former Mexican President Ernesto Zedillo, CCU stands for Centro de la Comunidad Universitaria and translates to College Community Center. The CCU is a recreational area for students which also houses the Culture department (in charge of all artistic events within the University or by the University's alumni), the Pastoral Care department, the student council headquarters, a small chapel, the cafeteria, the music rooms, an auditorium, a common room, and the film club.

=== Library ===
In 1987, the library system of UDEM was consolidated and operates from the main/central library located at UDEM's campus and three other department libraries found in UDEM's preparatories. Through collective bargaining with 44 local and national institutions, UDEM's library has 222,524 volumes of books, videos, and e-books, a collection of 408,589 academic journals (in both press and on-line), a database of 23,234 archived documents from institutions such as EBSCO, ProQuest, Wilson, Infolatina, Britannica, Ocenet, Gale and Routledge.

The library's collection includes Colección Xavier Moyssén which deals with Mexican Art History and is restricted to authorized personnel, and INEGI's Library.

=== Centro Roberto Garza Sada (CRGS) ===
The Roberto Garza Sada Center (CRGS), named in honor of Don Roberto Garza Sada, was designed by architect Tadao Ando. The final investment of the work is around 45 million dollars. With 21 million coming from Doña Márgara Garza Sada de Fernández, daughter of Roberto Garza Sada. CRGS, baptized by its author as the "Gate of Creation", was officially inaugurated on April 29, 2013, in the presence of Tadao Ando, Doña Márgara Garza Sada de Fernández, the Governor in charge, Rodrigo Medina de la Cruz, the former municipal president of San Pedro Garza García, Mauricio Fernández Garza, among other business, political and academic personalities.

The building has 1,300 cubic meters of concrete and 13,115.48 square meters of construction. The building includes 22 laboratories and workshops for design students. Currently, it has the "Silver" level LEED Certification, granted by the US Green Building Council (USGBC), becoming the first work of Tadao Ando to receive a global sustainability certification.

=== ESTOA ===
The building, inaugurated in May 2019 by the Mexican architect Tatiana Bilbao, is located to the west of the campus and has approximately 90 thousand square meters of construction, which accommodates student and coexistence areas and UDEM offices for customer service, in addition to Continuing Education rooms.

=== El Solar ===
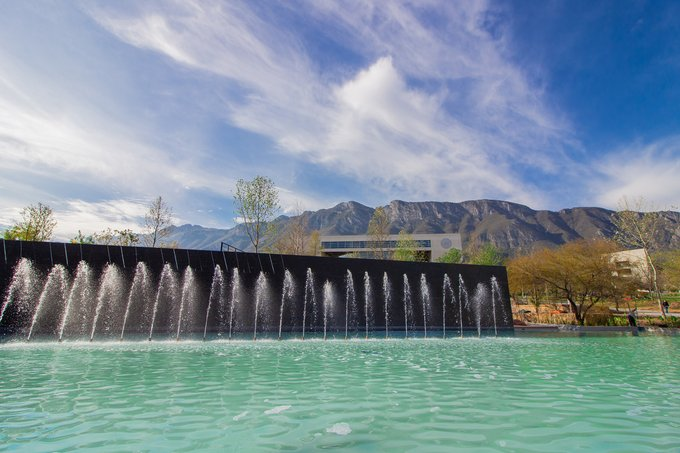
El Solar UDEM

It covers the construction of a South Plaza, currently in use, and a North Plaza or Cultural Plaza –on the western side of the project–, which together represent 7,900 m2 for the meeting and coexistence of the UDEM community, in addition to the area of the ravine - the east side.

=== Radio station UDEM ===
On September 8, 1994, the first transmission of Radio UDEM, the 90.5 FM station with only 1000 watts of power, was conducted. However, in 2005, they increased capacity to 3,000 watts of power with which its usual programming stretched to year-round transmissions. From 2006, they began transmitting over the Internet.

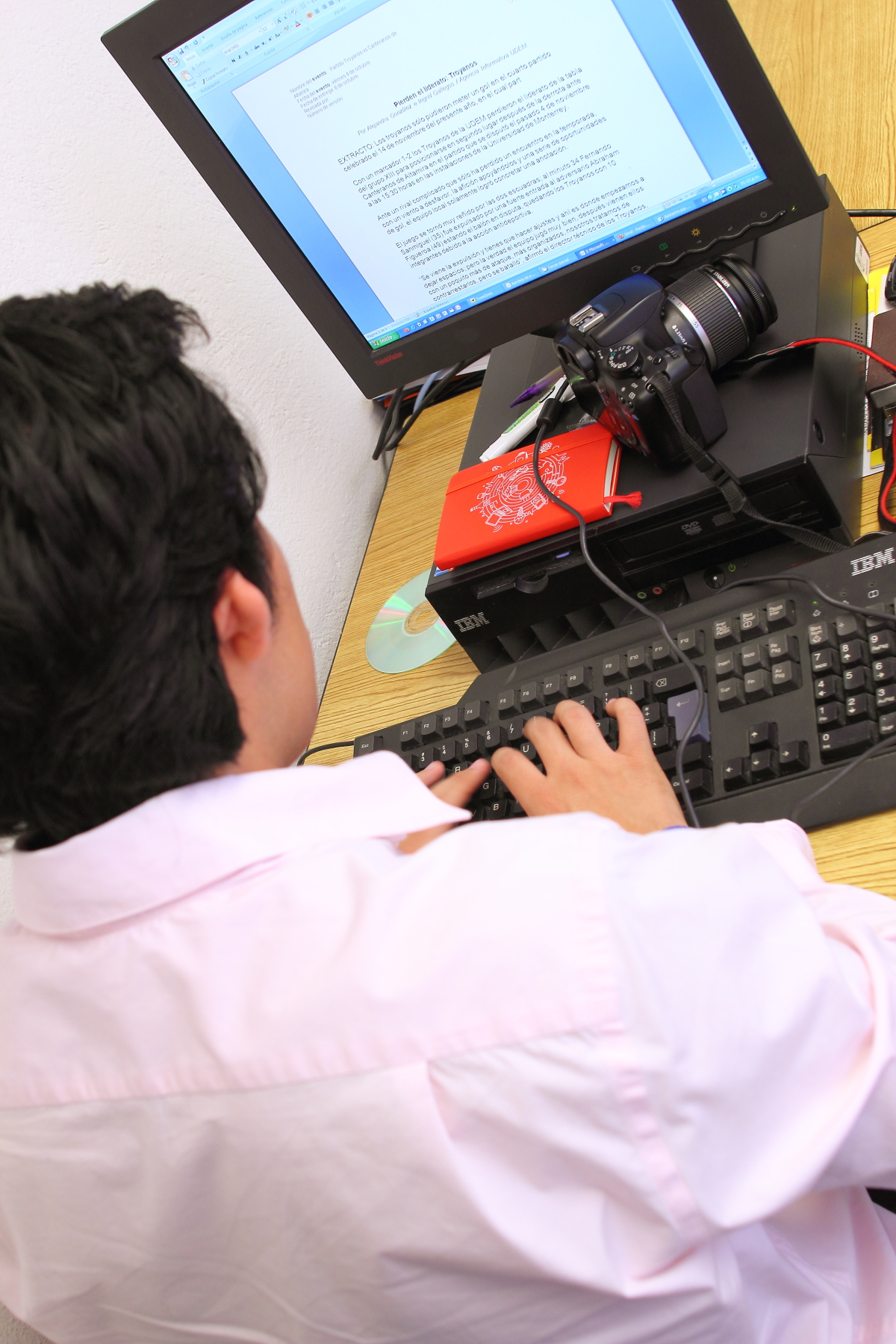
Redacting Computer

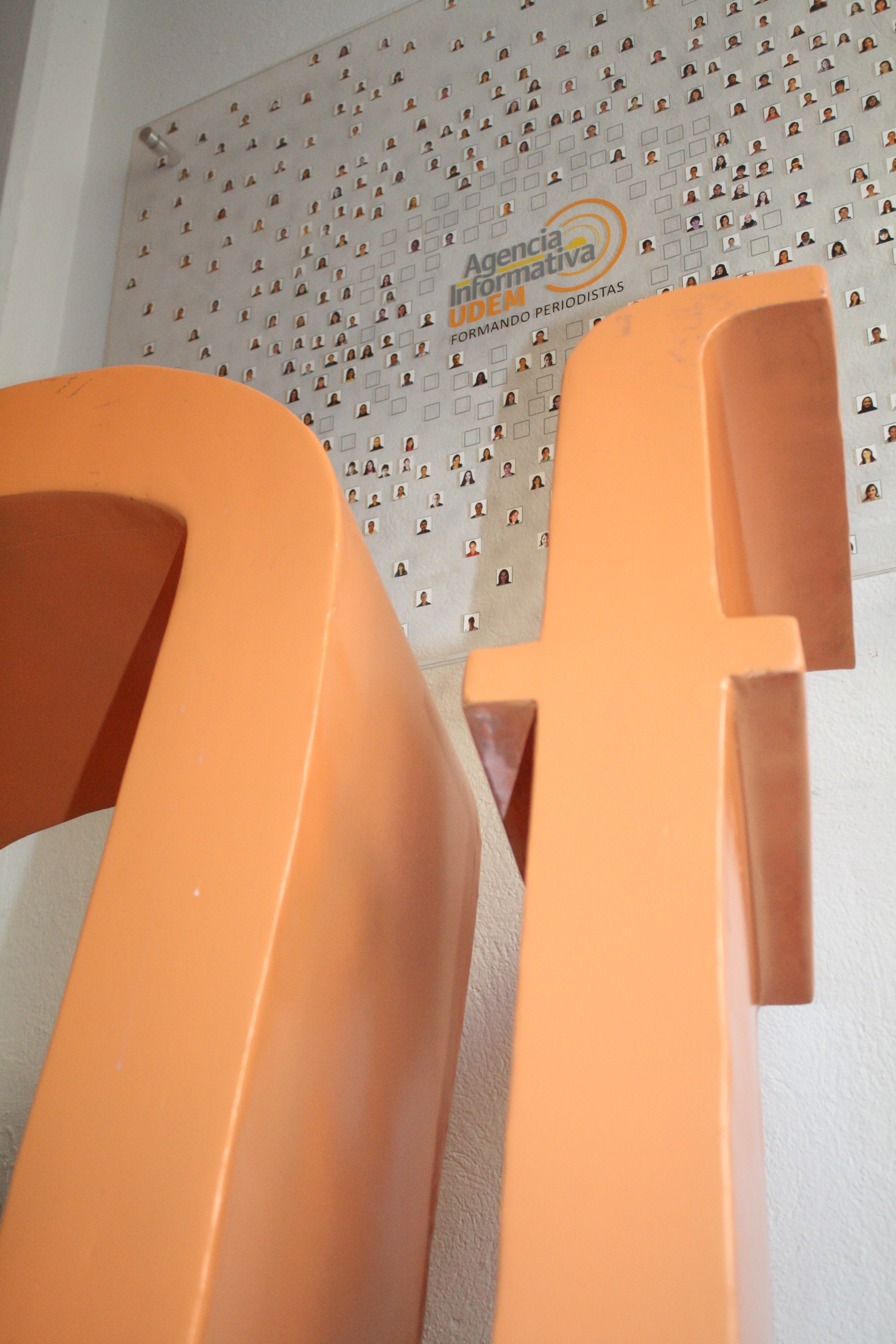
Student Pictures and Lobby of the Agency

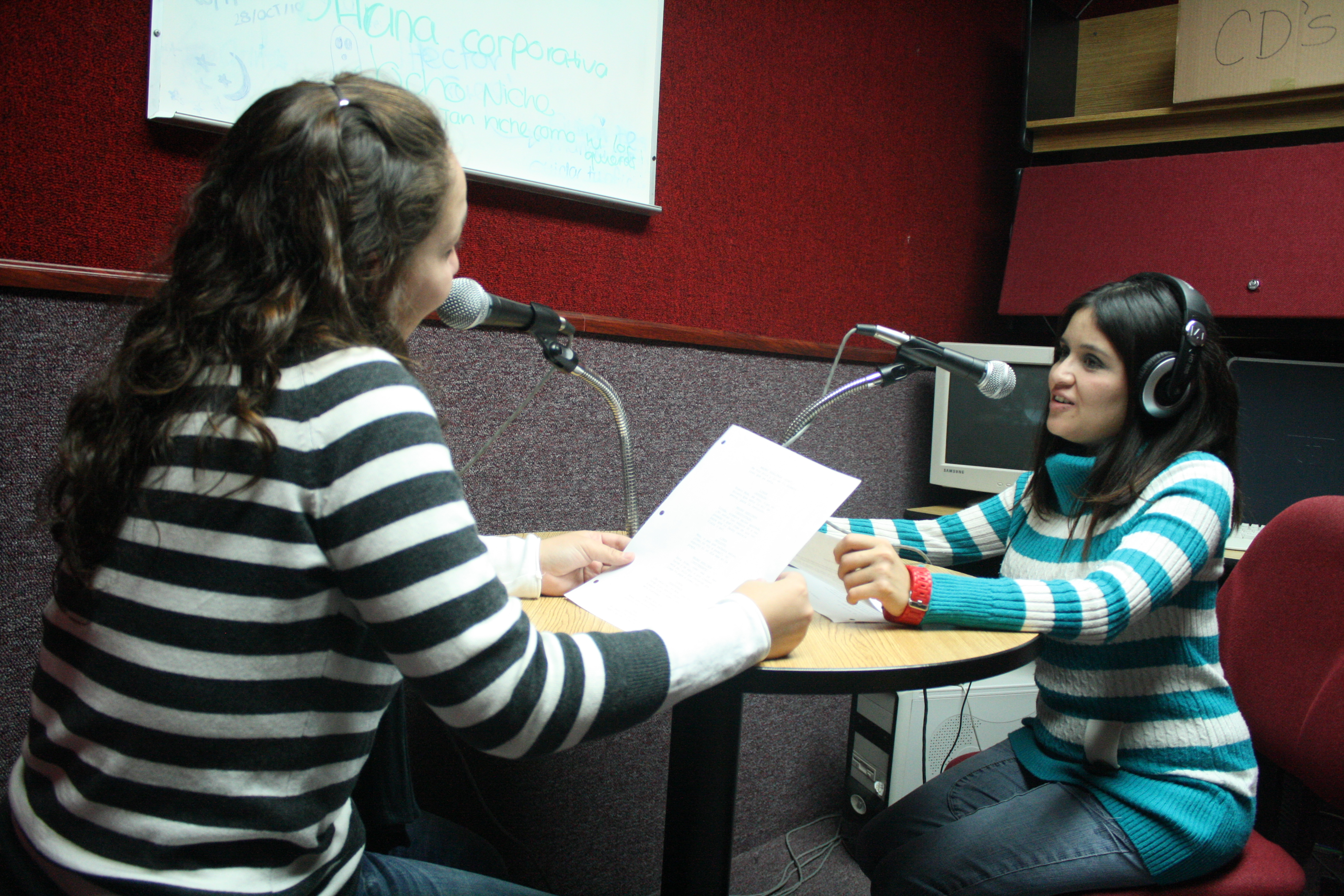
News Radio Station

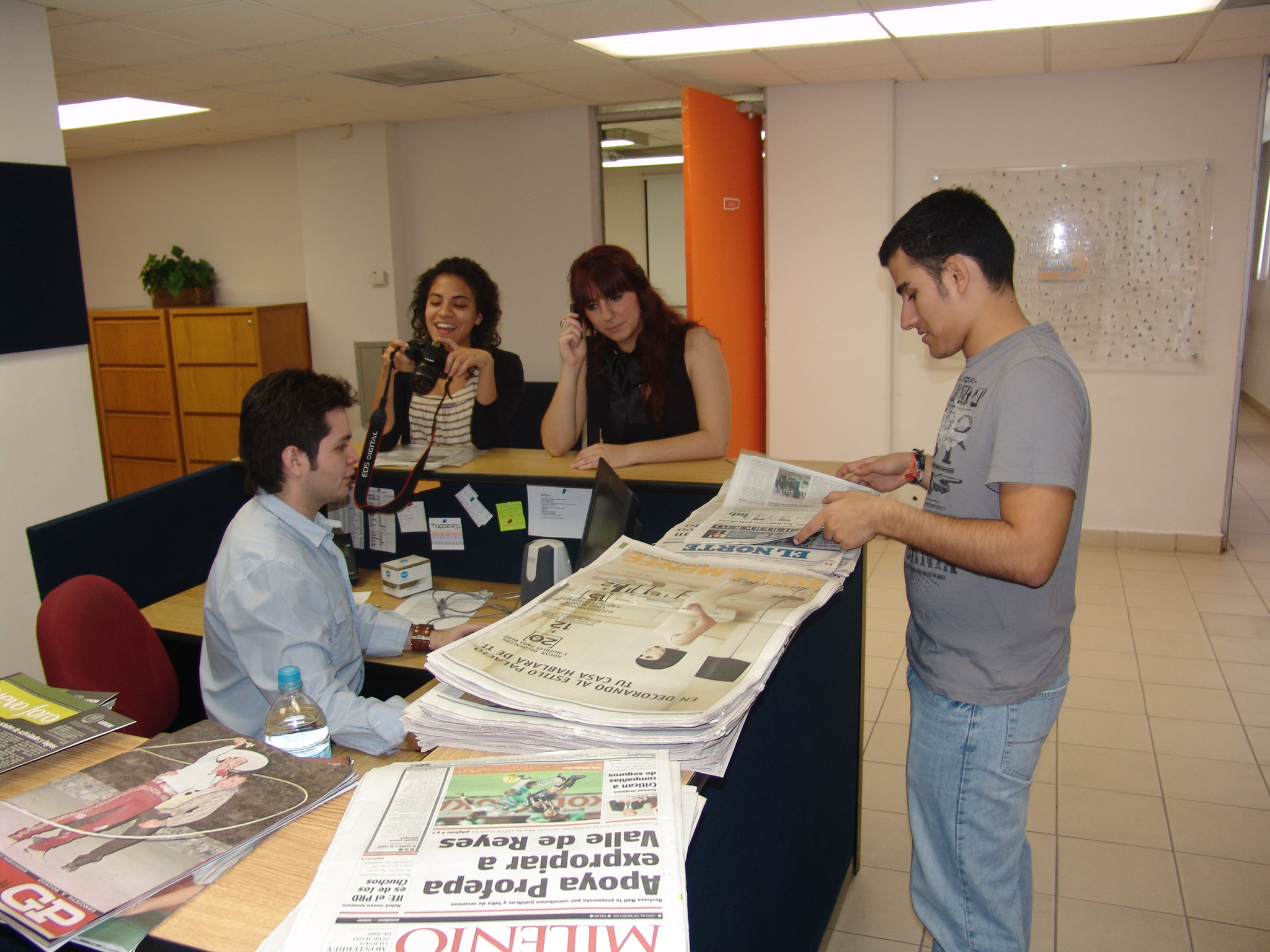
Front Desk at the Agency

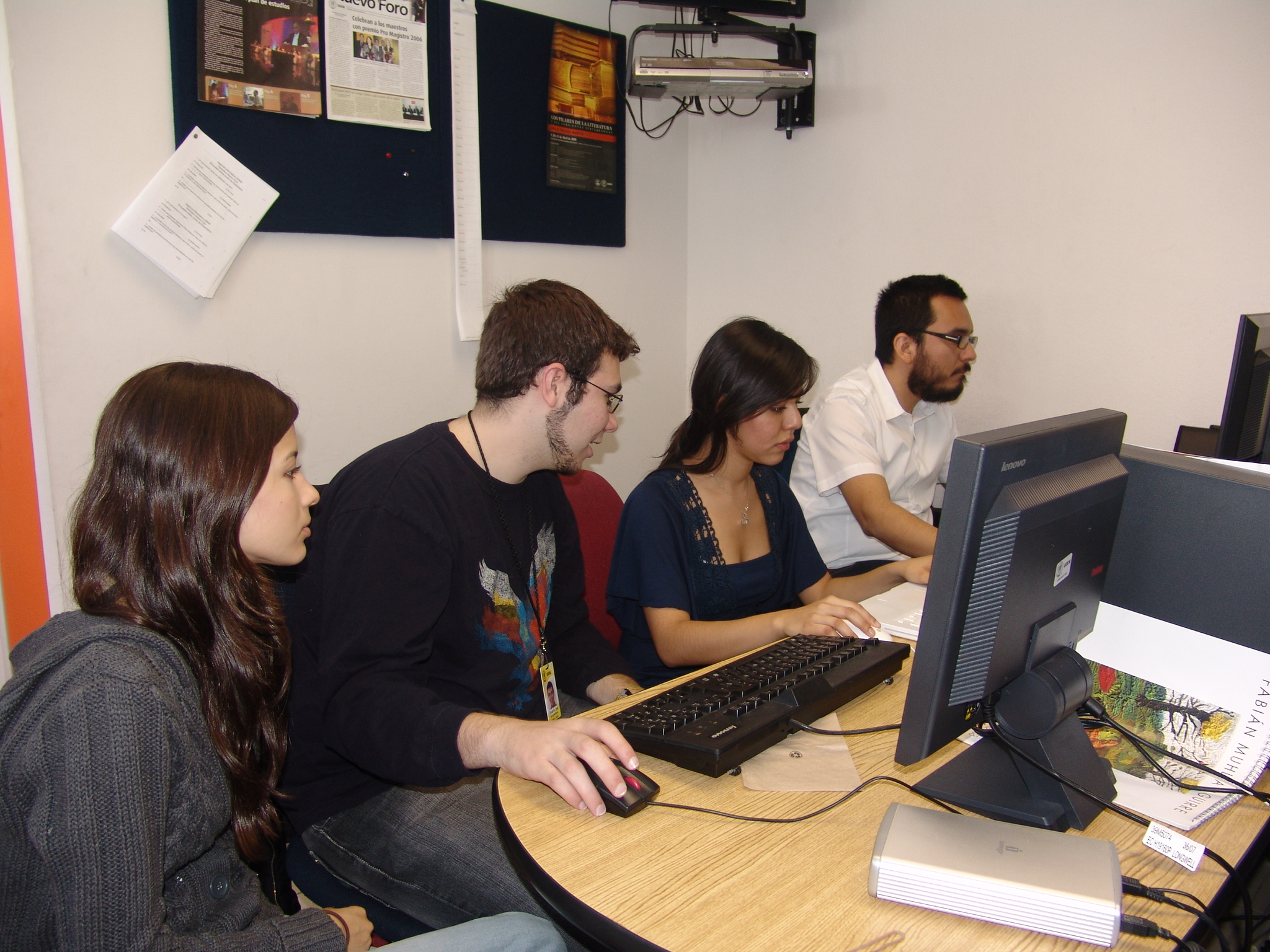
Journalism Class

Centro de Medios (CEDEM)

The Center for Mass Media doubles as the classroom and practice center where students learn how to operate a radio broadcast, a live television broadcast and cinematography. Inaugurated in 1990, it featuries 5 video editing modules, personal HD cameras, wireless microphones, professional lighting, television format cameras with a prompter, and a television studio.

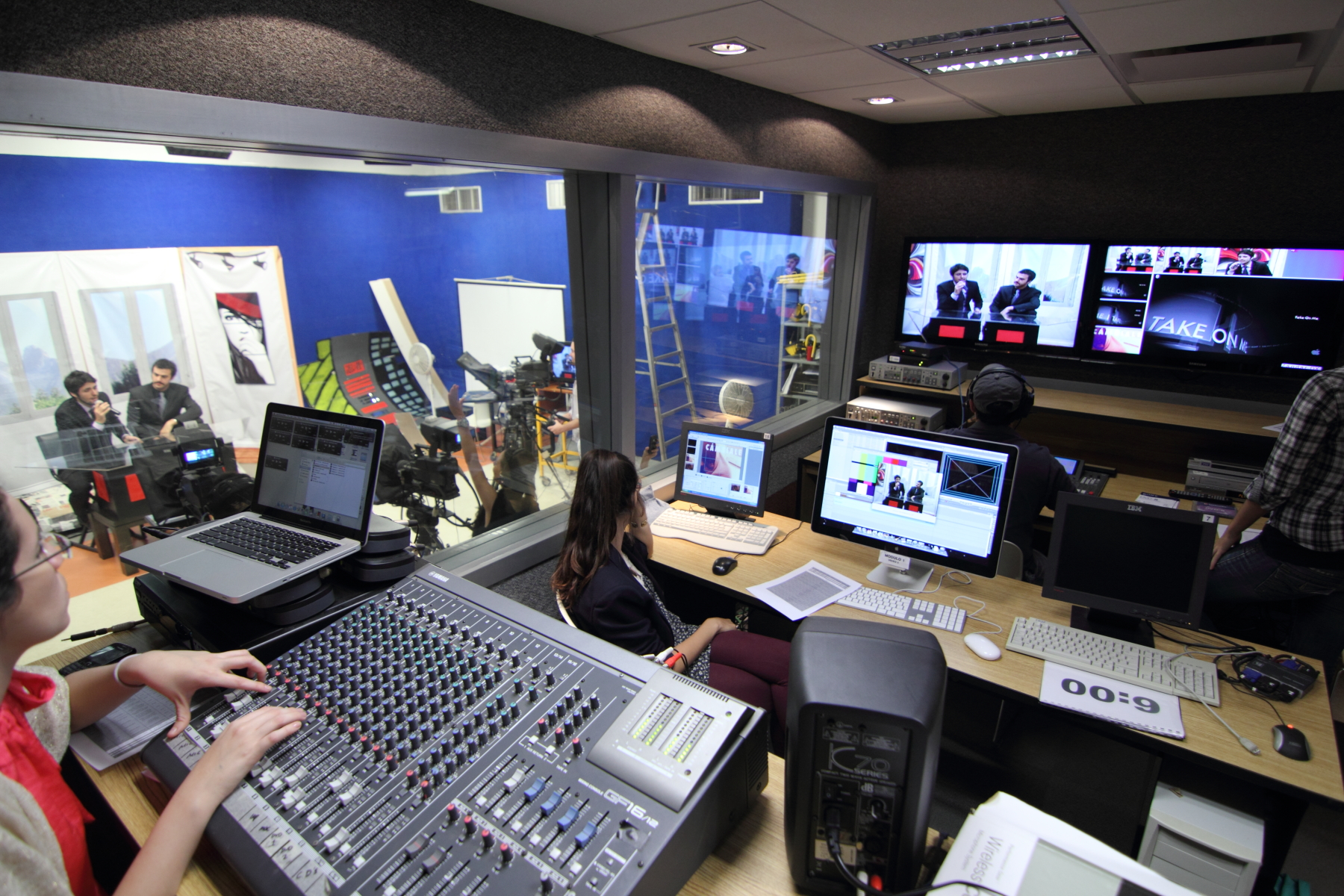
Television production cabin.

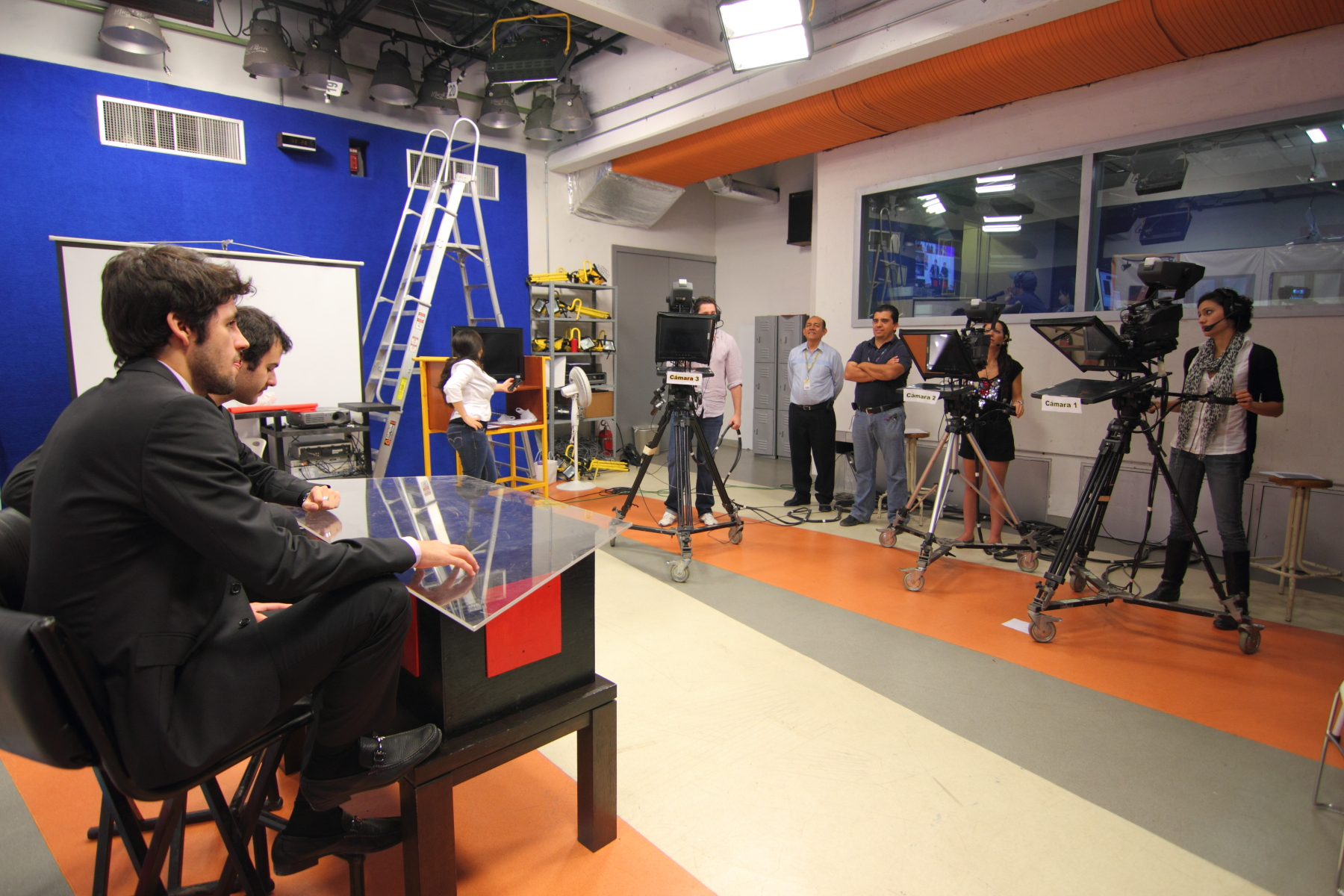
Television set.

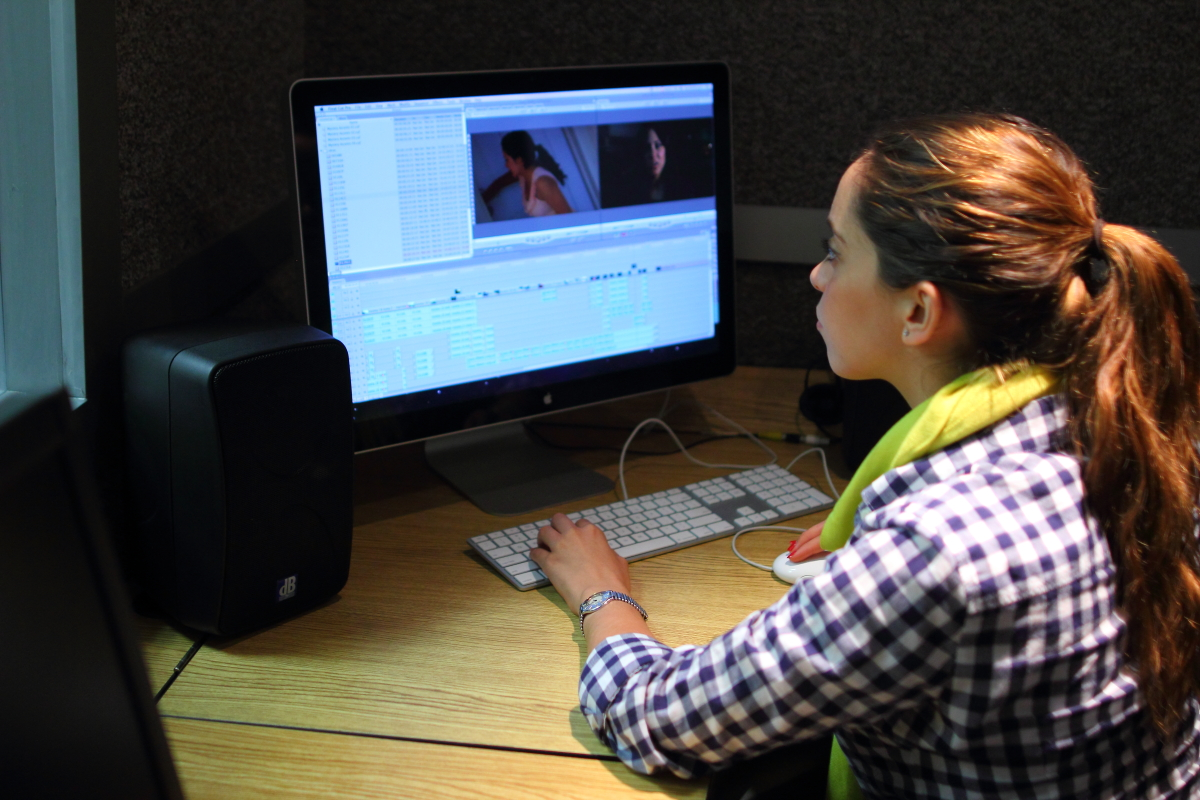
Video editing module.

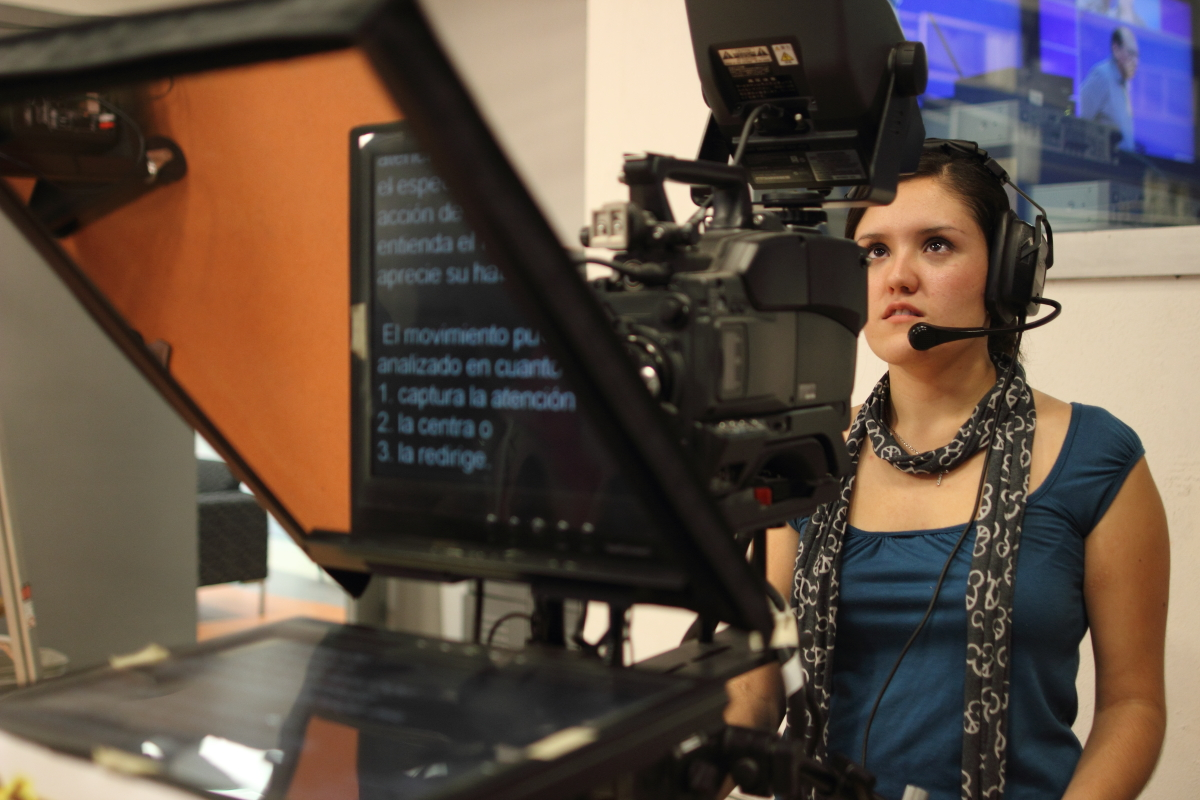
Television format camera with prompter.

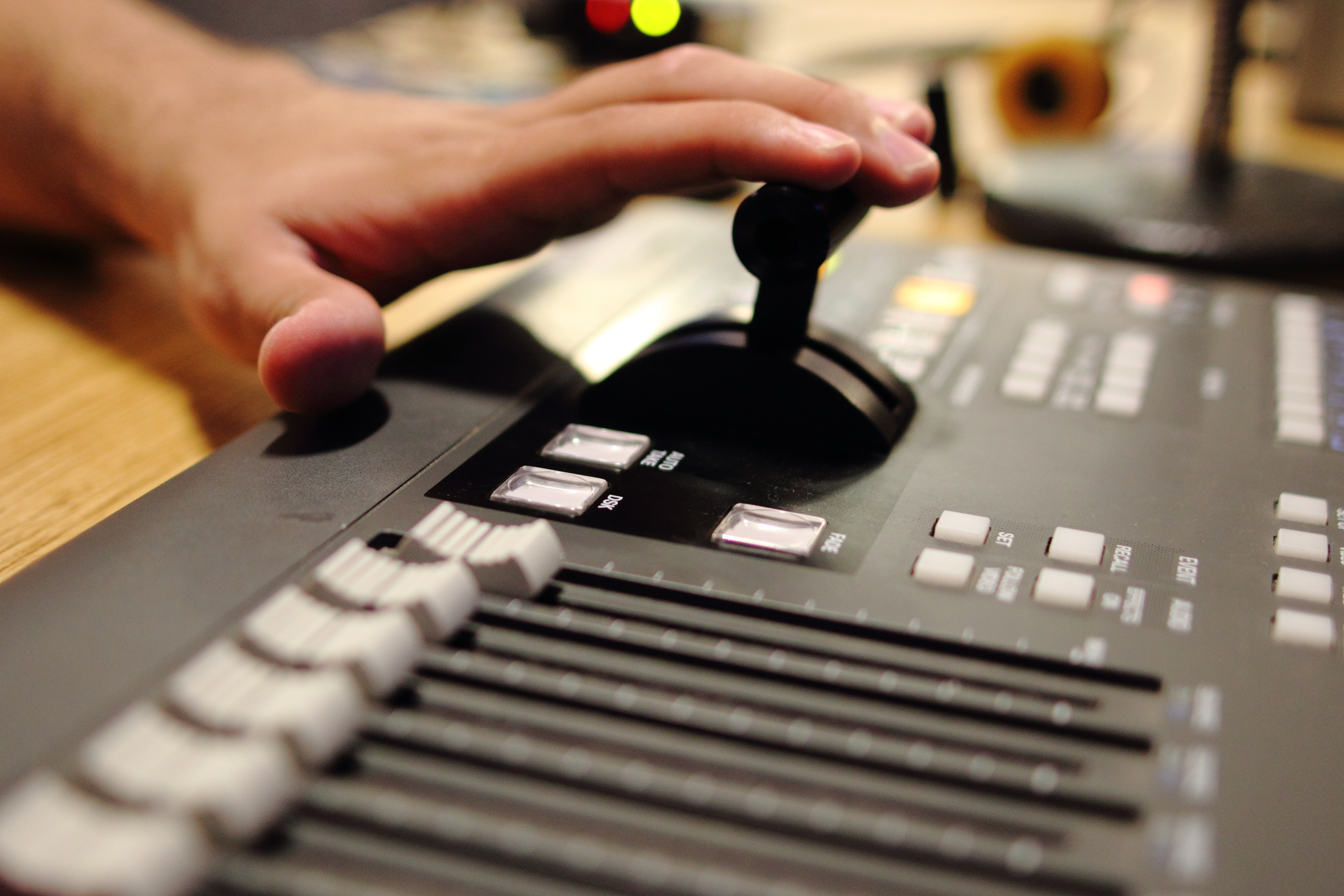
Television Console.

In addition, students have 870 options of exchange in 65 countries, of which 24% are with universities included among the top 500 in the world.

=== ¡Lánzate! Center for Leadership and Challenge ===
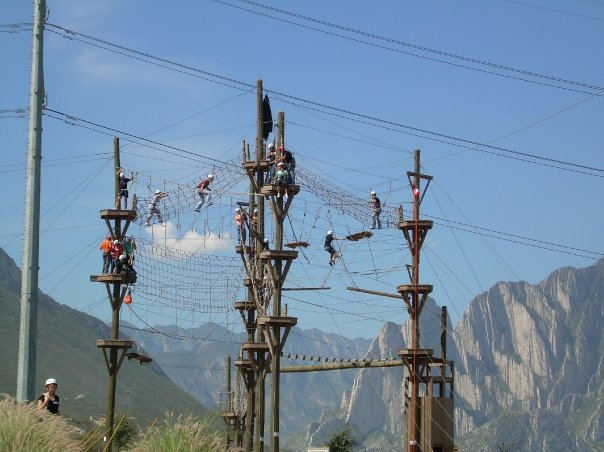
Discovery Course

The center was built according to the standards of ACCT (Association for Challenge Course Technology), which regulates the quality in this type of structures and counts with qualified instructors. The design of the programs was made following the guidelines of the Association for Experiential Education (AEE).

The architectural design of the piece was in charge of Enrique Abaroa, as well as Challenge Towers, globally recognized for creating the "Discovery Course" which offers over 24 different challenges. Only four like this exist in the world, and this is the only in Mexico.

== High School UDEM ==
There are four different units situated in locations across the city.

=== Valle Alto Unit ===
Located in Southern Monterrey, N.L, México, the programs offered at this unit are the International Baccalaureate, the Bicultural Preparatory School Program, and the Multicultural Preparatory School Program.

=== San Pedro Unit ===
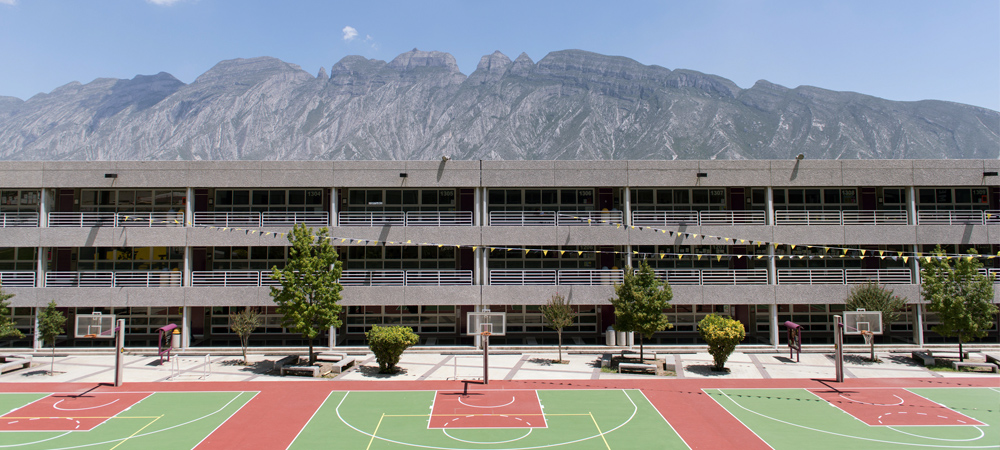
USP

Launched in 1995 and located in the south of the university campus, it offers International Bachelor's degreea (BI) that combine science and humanities. The USP was placed, in the Enlace National Assessment, within the three percent of the best schools in Mexico in 2012 and share the facilities of the professional of the University of Monterrey.

=== Fundadores Unit ===
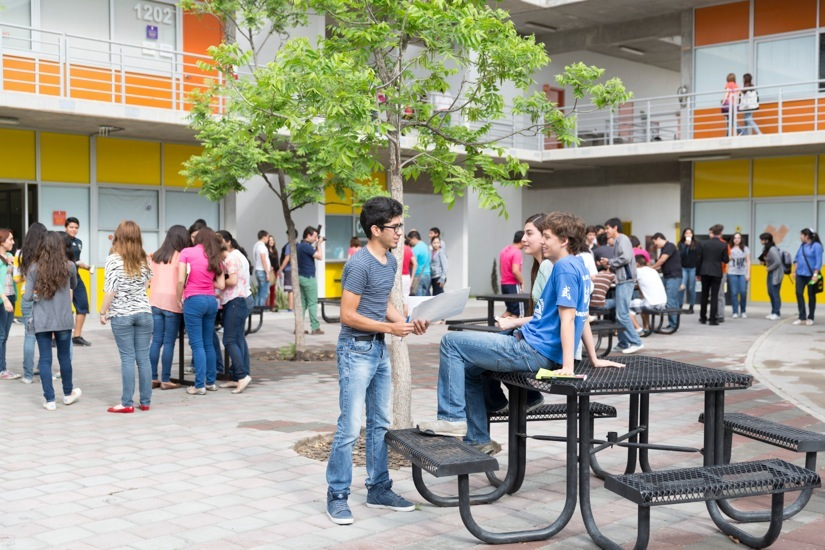
UFU

Located on the limits of San Nicolás and Escobedo, it joined the UDEM family on August 6, 2007, with 62 first-time students.

=== Obispado Unit ===
The Obispado Unit currently has 400 students and is situated in the Obispado Colony.

== Mascot ==
The Trojan is the school mascot. The name was chosen in 1981 and was, originally, just an American football team, which would win the championship in 1984 - 1985 from the National Educational Football Organization.

The university has varsity teams in soccer, futsal, basketball, volleyball, track and field, swimming, Taekwondo, archery and tennis.

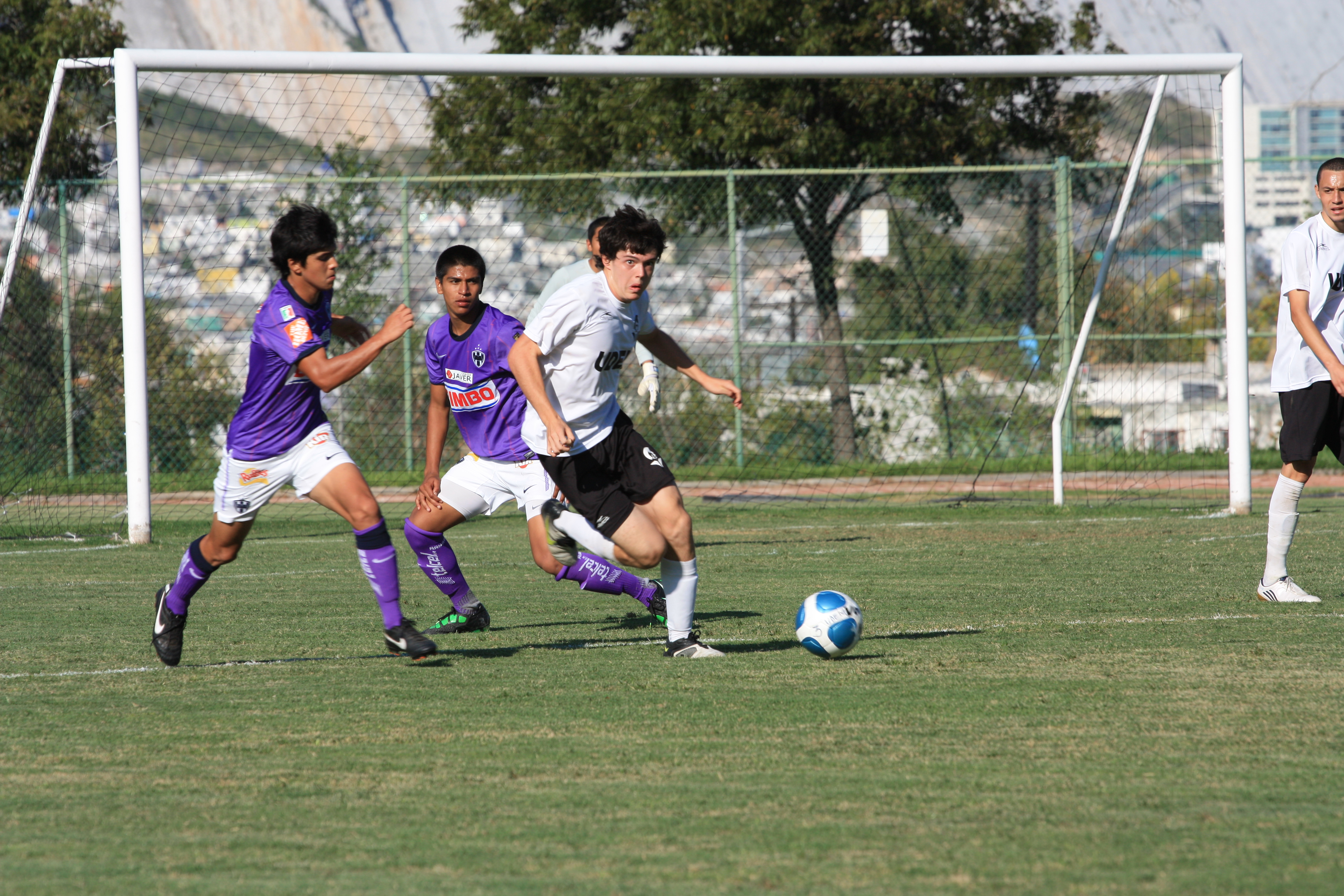
The Troyans

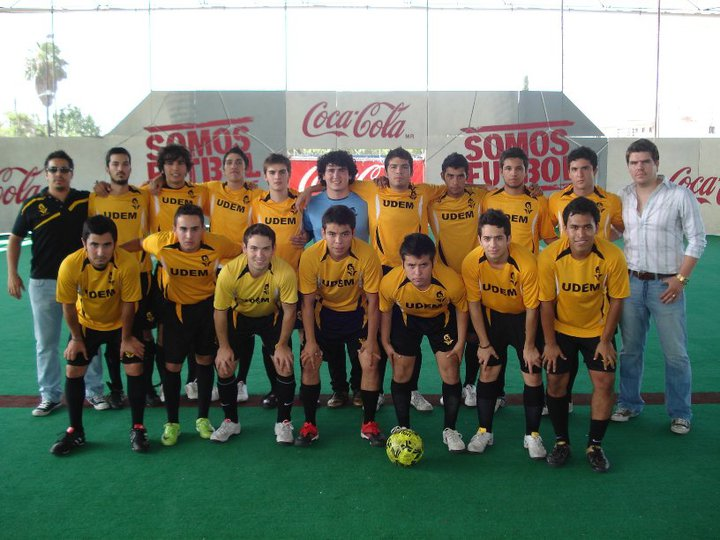
Troyans

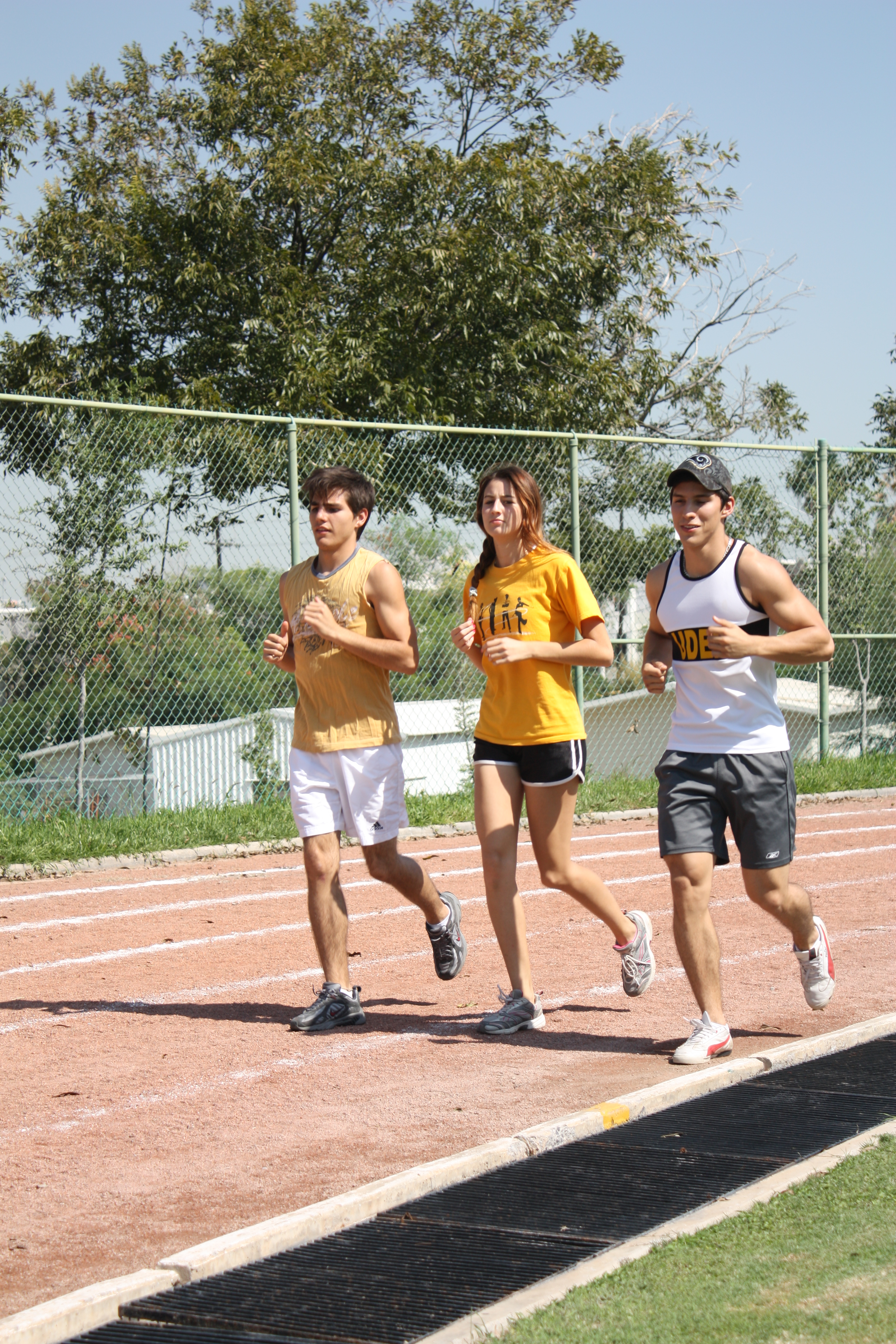
Track and field

== UDEM OpenCourseWare ==
In 2007, through the OpenCourseWare Consortium project, the University of Monterrey offers teachers and students anywhere around the world a collection of free access online courses with content of the graduate programs offered in the university. This way, UDEM hopes to contribute to the overall responsibility of educating and serving the community.

== Accreditation ==
The University of Monterrey has the following accreditations:

- SACS (Southern Association of Colleges and Schools)
- AACSB (Association to Advance Collegiate Schools of Business)
- AMBA (Association of MBAs)
- AMIESIC - Asociación Mexicana de Instituciones de Educación Superior de Inspiración Católica (Mexican Association of Higher Education Institutions with Catholic Inspiration)
- ASINEA - Asociación de Instituciones de Enseñanza de Arquitectura de la República Mexicana (Mexican Association of Architecture Teaching Institutions)
- AMFEM - Asociación Mexicana de Facultades y Escuelas de Medicina (Mexican Association of Medicine Schools)
- CACEI - Consejo de Acreditación de la Enseñanza de la Ingeniería (Engineering Teaching Accreditation Council)
- CONAC - Consejo de Acreditación de la Comunicación (Communication Accreditation Council)
- CNEIP - Consejo Nacional para la Enseñanza e Investigación en Psicología (National Council for Teaching and Research in Psychology)
- College Board
- FIMPES - Federación de Instituciones Mexicanas Particulares de Educación Superior (Federation of Mexican Private Higher Education Institutions)
- IBO - International High School Organization
- ISA - International Schools Association
- Puerto Rico Physician's Court
- ACCECISO - Asociación para la Acreditación y Certificación de Ciencias Sociales (Association for the Certification and Accreditation of Social Sciences)
- CACECA - Consejo de Acreditación en la Enseñanza de la Contaduría y Administración, A.C. (Accounting and Administration Teaching Accreditation Council)
- COMAEM - Consejo Mexicano para la Acreditación de la Educación Médica (Mexican Health Education Accreditation Council)
- CONAC - Consejo de Acreditación de la Comunicación (Communication Accreditation Council)
- CONACE - Consejo Nacional para la Acreditación de la Ciencia Económica (National Council for Accreditation of Economic Science)
