= Fernando González Gortázar =

Mexican architect, sculptor and writer (1942–2022)

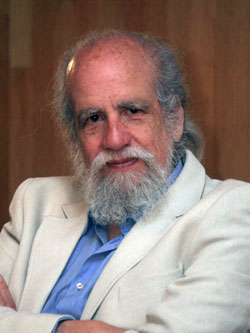
Fernando González Gortázar

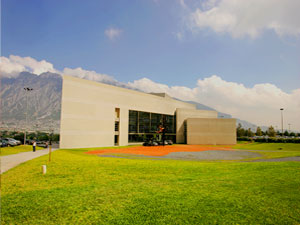
La Serpentina sculpture in front of the Rector's building, the University of Monterrey.

Fernando González Gortázar (19 October 1942 – 7 October 2022) was a Mexican architect, sculptor, and writer, considered to be one of the most influential Mexican architects of the 20th century.

== Life and career ==
Fernando González Gortázar was born in Mexico City on 19 October 1942. He grew up and spent his youth in Guadalajara, Jalisco, but would later return to his birthplace of Mexico City, from 1990. He studied architecture at the University of Guadalajara (Mexico) and received his BA in 1966, presenting as his thesis the project for a National Monument to Independence. As a student, he participated in several sculpture workshops with Professor Olivier Seguin at the School of Fine Arts of the same university.

González Gortázar studied Esthetics with Pierre Francastel at the Superior School of Art and Archeology (now the Institute of Art and Archeology), and the Sociology of Art with Jean Cassou at the Collège de France, both in Paris (1967-1968). An architect, urbanist, landscape artist, scholar of Mexican folklore, he fought for the preservation of the historical-cultural and ecological-natural heritage of Mexico.

Among his most important works, we find The Great Gate (1969), the Fountain of Sister Water (1970), the entrance to González Gallo Park and The Tower of Cubes (both from 1972), the Plaza-Fountain (1973), the González Silva House (1980), the Elf's Walkway (1991), the Maya People's Museum (1993), the Public Safety Center (1993), the Los Altos University Center of the University of Guadalajara (1993, still unfinished), the Chiapas Museum of Science and Technology (2005), and the Emblem of San Pedro (Fátima and the Flags Monument, 2011), and The Three Hairs of the Devil (2014), all in various cities in Mexico, as well as the Fountain of Stairs (Madrid, 1987) and The Escorial Tree (El Escorial, 1995) in Spain, and the Disjointed Column (1989) at the Hakone Open-Air Museum, in Japan.

In 2000, he held the Federico Mariscal Professorship of the Department of Architecture of the National Autonomous University of Mexico (UNAM). In 2009, he hosted Cancioncitas (Little Songs), 26 radio programs on Mexican popular music in the twentieth century, for Radio UNAM, which were later rebroadcast by several stations in Mexico and Colombia.

González Gortázar died on 7 October 2022, at the age of 79.

== Prizes and distinctions ==
Fernando González Gortázar had an honorary doctorate from the University of Guadalajara. He was awarded the National Prize for Arts and Sciences in 2012.

In 2014, a personal exhibition of González Gortázar was held at the Museo de Arte Moderno.

== Realized projects ==
- La Gran Puerta (1969), Guadalajara
- La Columna Dislocada (1989) in the Hakone Open-Air Museum, Hakone, Japan
- Museo del Pueblo Maya (1993), Mérida
- Museo Chiapas de Ciencia y Tecnología (2005), Tuxtla Gutiérrez
- Fuente de las Escaleras (1987), Madrid, Spain

== Books ==
=== Books by Fernando González Gortázar ===
- Ignacio Díaz Morales habla de Luis Barragán (Ignacio Díaz Morales Speaks of Luis Barragán), 1990.
- Mathias Goeritz en Guadalajara (Mathias Goeritz in Guadalajara), 1991.
- La arquitectura mexicana del siglo XX (Mexican Architecture of the 20th Century), 1994, which he coordinated, and for which wrote the introduction and part of the text; republished in 1996 and 2004.
- La fundación de un sueño: la Escuela de Arquitectura de Guadalajara' (The Founding of a Dream: the Guadalajara School of Architecture), 1995.
- Escritos reunidos (Collected Writings), 2004.
- Konstrukciók Struktúrak: a Magyar Épiszetben és Képzomuvészetben (Constructions and Structures: Architecture and Plastic Arts in Hungary), coauthored with Fábián László, 2006.
- Arquitectura: pensamiento y creación (Architecture: Thought and Creation), 2014.
- Las Torres de Ciudad Satélite (The Towers of Ciudad Satélite), 2014.

=== Books about Fernando González Gortázar (monographs) ===
- Fernando González Gortázar by Raquel Tibol, 1977.
- Fernando González Gortázar by Manuel Larrosa, 1998.
- Fernando González Gortázar: Años de Sueños (Fernando González Gortázar, Years of Dreams), texts by Fernando Huici and Teresa del Conde, among others.
- Fernando González Gortázar: sí, aún (Fernando González Gortázar: yes, still) by Carlos Ashida, 2000.
- Fernando González Gortázar: Arquitectura y Escultura 1965-2001(Fernando González Gortázar: Architecture and Sculpture 1965-2001), texts by Fernando Huici and György Kévés, among others, 2001.
- Fernando González Gortázar by Antonio Riggen Martínez, 2005.
- Fernando González Gortázar: Centro Universitario de Los Altos (Fernando González de Gortázar: Los Altos University Center, Jalisco), by Miquel Adriá and Jaime Moreno Villareal, 2006.
- Fernando González Gortázar by Jaime Moreno Villarreal, 2008.
- Fernando González Gortázar: Series Dispersas (Fernando González Gortázar: Scattered Series) by Lelia Driben, 2009.
- Fernando González Gortázar: Resumen del Fuego (Fernando González Gortázar: Summary of Fire), texts by Carlos Mijares Bracho, José Luis Merino and Daniel Garza Usabiaga, among others, 2013.
