= College De La Salle (Frères) =

Coordinates: 31.9659°N 35.9147°E

College De La Salle / La Salle Amman (Freres)
- Al Razi Street, Jabal Al-Hussien, Amman; Jordan

Information
- Type: Independent
- Established: 1950
- Faculty: approx. 120 (2017)
- Enrollment: approx. 1,400 (2017)
- Website: https://www.lasalleamman.com/

College De La Salle Frères is a private Catholic school in Amman, Jordan.

The school was established in 1950 and is sponsored by the Institute of the Brothers of the Christian Schools, also known as the De La Salle Brothers. It is part of a network of such schools operating in 80 countries around the world.

== History ==
The founding of a De la Salle school in Amman came as a response to Nehme Sama'an's personal invitation to open a Lasallian school in the city.

In 1950, Alberto Gori, the Latin Patriarch of Jerusalem, consented to the opening of College De La Salle in Amman. On August 16, permission was granted by the government to open the school under the name "College de la Salle". The school opened its doors for the first time in Jabal Amman, in a rented house near the grounds of the existing school. On September 19, the school opened with 50 pupils registered in three classes, for the coming school year to begin on October 2. By October 14, the school had 118 pupils.

By 1952, the school had grown to 333 pupils, and the small rented house where the school had functioned for the previous two years became too small. On December 2, 1952, a piece of land was bought near the Abdali camp, situated outside of the city limits and without access by road.

On January 20, 1953, the school finalised plans to build the school, but work did not begin on construction until May 12 due to a delay in obtaining the necessary authorizations from the relevant ministries. By October 7, the new building opened its doors, despite the building not yet being finished.

== The school today ==
In 2024, the school offers education from nursery school to secondary school.

The school is open to boys and girls who wish to study for the International Baccalaureate Diploma, IGCSE O-level and GCE A-level, Jordanian certificate of Secondary Education (Tawjihi), and SAT.

In 2017 the school had 1400 pupils with a staff of about 120 teachers.

The principal of the school is Dr. Raeda Sigma. (PhD in Gender Studies)

The school is affiliated with the British Council.
