= St. Anthony's School, Teluk Intan =

St. Anthony's School
- Sekolah St. Anthony
- Teluk Intan,, Perak, Malaysia

Information
- School type: Government aided school, Co-educational National Primary School and National Secondary School
- Motto: Latin: Caritas non ficta (Charity without hypocrisy)
- Denomination: Roman Catholic Church
- Patron saint: St. Anthony of Padua
- Established: 1931
- Founder: Rev. Fr. Michel Bonamy
- School district: Hilir Perak
- Authority: Ministry of Education (Malaysia)
- Principal: Balarama Krishnan (Secondary)
- Headmaster: Mohd Nordin bin Mohd Amin (Primary)
- Grades: Standard 1 - 6 Form 1 - 6
- Gender: Co-educational
- Enrollment: Over 1000
- Campus: Jalan Sekolah (Anderson Road)
- Colours: Green, White and Blue
- Song: School Rally (Alma Mater's Call)
- Yearbook: The Anthonian
- Feeder schools: SK St. Anthony, Teluk Intan
- Affiliations: De La Salle Brothers
- Abbreviation: SAS
- Website: smksaintanthonyti.wixsite.com/website
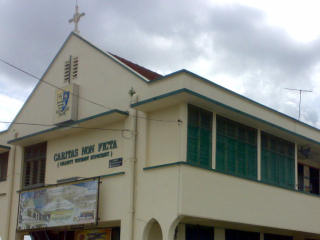
- Chapel block of St. Anthony's School, Teluk Intan

Saint Anthony's School (Malay: Sekolah Saint Anthony; abbreviated SAS) is a school in Teluk Intan, Perak, Malaysia. Established in 1931 as a school belonging to the local Roman Catholic parish of the same name which is in turn under the ecclesiastical purview of the Diocese of Penang, the school was transferred to the De La Salle Brothers after the Second World War and has remained part of the Lasallian community since.

== History ==
On 2 February 1931, the parish priest of St. Anthony's Church; the Rev. Fr. Michel Bonamy; started a school in a wooden shack adjoining the church building to cater to the needs of the Catholic children in his parish. Until then, school going Catholic children attended the nearby Methodist School (today known as the Horley Methodist School). The school was named after St. Anthony of Padua and had an initial enrolment of 11 students.

In March 1936, the Rev. Fr. John Edmond succeeded Fr. Bonamy as the parish priest and Headmaster of the school and successfully acquired a piece of land opposite the church across Anderson Road for the school. The first block of six classrooms was built on this land and officially opened by the British Resident of Perak, Marcus Rex, on 27 January 1941.

During the Japanese occupation of Malaya, the school was eventually closed in 1943 and served as a barracks for soldiers of the local Japanese garrison. The school remained closed until the Surrender of Japan ended the hostilities of the Second World War and Malaya came under the British Military Administration.

=== The first Lasallian Brothers ===
After the War, Fr. Edmond sought to re-open the school but was hampered by a severe shortage of funds and manpower. A visit by the Assistant Superior General of the De La Salle Brothers, Brother Lawrance O'Toole, to Malaya provided Fr. Edmond the opportunity to re-open the school. In a meeting with Bro. Lawrance in Penang, Fr. Edmond suggested that the Lasallian Brothers assume the administration and oversight of the school.

In 1947, the Rev. Bro. Finan Owen, FSC, was welcomed by the Fr. Edmond's successor, the Rev. Fr. Arokianathan, as the first Lasallian Brother Director of St. Anthony's School. He was subsequently succeeded by the Rev. Bro. Mathias Patrick, FSC, (1949–1950) and the Rev. Bro. Sigolin Henry Lassaud, FSC, (1950–1955).

=== Independence of Malaya ===
Following the education reforms of the Razak Report in 1956, mission schools were required to follow to a common national curriculum but were still granted the autonomy of hiring their own teachers through their own Board of Governors. This was facilitated by graduates of the Roman Catholic Church run Bukit Nanas Teachers' College and the St. Joseph Teachers' College in Kuala Lumpur and Penang respectively. In exchange, the government provided funding in the form of grant-in-aid to the mission schools.

The Independence period saw stewardship of the school passed on to the former Director of St. Michael's Institution, the Rev. Bro. Denis Hyland, FSC. During Bro. Denis' stewardship, the school was acknowledged as one of the top English medium schools in the Lower Perak district. Bro. Denis was also instrumental in acquiring a two-acre site adjacent to the school that eventually became the school field.

In 1961, the former Director of St. Patrick's School in Singapore, the Rev. Bro. Alban D'Rozario, FSC, was appointed the Director of the school. During Bro. Alban's stewardship, a three-acre site was acquired in Jalan Sungai Nibong and a new campus was built on that location to house the Primary School.

=== The last Lasallian Brothers ===
Bro. Alban was succeeded by the Rev Bro. Damian Oliver, FSC, as the Director. The Sixth Form Centre was established during Bro. Damian's stewardship and the school emerged as one of Malaysia's more outstanding schools particularly in the sciences and in English language studies. The school hall was also built during this period. The hall was named Dewan Damian (English: Damian Hall) in his honour during the 60th anniversary of the school in 1992. Bro. Damian served until 1 July 1974 when he left to take Directorship of St. George's Institution in Taiping.

It was also in this period that further reforms in the Malaysian education system hastened the end of the Lasallian Brothers direct administration of the school. The Aziz Commission of 1971 provided for special benefits to teachers in mission schools provided they became civil servants. A majority of mission school teachers opted for this effectively ending the autonomy of mission schools in hiring their own teachers. This was preceded by the closure of the two church run Teachers' Colleges after they were deaccredited by the Ministry of Education resulting in the lack of suitable candidates for direct hiring by mission schools.

Bro. Damian was replaced by the Rev. Bro. Kevin Byrne, FSC, who served until 1976 who was in turn replaced by the Rev. Bro. Oliver Rogers, FSC. Bro. Oliver, who served until the following year, was to be the last Lasallian Brother to serve as Director of the school.

=== Current developments ===
Mr. Toh Soon Guan became the first lay Principal of the school and helped shepherd the school through the transition from the English medium to the Malay medium. St. Anthony's School remains a highly regarded institution in Teluk Intan.

== Affiliations ==
St. Anthony's School is affiliated with the other 43 Lasallian educational institutions in Malaysia as well as the larger Lasallian family worldwide. Students, faculty members as well as alumni of the school have been frequent participants in events organised by the Lasallian East Asian District (LEAD).

== Notable alumni ==
- Brigadier General Ng Chin Huat, Defence Adviser of the Permanent Mission of Malaysia to the United Nations
- Rt. Rev. Antony Selvanayagam, Bishop of the Roman Catholic Diocese of Penang
