= De La Salle School, Basildon =

School in Basildon, Essex, England

De La Salle School

Location
- Ghyllgrove; Basildon, Essex, SS14 2LA; England; 51°34′46″N 0°27′59″E

Information
- Type: Voluntary aided comprehensive
- Religious affiliation: Roman Catholic
- Established: 1972
- Local authority: Essex
- Department for Education URN: 115237 Tables
- Ofsted: Reports
- Chair of Governors: Sarah D'Lima
- Headteacher: Paul Norris
- Deputy Headteacher: Anna Brown
- Staff: 65
- Gender: Coeducational
- Age: 11 to 16
- Enrolment: 752
- Capacity: 750
- Website: http://www.dlsbasildon.org/

De La Salle School is a Roman Catholic voluntary aided school located in Basildon, Essex for boys and girls aged 11 to 16, in the Trusteeship of the La Sallian Brothers, and within the Diocese of Brentwood.

== History ==
The school was founded in September 1972 as St Anselm's Roman Catholic Secondary School, the first comprehensive secondary school in the district of Basildon established after the tripartite system was no longer implemented in Essex. Its name was changed to De La Salle School in 1996, after the French priest and educator Jean-Baptiste de la Salle. The school was awarded Language College specialist status in 2008.

== See also ==
- La Sallian educational institutions
