= Collège des Frères (Bab al-Louq) =

Collège-des-Frères (Bab al-Louq)
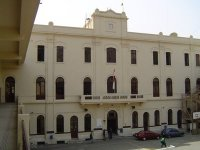
- Collège-des-Frères main building from inside the campus.

Location
- El-Sheikh-Rihan st. (Main gate). Falaki st. (West gate). Mansour st. (East gate); Bab al-Louq, Cairo; Egypt
- Coordinates: 30.042051°N 31.239147°E

Information
- Type: Private
- Religious affiliation: Catholic
- Patron saint: St. Jean-Baptiste de la Salle
- Established: 1888
- School district: Abdeen
- Principal: M. Pierre Carl
- Grades: Kinder Garden, Primary, Preparatory, Secondary
- Gender: Males.
- Enrollment: 800
- Language: French
- Affiliation: Lasallian
- Website: www.freresbabellouk.org.

Collège-des-Frères (lit. 'The Brothers' College', Egyptian Arabic: مدرسة الفرير, باب اللوق, IPA: [mædˈɾæst el feˈɾeːɾ ˈbæːb elˈluːʔ]), also known as Frères Bab el-Louk, is a French school in Bab al-Louq, a neighborhood in downtown Cairo. It is one of six Lasallian educational institutions in Egypt, of which four are located in Cairo and two in Alexandria.

== History ==
On 3 June 1888, two religious brothers, (Les Frères is French for "the brothers") began their mission at St. Joseph School by the Cathedral Church of Saint Joseph of the Franciscan Padres in downtown Cairo. The first class had two students.

- 1900 - on the canonization of Jean-Baptiste de La Salle, the school changed its name to the name of the founder of the Brothers, and it became Jean-Baptiste de La Salle School.
- 1906 - Les Frères bought the property of Mustafa Fahmi, in Bab al-Louq the current site of the school. This is one of the oldest districts of Cairo.
- 1908 - the construction of a new building started.
- 1914 - the first mass was conducted on 25 March.
- 1917 - the number of students reached 300.
- 1918 - school included 10 classes, with two others for the free school St Antoine in the place of the current division of the Nursery school.
- 1922 - the number of students reached 500.
- 1992 - a new building was constructed along Falaky street to receive students of the secondary cycle that made it possible for the students to continue their secondary studies within their own establishment. Computer labs, science labs, and video rooms were built.

== Patron saint ==
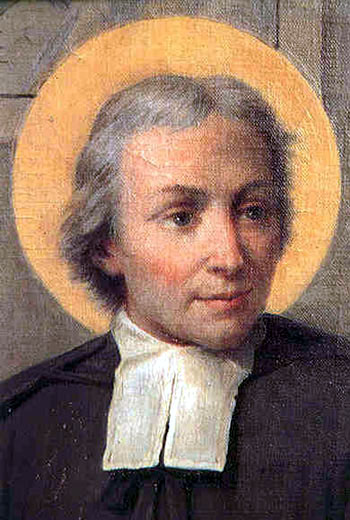
Saint Jean-Baptiste de la Salle

=== Jean-Baptiste de la Salle ===
Jean-Baptiste de La Salle was born in Rheims, France on 30 April 1651. He was 29 years old when he realized that the educational system of his day was inadequate to meet the needs of the poor children of seventeenth-century France. To provide a Christian and human education, De La Salle founded a religious community of men, the Brothers of the Christian Schools (Fratres Scholarum Christianarum), dedicated to the instruction of youth, especially the poor. De La Salle died on Good Friday, 7 April 1719. Pope Pius XII canonized him a saint of the Catholic Church in 1900, and he was declared the "Universal Patron of All Teachers" in 1950. The feast of Jean-Baptiste de La Salle is celebrated on 15 May by the De La Salle Brothers worldwide.

== See also ==
- Category:Collège des Frères (Bab al-Louq) alumni
- Lasallian educational institutions
- Collège Saint Marc, Alexandria
- Education in Egypt
