= St. Andrew's Secondary School (Muar, Johor) =

SMK St. Andrew, Muar
- Sekolah Menengah Kebangsaan St. Andrew
- SMK St. Andrew ; SAS

Location
- Muar, Johor; Malaysia
- 2.050257°N 102.577519°E

Information
- Type: National Secondary School (Government-aided)
- Motto: "Suaviter In Modo, Fortiter In Re" (Latin: Gentle in manner, resolute in deed)
- Religious affiliation: Catholicism (De La Salle Brothers)
- Established: 1930
- Colors: Green, White
- Website: https://lasallecentre.wixsite.com/lasallecentre/st-andrews-school-secondary

SMK St. Andrew (also known as St. Andrew's Secondary School; abbreviation: SAS) is a government-aided all-boys national secondary school located in Muar, Johor, Malaysia. Founded by the De La Salle Brothers, it is one of the oldest mission schools in Muar and is part of the La Sallian school network in Malaysia.

== History ==
=== Early Years (1930–1948) ===
- 1930: Founded by Mr. K. Kathiravelu at Jalan Arab, Muar, originally named "Muar Town School."
- 1933: Taken over by Rev. Fr. J.P. Francois and renamed St. Andrew's School.
- 1949: Under the recommendation of the Bishop of Malacca, the De La Salle Brothers officially assumed administrative control, integrating it into the global La Sallian educational system.

=== The Era of Rev. Bro. Robert (1954–1980) ===
From 1954 to 1980, the school was led by Rev. Bro. Robert O'Sullivan. During his 26-year tenure, the school achieved significant success in academics, discipline, and sports (particularly hockey), becoming recognized as a top elite school in Muar and Johor. Bro. Robert was well-known for his strict approach to discipline.

=== Modern Transition ===
Following changes in the Malaysian Education Act, the school transitioned into a National Secondary School (SMK). While maintaining its mission school traditions, it continues to emphasize a trilingual education system in accordance with the Ministry of Education's curriculum.

== Academic and Curriculum ==
=== Dual Language Programme (DLP) ===
SMK St. Andrew is an authorized school for the Dual Language Programme (DLP). Under this initiative, Science and Mathematics are taught entirely in English. This aims to align with international academic standards and enhance students' competitiveness in higher education.

=== Trilingual Policy ===
As a national-type school, SAS emphasizes the development of Malay (national language), English, and Chinese (mother tongue). The school maintains a strong English-speaking environment while encouraging participation in Chinese cultural and literary activities.

== School Culture ==
=== Motto ===
"Suaviter In Modo, Fortiter In Re"
This Latin phrase translates to "Gentle in manner, resolute in deed." It reflects the school's expectation for students to be courteous in their interactions while remaining firm and determined in their actions.

=== Emblem and Colors ===
- Colors: Green (symbolizing life and hope) and White (symbolizing purity).
- Andreans: This is the term used by students and alumni to refer to themselves, representing a strong sense of belonging and brotherhood.

== Extra-curricular Activities ==
=== Sporting Tradition ===
The school has a distinguished sporting history. It is a powerhouse for hockey in the Muar district and has consistently produced athletes for the Johor state and Malaysian national teams. The school is also active in athletics and football.

=== Student Organizations ===
The school hosts various uniformed bodies and clubs, including the Malaysian Red Crescent Society, Scouts Association of Malaysia, Chinese Language Society, and Science Society.

== Infrastructure ==
Located at Jalan Hashim, Muar, the school's main facilities include:

- Administration Block: Housing the Principal’s office and staff rooms.
- School Hall: Used for assemblies and cultural events.
- Modern Laboratories: Equipped for Science practicals under the DLP.
- Library and Multimedia Rooms.

== Notable alumni ==
SMK St. Andrew has produced numerous leaders in politics, business, medicine, and academia. The active Muar Andreans Association (MAA) plays a vital role in supporting the school, providing scholarships, and offering career guidance.
