= Bab al-Louq =

Neighborhood in downtown Cairo, Egypt

Coordinates: 30°03′00″N 31°14′00″E

Bab al-Louq (also Bab el-Louk, Bab al-Luq; Egyptian Arabic: باب اللوق, IPA: [bæːb elˈluːʔ]) is a neighborhood in downtown Cairo. The Egyptian Ministry of Interior was formerly located there. Bab al-Louq square is the oldest square in Cairo, dating back to the Mamluk era.
