= Colegio Nuestra Señora de las Maravillas =

Private school in Madrid

Coordinates: 40°26′48″N 3°41′14″W

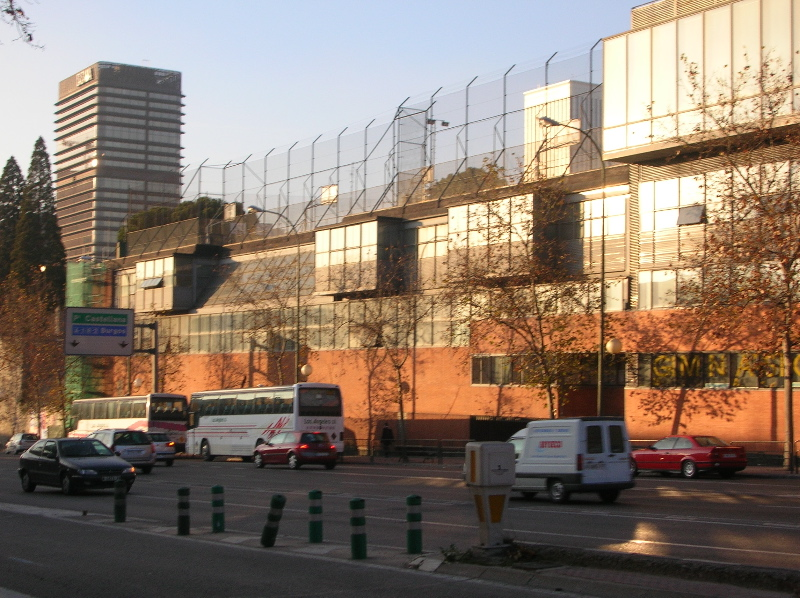
Fachada posterior del Colegio Nuestra Señora de las Maravillas - La Salle, y del Gimnasio.

Colegio Nuestra Señora de las Maravillas (English:Our Lady of Wonders) is a private Catholic school in Madrid, Spain, belonging to the order of La Salle founded in 1892 by Brother Justinus Marie, belonging to the Brothers of the Christian Schools of La Salle. The current director is Juanjo Cerrajero Amat about 2,000 students, compared with 10 who had the opening day.

== History ==
The school's first location was at Bravo Murillo Street, in the neighborhood of Cuatro Caminos (now his place is the Mercado de Maravillas). On May 11, 1931, the school along with its attached school, School of San Jose, perished in the fire. The plot is inherited from the Novitiate created by the "Brothers of the Christian Schools" in 1889, and takes its name from an old paper mill that was there. At 3 years, the novitiate was moved to Burgos, adopting both the school grounds and the building, as the name.

The school was reopened in 1933 at a house located at 54 Paseo de la Castellana with the name "College-Academy Menendez Pelayo" in an atmosphere of secrecy due to the political situation in the country, to that July 20 of 1936 when they dispersed again. After the end of the Spanish Civil War in 1939, the school opened for the third time regaining its original name for the post of 14 Christian Brothers led by Felipe Hilario. The school moved in 1943 due to a larger number of students. The school acquired nearly 9,000 sq meters of space in 1941 in the Colony Viso.

The school was inaugurated on May 15, 1939, coinciding with the feast of Jean-Baptiste de La Salle.

The figure of Mary Immaculate (image reproduction on one of the columns of Piazza di Spagna, Rome) located on the exterior facade of the Church of the school, aimed at Calle Joaquin Costa, who is the original figure, has existed since the first location of the college, and was all that was saved from a fire of 1931. It was blessed in 1892 by the SS Nuncio, Monsignor Angelo di Pietro.

== Gymnasium ==
In 1962, the gymnasium was inaugurated, considered today as one of the greatest architectural constructions of Madrid, and is being studied by architecture students. was designed and built by the architect Alejandro de la Sota required to bridge a gap of 12 meters between the Guadalquivir and Joaquín Costa streets.

== Directors ==
- (France) Justinus Marie (funder 1892)
- (France) Lucidas Joseph (1893–98)
- (France) Justinien Martyr (1898–99)
- (France) Jovinien Pierre (1899–04)
- (Spain) Hipólito (1904–23)
- (Spain) Regimberto (1923–29)
- (Spain) Hilario Felipe (1929–45)
- (Spain) Felipe Urbano (1945–46) 1º Directorado
- (Spain) Pelayo María (1946–49)
- (Spain) Teodosio Luis (1949–55)
- (Spain) Felipe Urbano (1945–46) 2º Directorado
- (Spain) Domingo Ruiz (1957–63)
- (Spain) Ricardo Álvarez (1963–66)
- (Spain) Evaglio Sánchez (1966–67)
- (Spain) Luis Álvarez (1967–72)
- (Spain) Inocencio Barbero (1972–81)
- (Spain) Esteban Hernáez (1981–89)
- (Spain) Alejandro Pérez–Ochoa (1989–04)
- (Spain) Teodomiro Rodríguez (2004–12)
- (Spain) Juan Alberto Pérez (2004–16)
- (Spain) Juanjo Cerrajero Amat (2016–Act.)

== Media appearances ==
The school has appeared in countless news releases, and news highlighting their anniversary. In addition, various school facilities have been on numerous occasions and unique scenarios of large media events:

- The Church was the setting for the television series "¡Ay, Señor, Señor!" starring Andrés Pajares, and a young Javier Cámara and Neus Asensi . (1994–95).
- The Gym, in addition to appearing in numerous publications for its architectural significance and prominence, was the court where the Real Madrid Basketball played their home games during the building of the Real Madrid Sports City and his Raimundo Saporta Pavilion. He has also been the scene of numerous television commercials.
- The Playground, hosted the announcement of the San Miguel Beer starring the brothers Pau Gasol and Marc Gasol. (2011).

== Humanitarian work ==
The school has worked with the '"Building NGO Community of Nazareth"' since 1987. This initiative came together by Alumni and Parents.
