= Instituto Regiomontano =

School in Monterrey, Mexico

Coordinates: 25.7255°N 100.4073°W

Instituto Regiomontano AC

Location
- Monterrey, Nuevo Leon; Mexico

Information
- Type: Private
- Motto: Esto Vir (Latin: Being a Man)
- Established: 1942
- Principal: Alejandro Romero Frausto
- Campus: ChepeVera, Cumbres, Santa Catarina
- Color(s): Blue, Red, White
- Mascot: Lion
- Nickname: Regio
- Affiliations: Catholic, Lasallian
- Website: http://www.ir.edu.mx

Instituto Regiomontano is a private institution serving students from Pre-School through High School in Monterrey, Nuevo Leon. It is part of the Institute of the Brothers of the Christian Schools. It has two campuses: Chepe Vera and Cumbres. The actual principal of the school is Alejandro Romero Frausto. In September 2022 the school turned 80.
