= Quartier Necker =

Coordinates: 48.8398756°N 2.3189805°E

Necker
- Quartier Necker
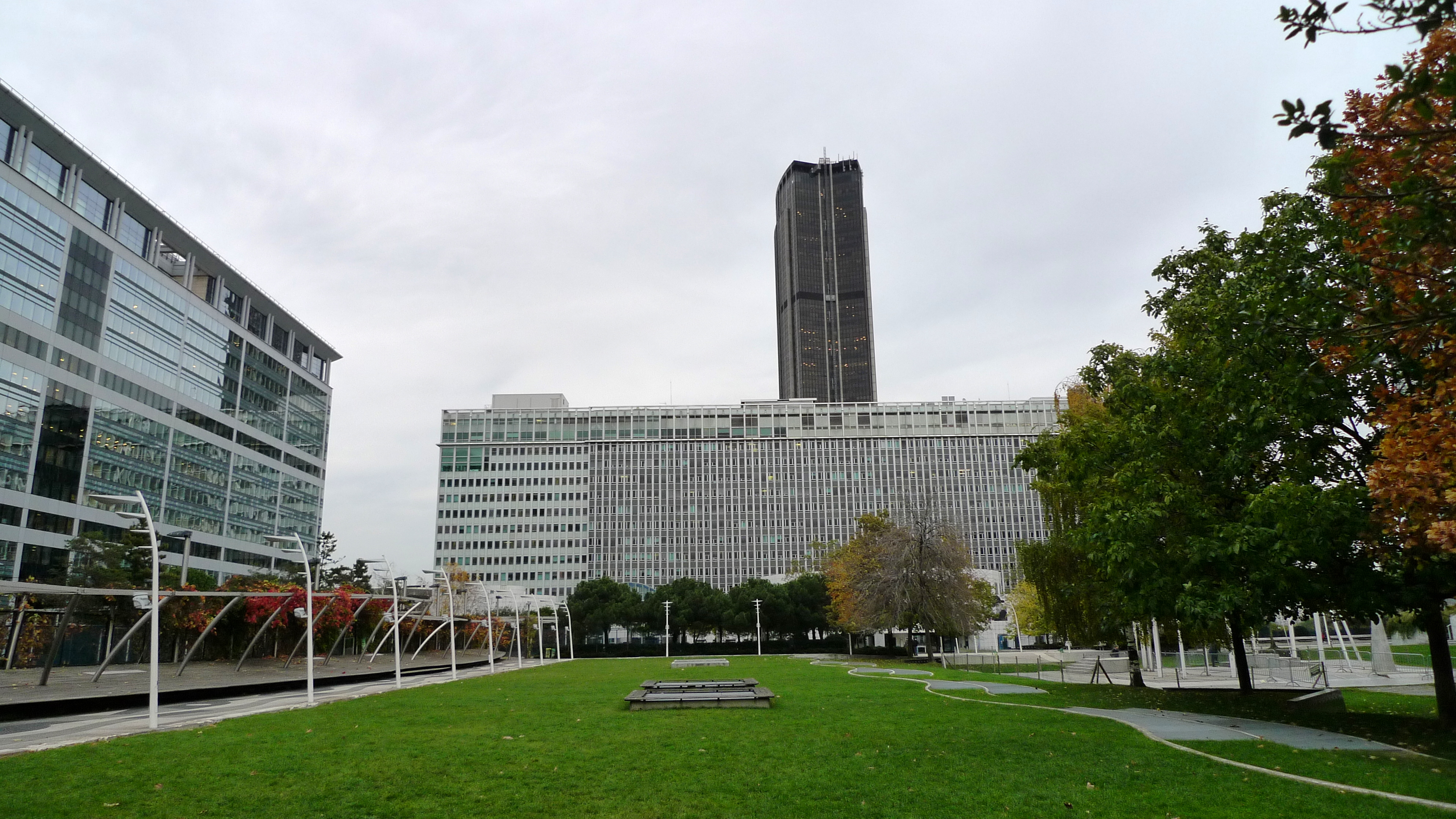
- Jardin Atlantique
- Interactive map of Necker
- Country: France
- Region: Île-de-France
- Ville: Paris
- Arrondissement: 15th

Area
  - Total: 1.578 km^{2} (0.609 sq mi)

Population (2016)
  - Total: 47,393
  - Density: 30,034/km^{2} (77,790/sq mi)

The Quartier Necker is the 58th quarter of Paris located in the 15th arrondissement.

== Location ==
The Quarters of the 15th arrondissement

Located in the east of the district, the Quartier Necker corresponds to the initially uninhabited space between Paris and the former commune of Vaugirard. Extending over 157 hectares, it is delimited to the north by the boulevard du Montparnasse, a portion of the rue de Sèvres and the avenue de Saxe, then the avenue de Suffren, to the west by the rue de la Croix-Nivert, to the south by the rue Mademoiselle, the rue Cambronne and the rue de la Procession, and to the east by part of the lines of the Gare Montparnasse (the easternmost tracks in fact belong to the 14th arrondissement), and the rue du Départ.

== Specific sites ==
The train station and the Tour Montparnasse are certainly the most famous landmarks in the area. Around the station, the neighborhood has been renovated and now features tall residential and office buildings, a park (the Jardin Atlantique) built on a vast platform above the railway tracks, and shopping centers. Finally, the Necker district is home to numerous public buildings, including the Lycée Buffon, the Necker–Enfants Malades Hospital, and the Pasteur Institute.

== Museums ==
- The Musée de La Poste ;
- The Musée Bourdelle ;
- The Musée du Général Leclerc de Hauteclocque et de la Libération de Paris – Musée Jean Moulin ;
- The Musée Pasteur.

== Places of worship ==
=== Catholic worship ===
- Saint Bernard of Montparnasse Chapel;
- Church of Saint John the Baptiste of La Salle.

=== Orthodox worship ===
- Saint Seraphim of Sarov Church;
- Our Lady of Tenderness Cathedral Chapel.
