= De La Salle Catholic University Manado =

Private university in Manado, Indonesia

Catholic University of De La Salle Manado
- Universitas Katolik De La Salle Manado
- Motto: Religio, Mores, Cultura (Latin)
- Motto in English: Religion, Morals, Culture
- Type: Private Catholic higher education institution
- Established: 2000; 26 years ago
- Founders: Msgr.Joseph Suwatan, MSC; Br. Armin Luistro, FSC
- Religious affiliation: Roman Catholic (Christian Brothers)
- Academic affiliations: APTIK (Association of Indonesian Catholic University); ASEACU; APTISI (Association of Private Higher Education of North Sulawesi province); LASSSAI (Lasallian Schools Supervision Services Association, Inc.); IALU (International Association of La Salle University)
- President: Fr. Benny Salombre, Pr.
- Rector: Prof.Dr. Johanis Ohoitimur
- Administrative staff: More than 100
- Students: Kairagi I Kombos Manado North Sulawesi Indonesia
- Undergraduates: 1,900 Students
- Location: Kairagi I-Kombos, Manado, North Sulawesi, Indonesia; 1.505056°N 124.872778°E
- Campus: Urban Kombos Manado 15 ha (150,000 m^{2})
- Colors: Green and Yellow
- Website: unikadelasalle.ac.id

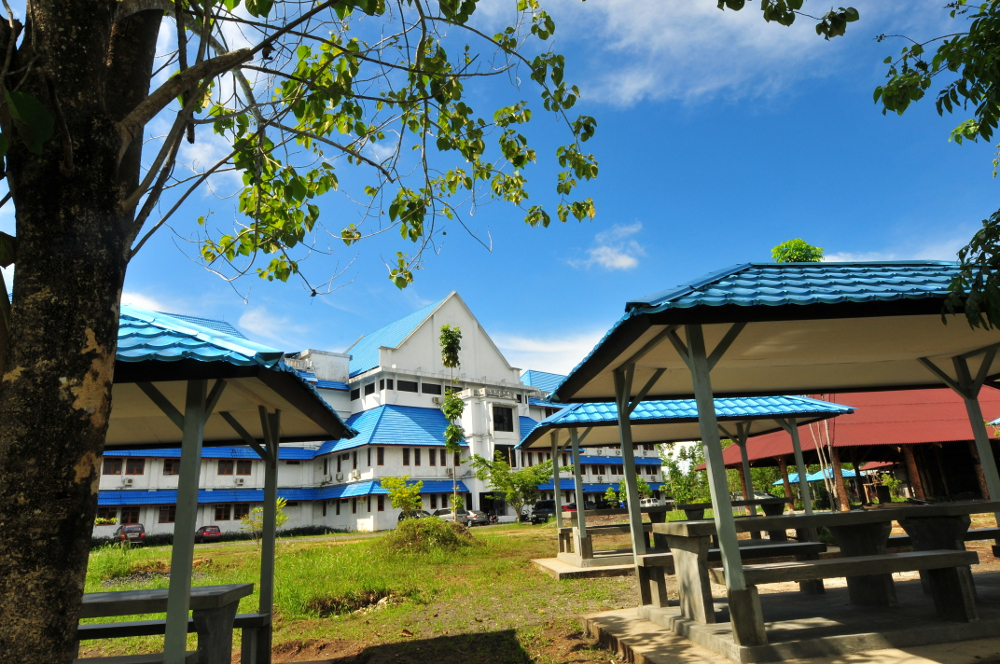
Back view of De La Salle

De La Salle Catholic University Manado (Indonesian: Universitas Katolik De La Salle Manado), is a private Catholic higher education institution run by the Institute of the Brothers of the Christian Schools in Manado, North Sulawesi, Indonesia. it was established by the Christian Brothers in 2000 as a response to the monetary crisis that hit Indonesia in 1997. The Bishop of Manado, Msgr Joseph Suwatan, realized that the crisis hitting Indonesia could be overcome through the establishment of educational institutions. He founded the De La Salle Catholic University Manado in cooperation with the Christian Brothers from the De La Salle University of Manila, Philippines. It is part of the worldwide network of La Sallian educational institutions.

== History ==
The Diocese of Manado, Indonesia runs a series of widespread Catholic educational institutions enrolling children from kindergarten to high school. As well as professionals who have contributed to community development in Indonesia. The contribution of Catholic educational institutions in the general level of Indonesian colleges and high schools, as well as its role in reaching its goals of intellectual development despite poor and diminished government support

As a first attempt to introduce Catholic-run universities in Manado, the Diocese founded in the 1960s IKIP Catholic Budi Dharma which managed to produce graduates (S1) but was later closed. Steps to re-establish Catholic universities began were again begun by the Diocese in 1997, starting with contacts with the De La Salle Brothers in Manila who have years of experience in managing higher education institutions in the Philippines.

=== Catholic university ===
On 7 August 1999, Mgr. J. Suwatan, MSC established the Foundation of Unika De La Salle Manado, with an official letter from Notary R. H. Hardaseputra, SH No. 2 dated 7 August 1999, followed by the Decision Letter of Minister of Education Nr. 123/D/O/2000 (7 August). Father Agus Mangundap, MA was appointed chairman of the foundation. He and other trustee agencies managed the documents and files to be submitted to the Office of Ministry of Education and Culture in Jakarta. In addition, they also coordinated with the provincial of De La Salle Brothers to establish the university, until a memorandum of understanding (MOU) was signed with the provincial of De La Salle Brothers Philippines. Based on the MOU, the Foundation of De La Salle Manado was established by Bishop of Manado Mgr. Josef Suwatan, MSC and Provincial of La Salle Brothers Philippines Brother Armin Luistro, FSC.

After a permit from the Indonesian Government and a lot of improvements, the number of prospective college students of Unika De La Salle Manado drastically increased, a trend that has been continuing until now. In 2009, Father Revi R. H. M. Tanod, SS, SE, MA was appointed Rector for the term of 2009-2013 after passing the selection mechanism.

=== De La Salle Brothers ===
The university is named after Saint John Baptist De La Salle, who was the founder of the religious congregation of the Lasallian Brothers formally known as the Brothers of the Christian School (Fratres Scholarum Christianarum, abbreviated FSC). This religious congregation, founded in Rheims, France in 1680 is exclusively dedicated to education.

=== Recent years ===
Comprehensive and sustainable reformation inside the university have resulted in an increase of confidence from stakeholders, as well as an increasing number of prospective students and the good reputation of its first alumni on the job market. Following the rapid growth of the university, the facilities were moved during the school year 2002-2003 from the original Kanaka campus to a new and much larger campus in Kombos, about three km (1.9 mi) from the center of Manado.

Kombos's 15-hectare (37-acre) campus stands around a four-level building (91 x 18 meters) composed of classrooms and administration facilities. The increasing number and diversity of origin of the university's students reflect the rapid development of Unika De La Salle-Manado. In 2007, from 1,077 active students of Unika De La Salle Manado, approximately 20% came from outside the region such as Pontianak, Balikpapan, Samarinda, Jogjakarta, Jakarta, Papua, Ambon and Ternate.

In 2009, only a decade after its foundation, the number of students in the university reached 1,183 distributed among the five faculties (Engineering, Nursing, Agriculture, Economics, and Law). This year saw the Faculty of Mathematics and Natural Sciences (MIPA) merging with the Faculty of Engineering. Likewise, human resources along with infrastructure and facilities constantly improved both qualitatively and quantitatively. Each year, about 150-200 students graduate from the university.

== Academics ==
=== Faculties ===
The structure of Unika De La Salle is organized into seven faculties as follows:

- Engineering Faculty (Electrical, Informatics, Industrial, and Civil)
- Economics (Management and Accounting)
- Nursing
- Law
- Agribusiness
- Hospitality and Tourism
- Education

Academic programs at the university are evaluated and accredited by the National Accreditation Board for Higher Education (BAN-PT) of Indonesia.

=== Supporting units ===
The university includes the following support units/services:

- the English Department
- the IT Center
- Research and Community Service
- Cooperation and Development
- the Natural Science Laboratory
- the Library
- the Language Lab

== Motto ==
The motto of Unika De La Salle Manado is 'Religio, Mores, Cultura' (Religion, Morals, Culture), reflecting the university's vocation to educate young people to believe in and rely on God, endorse and promote moral values, while respecting, exploring and promoting the world's present and past culture.

== International and national cooperation ==
While continuously improving the training and recruitment of its Indonesian lecturers, Unika De La Salle Manado also develops links with national and international institutions, both academic and non-academic. Cooperation with the Lasallian Schools Supervision Services Association, Inc. (LASSSAI) was formalized with the signing of a memorandum of agreement with the diocese in 2009.

Intense and long-term cooperation has been developed between Unika De La Salle-Manado with the Asia Pacific Regional Conference (PARC) of the Lasallian Brothers, based in Singapore. The latter, through an agreement with the international cooperation NGO Fidesco (Paris, France) regularly sends dedicated lecturers.

At the national level, Unika De La Salle Manado is an active member of the Association of Indonesian Catholic University (APTIK) and the Association of Private Higher Education (APTISI) of North Sulawesi province. Unika De La Salle Manado established cooperation agreements with the Institut Teknologi Bandung, Manado State University, University of Sam Ratulangi, and the University of Merdeka Malang (Unmer). In addition, cooperation agreements for the benefit of professional education has been established with several private hospitals in the national and local levels.

== Community engagement ==
In accordance with the Indonesian higher education mandate of Tri Dharma Perguruan Tinggi (Three Pillars of Higher Education), the university operates an Institute for Research and Community Service (LPPM) to coordinate local community service initiatives.

== Campus ==
At its beginning, Unika De La Salle-Manado occupied a small campus in the center of Manado, Kanaka. It lasted until September 2002. In October 2002, Unika De La Salle-Manado moved to the new campus occupying an area of 15,000 m^{2} (160,000 sq ft) on the highland of Kombos. It is about 3 km (1.9 mi) northeast of the old campus. The new campus is behind Wenang Permai II Residents Complex, Kairagi I. It was officially opened by the Bishop of Manado, Mgr. Josef Suwatan, and the Governor of North Sulawesi, Drs. A. J. Sondakh, on November 30, 2002.

The campus includes a chapel, a central library, and laboratories. Extracurricular activities are organized through Student Activity Units (Indonesian: Unit Kegiatan Mahasiswa, UKM).
