= List of Lasallian saints and beatified people =

The following list includes saints of the Catholic Church and those officially beatified by the Church (beati) who belonged to the De La Salle Brothers.

== Saints ==
- Jean-Baptiste de La Salle (30 April 1651 – 7 April 1719), founder of the Institute, canonized on 24 May 1900
- Solomon Leclercq (15 November 1745 – 2 September 1792), Martyr of the French Revolution, canonized on 16 October 2016
- Bénilde Romançon (14 June 1805 – 13 August 1862), schoolteacher, canonized on 29 October 1967
- Miguel Febres Cordero (7 November 1854 – 9 February 1910), Ecuadorian Brother, canonized on 21 October 1984
- Mutien-Marie Wiaux (20 March 1841 – 30 January 1917), Belgian teacher, canonized on 10 December 1989
- Cirilo Bertrán Sanz Tejedor and 7 Companions (died 9 October 1934), Martyrs of the Spanish Civil War, canonized on 21 November 1999
- Jaime Hilario Barbal (2 January 1898 – 18 January 1937), Martyr of the Spanish Civil War, canonized on 21 November 1999

== Blesseds ==
- Jean (Leon) Mopinot (12 December 1724 – 21 May 1794), Martyr of the French Revolution, beatified on 1 October 1995
- Jean Baptiste (Udalric) Guillaume (1 February 1755 – 27 August 1794), Martyr of the French Revolution, beatified on 1 October 1995
- Pierre-Sulpice-Christophe (Roger) Faverge (25 July 1745 – 12 September 1794), Martyr of the French Revolution, beatified on 1 October 1995
- Julian-Nicolas Rèche (2 September 1838 – 23 October 1890), educator, beatified on 1 November 1987
- Jean-Bernard Rousseau (22 March 1797 – 13 April 1867), "Catechist of Slaves", beatified on 2 May 1989
- Raphaël Rafiringa (3 November 1856 – 19 May 1919), Malagasy Brother, beatified on 7 June 2009
- Edmigio Isidoro Primo Rodriguez and 6 Companions (died between August to September 1936), Martyrs of the Spanish Civil War, beatified on 10 October 1993
- Honorato Andrés Zarraquino Herrero and 4 Companions (died between October to November 1936), Martyrs of the Spanish Civil War, beatified on 11 March 2001
- Ovidio Bertrán Anuncibay Letona and 57 Companions (died between July 1936 to March 1937), Martyrs of the Spanish Civil War, beatified on 28 October 2007
- Agustín María García Tribaldos and 73 Companions (died between July 1936 to July 1938), Martyrs of the Spanish Civil War, beatified on 13 October 2013
- James Alfred Miller (21 September 1944 – 13 February 1982), missionary to Guatemala and martyr, beatified on 7 December 2019

== Venerables ==
- Chretien (Alpert) Motsch (26 May 1849 – 6 April 1898). professed religious, declared Venerable on 12 January 1996
- Adrien-Félix-Jean (Exupérien) Mas (7 June 1829 – 31 January 1905), professed religious, declared Venerable on 3 March 1990
- Adolphe (Théophanius-Léo) Châtillon (31 October 1871 – 28 April 1929), Canadian professed religious, declared Venerable on 2 April 2011
- Giovanni (Teodoreto) Garberoglio (9 February 1871 – 13 May 1954), professed religious and founder of the Union of Catechists of Jesus Crucified and Mary Immaculate, declared Venerable on 3 March 1990
- Augustin Arnaud (Victorin Nymphas) Pagès (7 September 1885 – 16 April 1966), professed religious, declared Venerable on 6 April 2019
- Francisco Andrés (Andrés Hibernón) Garmendía Mendizabál (3 September 1880 – 11 March 1969), professed religious, declared Venerable on 3 July 2008
- Wendelin (Gregorio Cesario) Bühl (13 September 1896 – 11 December 1973), professed religious, declared Venerable on 6 April 1995
- Leonardo (Adolfo) Lanzuela Martínez (8 November 1894 – 14 March 1976), professed religious, declared Venerable on 17 December 2015
- Jean Prosper Fromental Cayroche (27 June 1895 – 5 December 1978), professed religious and founder of the Guadalupan Sisters of de La Salle, declared Venerable on 5 July 2013

== Servants of God ==
- Ghislain-Florent (Térence) Pronier (29 February 1757 – 6 July 1794), Martyr of the French Revolution
- Antonio (Louis) Camilleri (1 September 1923 – 29 May 2011), Maltese professed religious
