= Nicolas Roland =

French priest (1642–1678)

Blessed Nicolas Roland
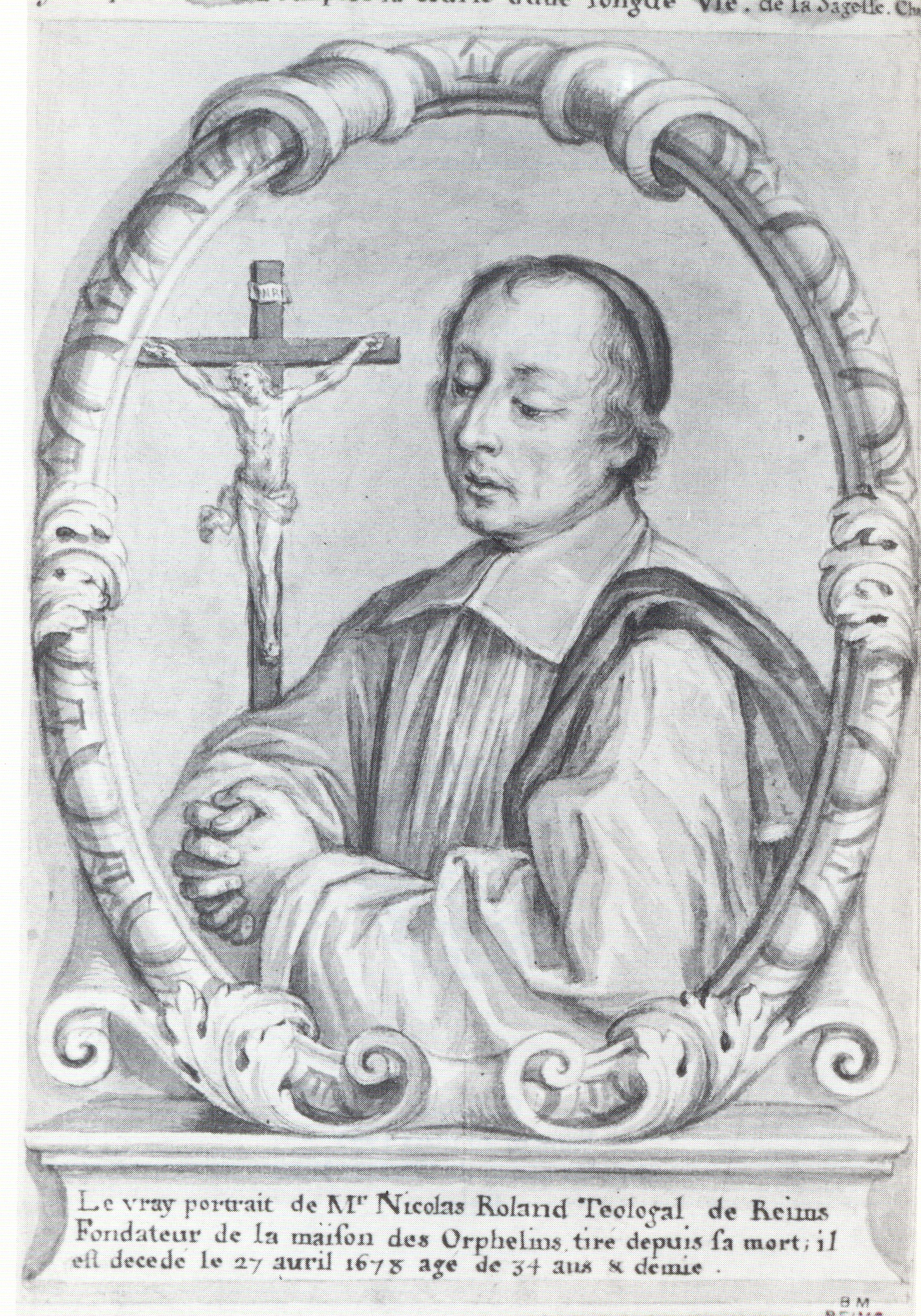
- Official Portrait of Nicolas Roland, from the Livre du Choeur Hannesse, 1888
- Born: 8 December 1642; Baslieux-les-Reims, Champagne, Kingdom of France
- Died: 27 April 1678; Reims, Champagne, Kingdom of France
- Venerated in: Roman Catholic Church (Diocese of Reims and Sisters of the Holy Child Jesus)
- Beatified: 16 October 1994 by Pope John Paul II
- Major shrine: Cathedral of Reims, Reims, Marne, France
- Feast: 27 April

Nicolas Roland (8 December 1642 - 27 April 1678) was a French priest, canon and educator. He was a friend, contemporary and spiritual director of John Baptist de La Salle.

== Biography ==
=== Childhood and early years ===
Nicolas Roland was born in the small town of Baslieux-les-Reims in the ancient province of Champagne, 9 kilometers away from Reims, son of Jean-Baptist Roland (1611–1673), Commissioner for wars and old cloth merchant. His godfather, 23 July 1643, was his uncle, Matthieu Beuvelet.

In 1650 he joined the Jesuit College at Reims, by the church of St. Maurice, where he showed an active intelligence and the wish to become a priest. In 1653 he obtained the tonsure from the bishop Pouy at the abbey of Saint Pierre les Dames. Completing his preliminary studies, he traveled around France for while. A particularly difficult sea voyage persuaded Roland to return and complete his studies.

The young student moved to Paris in 1660 to continue his studies in Philosophy and Theology, staying at the college of Bons Amis. He joined several pious associations such as the “Friends Association” of the Jesuit Jean Bagot and one of Vincent de Paul. He even considered joining the Jesuits. He was also quite interested in the work of the missionaries for a time and considered going to Siam after finishing his doctorate on theology. He was given a well-endowed canonry at Reims Cathedral, before being ordained a deacon and was highly regarded as a preacher, but realized that his elegant style reached few of the faithful. In 1664 he received the diaconate and on 3 March 1665 he was ordained a priest.

=== Apostolic Life ===
In 1666 he left his parents' house, moving to a house on Barbâtre Street in Reims, where he began a life of poverty dedicated to charity. He established contacts with the Saint Nicolas-du-Chardonnet seminary where his uncle worked, and there he was exposed to the ideas of Adrian Bourdoise, Jean-Jacques Olier and the movement for the renewal of the French clergy. Of all his apostolic activities, education was the activity to which the young canon is most attracted, especially after the publication in 1668 of “Bans” by Charles Démia, an early advocate of schools for the poor.

He also spent some months living at the church of Saint-Amand in Rouen under the staircase in complete poverty, following the teachings of Antoine de la Haye. In Rouen he met yet another clergyman passionate about education for the poor, the Minim Father Nicolas Barre, who arrived in the city in 1659. Barre had organized a group of men and women who worked in free schools located in several neighbourhoods of the city. Roland returned to Reims with the intention of starting similar projects there.

On 15 October 1670 a Reims' orphanage founded by Marie Varlet was entrusted to him and he gradually transformed it into a real school. He asked Fr. Barre to send two teachers from the Sisters of the Infant Jesus to help. On 27 December 1670 the teachers, Francoise Duval and Anne Le Coeur, arrived. Roland would later found with them the Congregation of Sisters of the Holy Child Jesus, dedicated to the education of poor and abandoned girls.

=== La Salle ===
In 1672 he met a young canon, John Baptist de la Salle, and for a time became his spiritual advisor. They stayed in touch while La Salle studied at the seminary of Saint-Sulpice in Paris. Roland influenced La Salle to learn a type of spiritual detachment that he would later demonstrate when he became founder of the Institute of the Brothers of the Christian Schools.

== Sisters of the Holy Child Jesus ==
After the death of his father in 1673, Roland became more involved in encouraging the growing community of the “Sisters of the Holy Child Jesus”. He also took care of some neighborhood schools and the orphanage. On 13 July he opened the first school of the sisters, doing so at his own expense. He felt confident in teaching girls, but he didn't know how to proceed as to boys, he tried to involve De La Salle in the masculine teaching, however unsuccessfully.

In 1675 he received approbation from Archbishop Charles Maurice Le Tellier regarding the formation of the order of the sisters. They were officially named “Sisters of the Holy Child Jesus”, owing to their devotion in their veneration to the Carmelo de Beaune, their favorite place for peregrination. He describes many spiritual works and publishes the manifest “Notices for the regular people”. One of the notices left for the sisters reads:

The sacred fire must embrace the sisters, it makes them inflame the others and above all the teachers, the students and all the people they come in contact with, That way with their example and edifying words, they will do good as the divine providence wishes, With this fire they will love thy neighbor, God does not wish to divide the charity with which we love him with we must give this one equally to all humanity. This is the principle on which we must encourage the teaching of girls in the schools, not making any distinction of their human and natural qualities.

The following year he gave all his possessions to consolidate the young congregation, he also increased his activities in favor of the needed. He suffered some misunderstandings with the cathedratic board and the church authorities. He also made some trips to Paris looking for the civil recognition of his community, however the process was delayed.

During the months of March and April 1678 he participates in a big predication and apostolic campaign helped by the priests of the Oratory. On 30 March he assisted with great joy to the first mass of his appointed John Baptist de La Salle. He encouraged De La Salle to trade his sinecure for a small parish but the archbishop opposed it and the matter remained unsettled.

=== Sickness, death and legacy ===
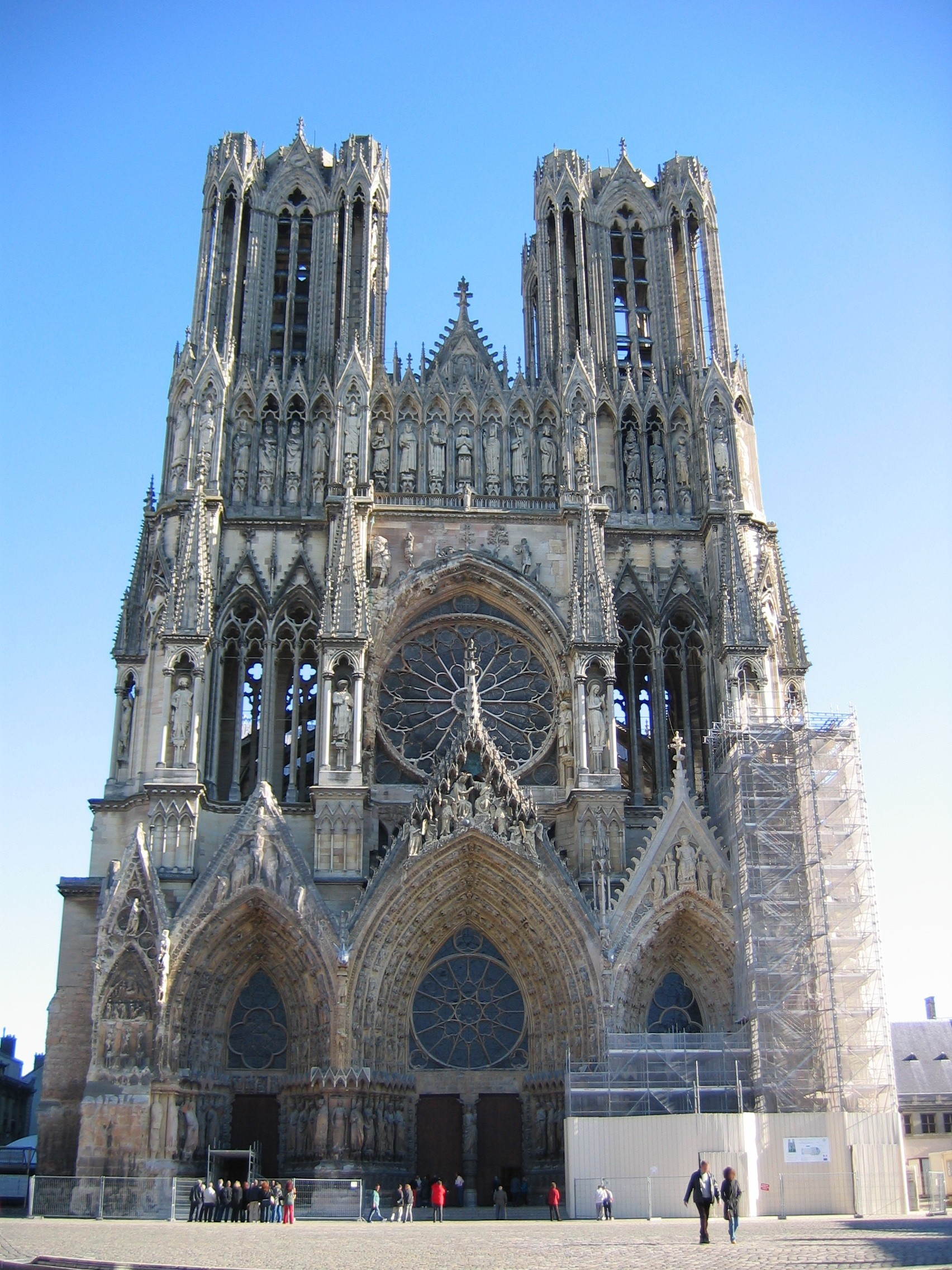
Occidental facade at the Reims cathedral.

On 19 April 1678 he had to stay in bed due to a severe headache. On the 23rd of the same month he redacted his testament, leaving the order to finish the institute to John Baptist de La Salle and Nicolas Rogier. On the 27th he died peacefully at Reims, and was buried in the sisters' chapel on the 29th. He was only 36 years old and yet he left behind a huge apostolic project, even if it only had 20 sisters, an asylum and four schools.

De La Salle then continued with the approbation of his work and later on followed in his footsteps, founding the congregation of the Institute of the Brothers of the Christian Schools for the human and Christian education for the poor.

Nicolas Roland was blessed in Rome by Pope John Paul II on 16 October 1994, along with Josefina Vannini, Alberto Hurtado Cruchaga, Petra de San Jose Perez Florido and Maria Rafols as a preliminary step towards canonization. His remains now rest in a crypt at the Reims Cathedral.

== Writings ==
- "Short Treatise of the virtues that are necessary for the Sisters of the child Jesus", Traité Petit traité des vertus les plus nécessaires aux sœurs, qu’on a trouvé écrit de la main de M. le Théologal, où il exprime ses sentiments sur la Communauté in French.
- "Advise to regular people", Avis donnés par feu Monsieur Nicolas Roland, Théologal de Reims, pour la conduite des personnes régulières in French.
- "Conferences about perfection", Première Conférence faite par le sieur Théologal à la Communauté du Saint Enfant-Jésus, sur ces paroles: «soyez parfaits, comme votre Père Céleste est parfait» in French.
- "Memorial to the Archbishop of Reims", Mémoires sur la Vie de Monsieur Nicolas Roland, prêtre, Chanoine Théologal de l’Église de Reims, et Fondateur de la Communauté du Saint-Enfant-Jésus in French.
- Correspondence: Recueil des Lettres écrites par la main de Monsieur Nicolas Roland, Théologal, à plusieurs de ses pénitentes in French.

== Roland's Pedagogy ==
Roland's pedagogy has much to do with his own life: humble, simple, natural, but also ambitious and compromising, even captivating and contagious:

- It is cutting edge pedagogy, for pioneering works of popular education.
- Ascetic and mystical at once, said that the life of man is great if understood as a struggle and surrender to divine service.
- The most valuable of his attitude was his testimony and his passion. Traits that were considered irreplaceable educational values in their masterpieces. With them, he adorned the Christian school for girls that he designed and easy ideas to their teachers who offered selfless and generous people grouped with effort and trust in God.

Nicolas Roland is one of the teachers who made possible in the 17th century the spread of popular schools, predecessor next to Saint Pierre Fourier and Charles Demia of what would later become the popular schools from the church, especially in the work of John the Baptist De La Salle.

== Bibliography ==
- Aroz, L.M. (1972). Nicolas Roland, Jean-Baptiste de La Salle et les Sœurs de l'Enfant-Jésus de Reims. Cahiers lasalliens. Vol. 38. Reims.
- Aroz, L.M. (1995). The succession of Nicolas Roland, chanoine théologal de l'église Notre-Dame de Reims. Cahiers lasalliens. Vol. 53. Paris.
- Hanesse, A. (1888). Vie de Nicolas Roland. Reims.
- Bernoville, G., Un précurseur de saint Jean-Baptiste de La Salle: Nicolás Roland, fondateur de la Congrégation du Saint Enfant Jésus de Reims, Paris, 1950.
- Goy, J. La vie de Nicolas Roland, Reims, 1993
- Chico, P. Nicolás Roland en Fundadores de órdenes religiosas de la enseñanza, Valladolid, 2000.
- GALLEGO, S. San Juan Bautista de La Salle: vida y pensamiento, BAC, Madrid, 1986 ISBN 84-220-1232-4
- CAMPOS, M., SAUVAGE, M., Juan Bautista de La Salle: Anunciar el evangelio a los pobres, Bruño, Lima, 1977.
- BÉDEL, H., Orígenes 1651-1726, Estudios Lasalianos nº5, Rome, 1998
