= Álvaro Rodríguez =

Álvaro Rodríguez may refer to:

- Álvaro Rodríguez (nobleman) (1129-1167), Galician magnate and nobleman
- Álvaro Rodríguez (footballer, 1936–2018), Spanish football defender and manager
- Álvaro Rodríguez Echeverría (born 1942), Costa Rican priest
- Álvaro Rodríguez (athlete) (born 1987), Spanish middle-distance runner
- Álvaro Rodríguez (footballer, born 1994), Spanish football right-back
- Álvaro Rodríguez (footballer, born 2004), Spanish football forward

== See also ==
- Alvaro Rodrigues (born 1993), Brazilian football midfielder
