= Canossa Academy Lipa =

Location
- Brgy. San Carlos; Lipa City, Batangas; Philippines
- 14°38′20″N 121°4′40″E

Information
- Former names: Our Lady of the Rosary Academy (1967-1973)
- Type: Private, Catholic
- Motto: We Form Hearts
- Religious affiliation: Roman Catholic (Canossian Sisters)
- Established: 1967
- Principal: Grade School - Mrs. Gina Martinez; High School - Sr. Nancy Edusma
- Directress: Sr. Lilia U. Nuesca
- Enrollment: over 2,000
- Campus: Urban 3 hectares
- Colors: Blue and white
- Mascot: Canossian Canines
- Nickname: Canossians
- Affiliations: PAASCU
- Website: calc.edu.ph

Canossa Academy is a school in Lipa City, Batangas, Philippines. It is one of the four schools owned and administered by the Canossian Sisters, who belong to the religious congregation named the Canossian Daughters of Charity which originated in Verona, Italy. They came to the Philippines in 1954 from the Canossian Province of Hong Kong to open apostolic missions.

== History ==
=== St. Magdalene of Canossa ===
Magdalene of Canossa was born into the family of the Marquises of Canossa in Verona on 1 March 1774. She would choose to live the Gospel for God, through service of the poor.

On 8 May 1808, she started her work using her inheritance, gathering and educating young girls at her lodgings. This religious convent, named Institute of the Daughters of Charity extended to other Italian cities: Venice, Milan, Bergamo, and Trent after approvals from Pope Pius VII.

She would go on to found the Canossa Academy after the Institute traveled to the Philippines in 1860.

She died in Verona on 10 April 1835. She was proclaimed Blessed by Pope Pius XII on 8 December 1941 and canonized by Pope John Paul II on 2 October 1988.

== Campus and Values ==
=== Core Values ===
Canossa Academy's main focuses are religious values. They aim to follow the original teachings of Magdalene of Canossa, who founded the school. The school advocates for learners to be of service to the poor, and of service to God.

=== Campus ===
Canossa Academy consists of three buildings spread out across a 3 hectare campus. They are called The St. Joshephine Bakhita building, The St. Magdalene of Canossa building, and The Mother Dalisay building.

The campus includes chapels, basketball courts, and volleyball courts.

== Publications ==
=== Grade school ===
- Gazette Jr.
- Pintig

=== Junior High School ===
- Canossian Gazette

=== Senior High School ===
- Canossian Gazette Newsletter

== Notable alumni ==
- Br. Armin Luistro FSC – former president De La Salle University-Manila, and current secretary of the Department of Education.
- Oscar L. Gozos – former Congressman of the 4th district of Batangas and former mayor of Lipa City.
