= Suzanne Kohn (aviator) =

French aviator

Suzanne Kohn was a French aviator.

Kohn was born in Paris to a wealthy Jewish family; one of four children, her sister Antoinette would later become a noted painter and French Resistance fighter.

In 1939, Kohn flew a Caudron C.600 Aiglon aircraft from Orly, France, to Madagascar. She departed on 25 May, reached Elisabethville on 13 June, and Ivato on 19 June. On her return flight she stopped in Egypt, Syria and Tripolitania, Libya.
