= Adrian Nyel =

French educator

Adrian Nyel was a 17th-century French educator. Nyel was a layman, who was in charge of the house for the poor in Rouen, France, where he also oversaw the education of poor boys, along with supervising poorly paid teachers. This charge was given by Pierre Lambert de la Motte in 1656.

== Life ==
Nyel was an administrator at the General Hospice of Rouen, which provided various social services for the poor, including education. With the help of Nicholas Barré, he recruited young men as teachers for the poor boys of Rouen. He had already opened four schools in Rouen under civic administration when Mme Jeanne Dubois Maillefer, a wealthy lady of Rouen, gave the fifty-nine year old Nyel money and encouraged him to begin a free school for boys in Reims.

She gave him a letter of introduction to her relative, Father Jean-Baptiste de La Salle. When Nyel arrived in Reims in March 1679, he went to the Sisters of the Infant Jesus, who ran an orphanage and school for poor girls in the town, in order to solicit their help in his project. As it happened, while he was visiting the convent, La Salle arrived. The order had been founded by Nicolas Roland, young La Salle's spiritual director, who had named La Salle one of the executors of his will. The Mother Superior introduced the two men, and La Salle listened to the details of Nyel's project.

As Nyel was new in Reims, and La Salle was aware that the town would not be much in favor of yet another school for the poor, he invited Nyel (along with the fourteen-year-old assistant he had brought with him) to his family home so that a suitable plan might be put together.

Nyel opened his first school in Reims at the parishes of St. Maurice. These were not 'Charity Schools' for those that could pay did pay. Within a few months, word reached him that another wealthy widow in the town wanted to establish a similar school in her parish, but only if La Salle was involved. La Salle agreed to provide some supervision. Shortly afterwards Nyel opened another free school in St-Jacques parish.

Not long after establishing these schools, Nyel went away to begin other schools in outlying areas, leaving La Salle to oversee the schools in Reims. Francis Meehan describes Nyel as brusque and impulsive. The relationship between Nyel, who was thirty-eight years older, and La Salle seems to have been amicable. Nyel had a passion to founding schools, La Salle to see that they were maintained and staffed by trained teachers.

In 1682 Nyel established schools in Rethel, Chateau-Porcien, and Laon. He was frequently away, working to establish schools elsewhere. Nyel ended his years by returning to Rouen and working in the place where he had started. His work led to the Lasallian schools that exist today.
