= Leonor Briones =

Former Secretary of Education of the Philippines, economist, and academic

The Honorable Leonor Magtolis Briones
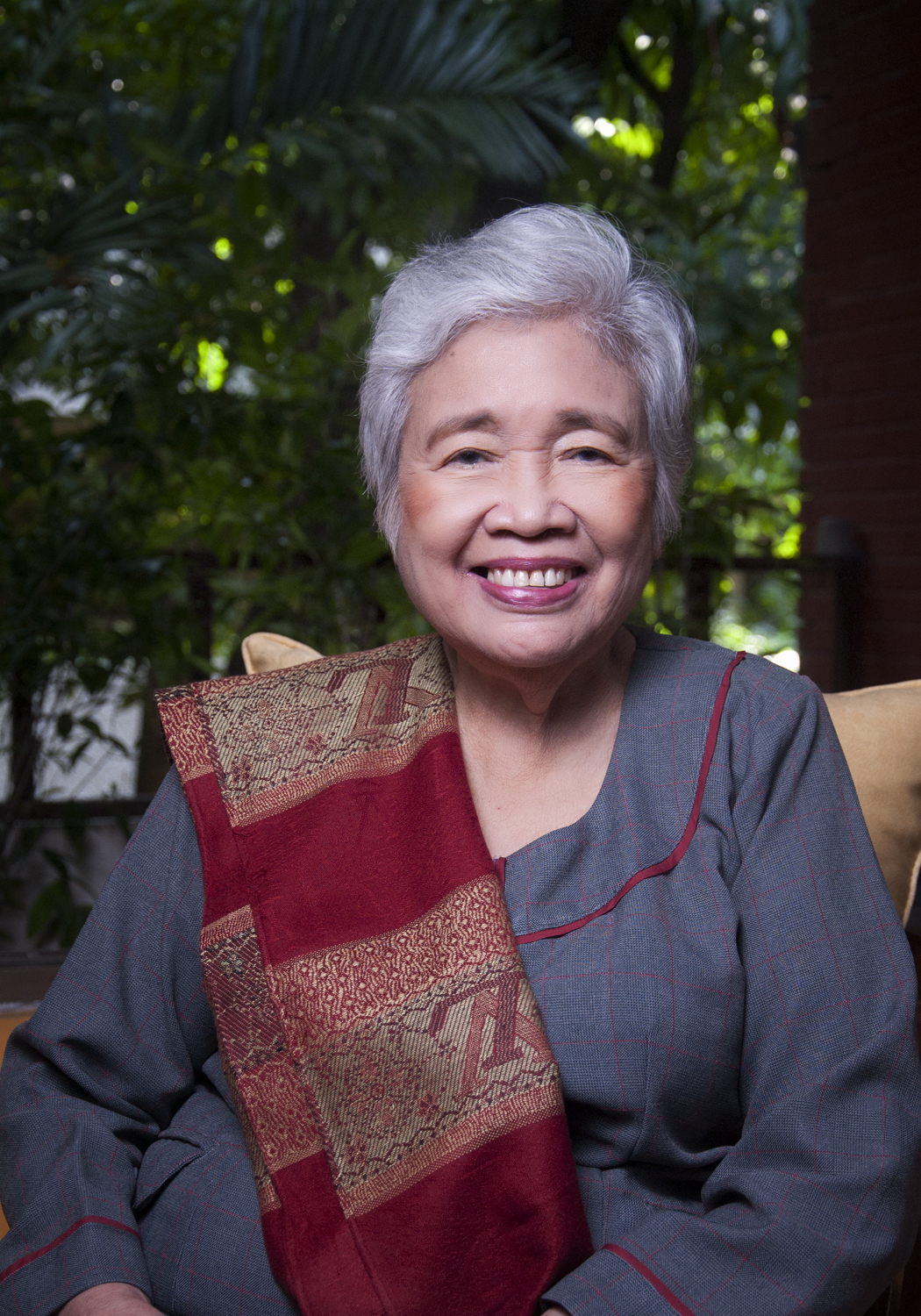
- Official portrait, 2016

52nd Secretary of Education
- In office June 30, 2016 – June 30, 2022
- President: Rodrigo Duterte
- Preceded by: Armin Luistro
- Succeeded by: Sara Duterte

Vice President of the Southeast Asian Ministers of Education Organization
- In office June 18, 2021 – February 8, 2023
- President: Chan Chun Sing; Sara Duterte (2023–2025)
- Preceded by: Ong Ye Kung
- Succeeded by: Romaizah Salleh

21st Treasurer of the Philippines
- In office August 1998 – January 19, 2001
- President: Joseph Estrada
- Preceded by: Caridad Valdehuesa
- Succeeded by: Eduardo Sergio Gonzales Edeza

Personal details
- Born: Leonor Mirasol Magtolis; October 16, 1940 (age 85) Guihulngan, Negros Oriental, Philippine Commonwealth
- Education: Silliman University (BBA); University of the Philippines Diliman (MPA); Leeds University (PGDip)
- Occupation: Economist, Professor, Politician

Leonor "Liling" Mirasol Magtolis-Briones (Tagalog: [lɛˈnɔɾ bɾiˈjonɛs]; born October 16, 1940) is a Filipino academician, economist, and civil servant who served as Secretary of Education under the Duterte administration. She is also professor emeritus of public administration at the National College of Public Administration & Governance (NCPAG) of the University of the Philippines Diliman and was chairman of the board of trustees of Silliman University in Dumaguete.

She is a former Presidential Adviser for Social Development under President Joseph Ejercito Estrada, with the rank of department secretary and was National Treasurer of the Philippines (head of the Bureau of the Treasury) from August 1998 to February 2001.

== Early life and education ==
Leonor Briones was born as Leonor Mirasol Magtolis in Guihulngan, Negros Oriental on October 16, 1940. She was the daughter of Carlos Magtolis Sr., a school teacher, and Ursula Mirasol.

She obtained her Bachelor of Business Administration degree with a major in accounting from Silliman University in 1958 and her Master of Public Administration degree with a major in local government and fiscal administration from the University of the Philippines Diliman in 1967.

In 1968, she acquired her post-graduate diploma, with honors, at Leeds University in England. In 1984, she proceeded to complete further studies in the United States, where she earned a certificate in Policy for Public Enterprise from the Harvard Institute for International Development at Harvard University.

She received her Doctor of Humanities (Honoris Causa) in Public Administration from Central Philippine University in 2016, the sister school of Silliman University.

== Career ==
Briones has served in various capacities. Her stints include teaching public fiscal administration at the University of the Philippines; and serving as secretary to the Commission on Audit for seven years, consultant to the Senate of the Philippines, Asian Development Bank and the United Nations Development Program, lead convenor of Social Watch Philippines, Inc., coordinator of Social Watch Asia, member of the Coordinating Committee of Social Watch International, chair of the board of Focus on the Global South, the first Filipino member of the Club of Rome, director for Policy and Executive Development at the National College of Public Administration and Governance at the University of the Philippines Diliman, and vice-president for finance in the same university. Briones was also active in the private sector, serving as director of AgriNurture, Inc., an office she held since 2008 and as an independent director of Megawide Construction Corp. since July 19, 2010.

She also served as chairman of the board of trustees of Silliman University. In 2010, Briones was nominated for the Presidency of the University of the Philippines but fell short of getting a majority vote from the university's Board of Regents.

On May 28, 2016, then president-elect Rodrigo Duterte offered Briones the Secretary of Education post, which she formally accepted on June 7, 2016. She took office on June 30, 2016. She oversaw the continuation of the K-12 program implementation which began in 2012, and during the COVID-19 pandemic, shifting from physical, face-to-face classes to a blended learning approach due to travel restrictions to prevent the spread of the disease. After her stint as the education secretary ended, her successor, Sara Duterte, appointed her as a consultant.

== Awards and distinctions ==
Briones is an Outstanding Sillimanian Awardee in the field of Fiscal and Public Administration. In 2005, she addressed the UN General Assembly where she appealed to the member-nations of the United Nations to fulfill their promises in fighting poverty. In 2011, she was one of the few individuals who received the prestigious Bayi Citation Award for Government Service.

=== Professor emeritus conferment ===
The University of the Philippines's Board of Regents (BOR), the national university's highest policy-making body, formally conferred upon Briones in 2012 the rank of professor emeritus of public administration. Currently, she and Dr. Alex B. Brillantes, Jr., a former Dean of National College of Public Administration and Governance, are the only living professors emeritus of the College.

Political offices
Preceded by Caridad Valdehuesa	National Treasurer of the Philippines; 1998-2001	Succeeded by Eduardo Sergio Gonzales Edeza
Preceded by Armin Luistro	Secretary of Education; 2016–2022	Succeeded by Sara Duterte
Order of precedence
Preceded by Roger Mercado as Secretary of Public Works and Highways	Order of Precedence of the Philippines as Secretary of Education	Succeeded by Silvestre Bello III as Secretary of Labor and Employment
