= Armin Luistro =

Lasallian Brother and Former Secretary of Education of the Philippines (born 1961)

Brother Armin Luistro FSC
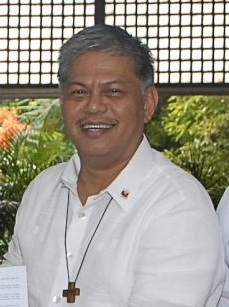
- Luistro in 2016

28th Superior General of the Institute of the Brothers of the Christian Schools
- Incumbent
- Assumed office May 18, 2022
- Preceded by: Robert Schieler

51st Secretary of Education
- In office June 30, 2010 – June 30, 2016
- President: Benigno Aquino III
- Preceded by: Mona Valisno
- Succeeded by: Leonor Briones

20th President of De La Salle University
- In office May 2006 – June 30, 2010
- Preceded by: Carmelita Quebengco
- Succeeded by: Narciso Erguiza

2nd Chancellor of De La Salle University
- In office May 2006 – June 30, 2010
- Preceded by: Carmelita Quebengco
- Succeeded by: Ricardo Laguda

1st President and CEO of De La Salle Philippines
- In office November 29, 2005 – May 2009
- Preceded by: Position established
- Succeeded by: Ricardo Laguda

2nd President of De La Salle University System
- In office April 2004 – May 2006
- Preceded by: Andrew Gonzalez
- Succeeded by: None (deprecated by De La Salle Philippines)

7th Provincial of De La Salle Brothers Philippine District
- In office April 1997 – 2003
- Preceded by: Raymundo Suplido
- Succeeded by: Edmundo Fernandez

Personal details
- Born: Armin Altamirano Luistro; December 24, 1961 (age 64) Lipa, Batangas, Philippines
- Education: De La Salle University (BA, MA); University of St. La Salle (PhD)
- Occupation: Religious brother
- Profession: Academic

Religious life
- Religion: Christianity
- Denomination: Catholic Church
- Institute: De La Salle Brothers
- Profession: 1988 (final vows)

Armin Altamirano Luistro (born December 24, 1961) is a Filipino Lasallian Brother who served as secretary of the Department of Education of the Philippines under President Benigno Aquino III. He is the first Asian Superior General of the Institute of the Brothers of the Christian Schools or De La Salle Brothers worldwide. Luistro entered De La Salle Scholasticate (the center for academic training of De La Salle Brothers to become full-fledged educators) in Manila in April 1979 while he was studying in De La Salle University (DLSU). He received the religious habit of the congregation in October 1981 at the La Salle Novitiate in Lipa. He professed his first religious vows in October 1982, and his final vows in May 1988.

He started teaching as a religion teacher at De La Salle Lipa in 1983. He was made provincial of the De La Salle Brothers Philippine District in April 1997, a post he held until 2003. On August 26, 2000, Luistro co-founded the De La Salle Catholic University Manado, in Indonesia with Josef Suwatan, Roman Catholic Bishop of Manado.

In April 2004, he succeeded Andrew Gonzalez as the president of De La Salle University System, consequently making him the president of eight De La Salle institutions. He worked into establishing De La Salle Philippines (DLSP) which replaced the system. The DLSP National Mission Council appointed him DLSP President and Chief Executive Officer on November 29, 2005.

He was appointed as the Secretary of Education of the Philippines on June 30, 2010, becoming the second De La Salle brother to hold the post—the other was Gonzalez who was in office from 1998 to 2001. Luistro has the least net worth among Aquino's cabinet. He had ₱89,000 (US$2,060). In contrast, the richest—Cesar Purisima who is Secretary of Finance—had ₱252 million (US$5.84 million).

The Alliance of Concerned Teachers (ACT) have expressed skepticism over Luistro's stand on sex education citing his religious background. Nevertheless, the Department of Education has included sex education in its curriculum for grade 5 to fourth year high school. Roman Catholic groups have criticized it for allegedly not covering the emotional, psychological and spiritual dimensions of sexuality.

Luistro is a major proponent of the K+12 Basic Education Program in the Philippines, and personally managed the implementation of R.A. 10533 or the K-12 Law as the Education Secretary. The program sought to add two years to the previous 10-year basic education curriculum. Numerous parties had opposed the plan including Ateneo de Manila University President Bienvenido Nebres and progressive groups of students, teachers and parents.

== Educational background ==
Luistro was born on December 24, 1961, to José Dimayuga Luistro and Magdalena Aranda Altamirano-Luistro in Lipa, Batangas, Philippines. He attended first grade at Our Lady of the Rosary Academy in Lipa, grades 2 to 5 at Canossa Academy Lipa, and graduated elementary and high school at De La Salle Lipa. He pursued his undergraduate studies at De La Salle University in Manila under a scholarship, and was conferred Bachelor of Arts in Philosophy and Letters in March 1981. When asked in a Manila Bulletin interview in 2009, he shared that he had spent most of his education in Batangas, and since DLSU had no uniforms, he "wore all the badúy [unfashionable] type of shirts", as he put it, using the Tagalog word for "unfashionable", while most of his classmates were from elite high schools. Thus he says "I supposed [they] laughed at me."

In 1981 he entered into a program in Ateneo de Manila University, and was awarded a Certificate in Formation Institute for Religious Educators in 1985. He enrolled in a graduate program in DLSU in 1991, and was conferred a Master of Arts degree in Religious Education in 1993. He also graduated with a master's degree in religious education and values formation at the same university in 2003. He was conferred a doctorate degree in educational management with the highest Academic Excellence Award and Most Outstanding Dissertation in May 2005 at the University of St. La Salle in Bacolod.

He was made Doctor of Humane Letters, honoris causa, by La Salle University in Philadelphia, Pennsylvania, United States on May 9, 2004.

== Religious and academic career ==
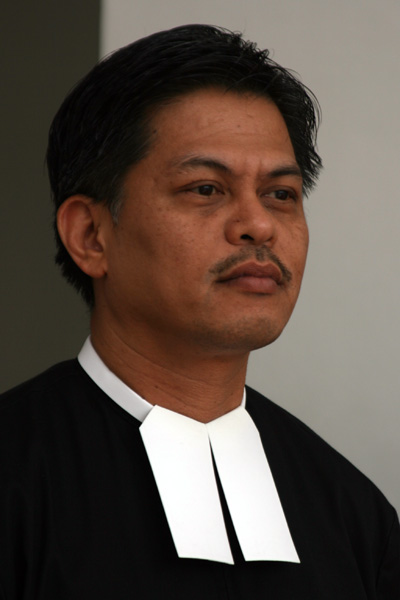
Armin A. Luístro FSC in 2008, dressed in the characteristic neck bands of the La Salle Brothers

Luistro entered the De La Salle Scholasticate (the center for academic training of De La Salle Brothers) in Manila in April 1979, and received the religious habit in October 1981 at the La Salle Novitiate in Lipa. He professed his first religious vows in October 1982, and his final vows in May 1988. In the Manila Bulletin interview, he said that teaching was the reason why he entered the congregation.

He started teaching as a religion teacher at De La Salle Lipa in 1983. He moved to La Salle Greenhills in 1986. He was made provincial of the De La Salle Brothers Philippine District in April 1997, a post he held until 2003.

On August 26, 2000, Luistro co-founded the De La Salle Catholic University of Manado, currently known as De La Salle University, in Indonesia with Josef Suwatan, Roman Catholic Bishop of Manado. DLSU in Manila supervised initial operations before it was transferred to the Philippine District.

On April 2004, he succeeded Andrew Gonzalez as the president of De La Salle University System, consequently making him the president of eight De La Salle institutions. In his inaugural speech, he acknowledged the "multiversity" concept of Gonzalez who established the system. In which structure, DLSU served as the flagship while other De La Salle institutions specialized in fields like agriculture, alternative education and medicine.

He did, however, find the system's structure unfeasible. He worked into establishing De La Salle Philippines which replaced the system. Under the reorganization, other De La Salle institutions were included in the network—a total of 17. Each De La Salle institution was autonomous and had its own president. The DLSP National Mission Council appointed him DLSP President and Chief Executive Officer on November 29, 2005.

Luistro and 18 other people were appointed as members of the Dicastery for Institutes of Consecrated Life and Societies of Apostolic Life of the Roman Curia by Pope Leo XIV on June 24, 2025.

== Political involvement ==
Luistro called for the resignation of President Gloria Macapagal Arroyo during the height of the Hello Garci scandal in 2005. In which time, he became close to the Aquino family, a prominent political family in the Philippines. He also delivered a eulogy (named Cory, the Heart of a Saint) during the wake of former President Corazon Aquino, and said "our closeness with her was really borne out of that period [Hello Garci scandal], none of her children went to La Salle."

=== Work at the Department of Education ===
President Benigno Aquino III, Corazon's son, appointed him as the secretary of the Department of Education. He was inaugurated on June 30, 2010, becoming the second De La Salle brother to hold the post—the other was Gonzalez who was in office from 1998 to 2001.

Aquino gave Luistro two years to address problems, including insufficient books, classrooms and teachers. Luistro estimated that there were a lack of 130,000 teachers; 72,000 classrooms; 7 million desks; 141,000 comfort rooms; and 96 million books. In his 2013 State of the Nation Address or SONA, Aquino praised Bro. Luistro for successfully erasing the shortages of resources and classrooms inherited from the previous administrations.

As of December 2010, Luistro has the least net worth among Aquino's cabinet. He had ₱89,000 (US$2,060). In contrast, the richest—Cesar Purisima who is Secretary of Finance—had ₱252 million (US$5.84 million). He declared an annual gross salary of ₱989,496 (US$22,900).

==== Sex education ====
Given his affiliation to a Catholic religious order [sic], his constitutionally mandated obligation to uphold secular education will immediately be put to the test on the issue of sex education. Is he prepared to stand up to opposition from the Catholic church?

— Antonio Tinio (ACT spokesperson), Manila Bulletin

The Alliance of Concerned Teachers (ACT) have expressed skepticism over Luistro's stand on sex education citing his religious background. Meanwhile, Luistro's predecessor, Mona Valisno expressed her confidence with Luistro.

The Department of Education has included sex education in its curriculum for fifth grade to fourth year high school, which is still included in the K-12 program. Roman Catholic groups have criticized it for allegedly not covering the emotional, psychological and spiritual dimensions of sexuality. Likewise, former Roman Catholic Archbishop of Lingayen-Dagupan Oscar V. Cruz criticized Luistro for his alleged lack of comment regarding the Reproductive Health Bill, which proposes to integrate sex education in public schools. He appealed Luistro to "stop teaching lewd studies [sex education] in schools" (trans.).

Luistro stated that sex education was not his priority. He instead wanted to focus on streamlining the bureaucracy of DepEd, which employs 600,000 employees (501,158 of which are teachers). In line with this, he announced on December 28, 2010, that DepEd would terminate all of its 67 consultants by the end of the year. The DepEd-National Employees Union, in response, has called for his resignation. Luistro argued, however, that "streamlining is a must" as bulk of the department's budget goes to funding the salary of its employees.

==== K+12 Basic Education Program ====
Luistro is a major proponent of the K+12 Basic Education Program in the Philippines. The program seeks to add two years to the current 10-year basic education curriculum, and make graduates more competitive. The program involves kindergarten, six years of elementary, four years of junior high school, and two years of senior high school. Kindergarten was required in 2012 while senior high school is planned to be included in the curriculum by 2016. DepEd said that 77 percent of its participants in fora are in favor of the change. Before its implementation in 2012, the Philippines was the only country in Asia which employed 10 years of basic education—all other countries had 12. Numerous parties have opposed the plan including Ateneo de Manila University President Bienvenido Nebres and progressive groups of students, teachers and parents. A spokesperson of No To K–12 Alliance said:

The fact that it will aggravate the financial burden of parents and that the Aquino proposed education budget cannot resolve the shortages even under the current 10-year system clearly explains the program's foolishness. The education budget clearly explains why the K-12 program is a stupid move. Education budgets for the past years were unable to resolve the ballooning shortages in basic education and with the current proposed budget under Aquino, the shortages will continue to balloon. Adding two years will just add salt to the already rotting wound of basic education.

— Ayla Garduce, The Daily Tribune

==== Indigenous framework of education ====
Luistro signed on behalf of the Deped the national policy framework for Indigenous peoples education in 2011. The framework aims to address Indigenous peoples' lack of access to "culture-responsive basic education". The framework directs DepEd offices and units to ensure that textbooks and other learning materials are free from discriminatory and erroneous content that misrepresent the history and culture of Indigenous peoples.

== Non-academic work ==
Luistro is also the president of the largest business NGO in the country, the Philippine Business for Social Progress (PBSP). He has held various positions in other governmental and intergovernmental organisations, such as the Advisory Council of the National Youth Commission (NYC), the UNESCO National Commission of the Philippines and the South East Asian Ministers of Education Organisation (SEAMEO).

On June 24 of 2025, Pope Leo XIV also named him as a member of the Dicastery for Institutes of Consecrated Life and Societies of Apostolic Life making him the first Filipino and Asian descent to hold the position. As stated on the Vatican's website, the dicastery is a section of the Roman Curia tasked with promoting, supporting, and overseeing the implementation of evangelical counsels.

== Honors ==
Bro. Luistro has been honored with the eponymous Bro. Armin Luistro Park at the Kalipay Elementary School in Gingoog City. For his work in human rights, Bro. Luistro has also been awarded as one of the first Most Distinguished Human Rights Defenders by Amnesty International in 2020. He was awarded the 2023 Gawad Bukas Palad Award by the Ateneo De Manila University for exhibiting the Ignatian spirit of generosity in giving back to the poor and the suffering.

In 2016, Bro. Luistro was awarded the Order of Lakandula by Pres. Benigno Aquino for his legacy as Education Secretary.

Armin Luistro succession and navigation boxes
Academic offices
Preceded by Raymundo Suplido	Provincial of De La Salle Brothers Philippine District; 1997–2003	Succeeded by Edmundo Fernandez
Preceded by Andrew Gonzalez	President of De La Salle University System; 2004–2006	Deprecated by De La Salle Philippines
New office	President and CEO of De La Salle Philippines; 2005–2009	Succeeded by Ricardo Laguda
Preceded by Carmelita Quebengco	Chancellor of De La Salle University; 2006–2010	Succeeded by Ricardo Laguda
Preceded by Carmelita Quebengco	President of De La Salle University; 2006–2010	Succeeded by Narciso Erguiza
Government offices
Preceded by Mona Valisno	Secretary of Education; 2010–2016	Succeeded by Leonor Briones

Catholic Church titles
Preceded by Robert Schieler	Superior General; De La Salle Brothers; 2022 to present	Incumbent
