= Robert Schieler =

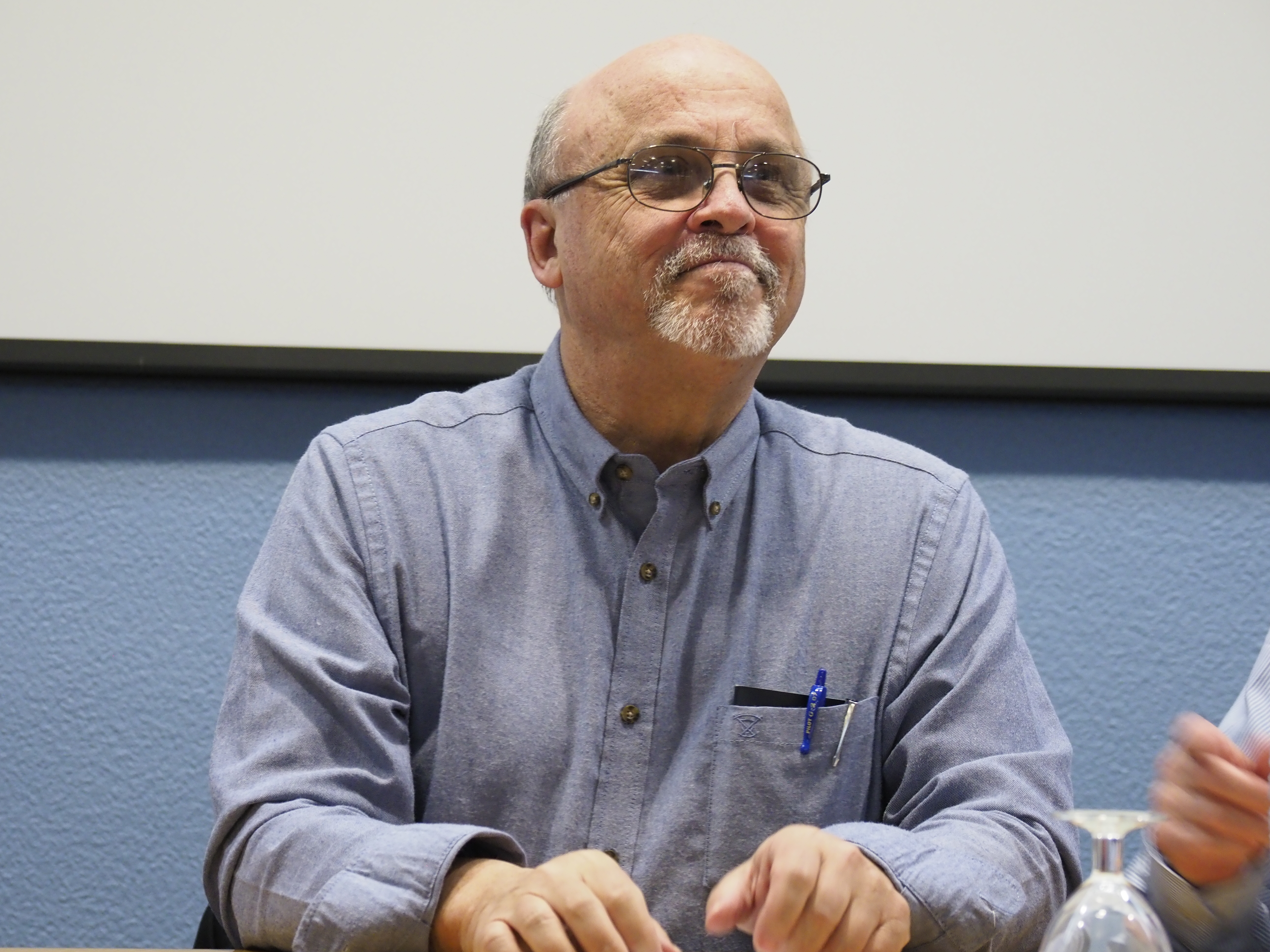
Brother Robert Schieler in 2018

Robert Schieler, FSC (born 1950) is an American Catholic who serves as a member of the Brothers of the Christian Schools. He was elected superior general of his religious community on May 20, 2014.

== Background ==
After completing his studies in Modern European History and a PhD in educational administration, worked as a teacher in the U.S. and, after making his final profession in 1979, he worked as a missionary 13 years in the Philippines.

In his congregation Schieler made several managerial tasks: Auxiliary Visitor of the District of Baltimore from 1991 to 1998, Director of Education for the USA- Toronto Region from 1998 to 2001 and Visitor of his district since 2001 to 2007. Beginning in 2007, he was his order's General Counsel for the United States and Canada.

Since 2011, he has served on the Board of Trustees of Saint Mary's University of Minnesota. He was elected superior general of his religious community in Rome on May 20, 2014.

Catholic Church titles
Preceded by Álvaro Rodríguez Echeverría	Superior General; De La Salle Brothers; 2014 to 2022	Succeeded by Armin Luistro
