= Church of Saint John the Baptiste of La Salle =

Church in Paris, France

Coordinates: 48.8412°N 2.3124°E

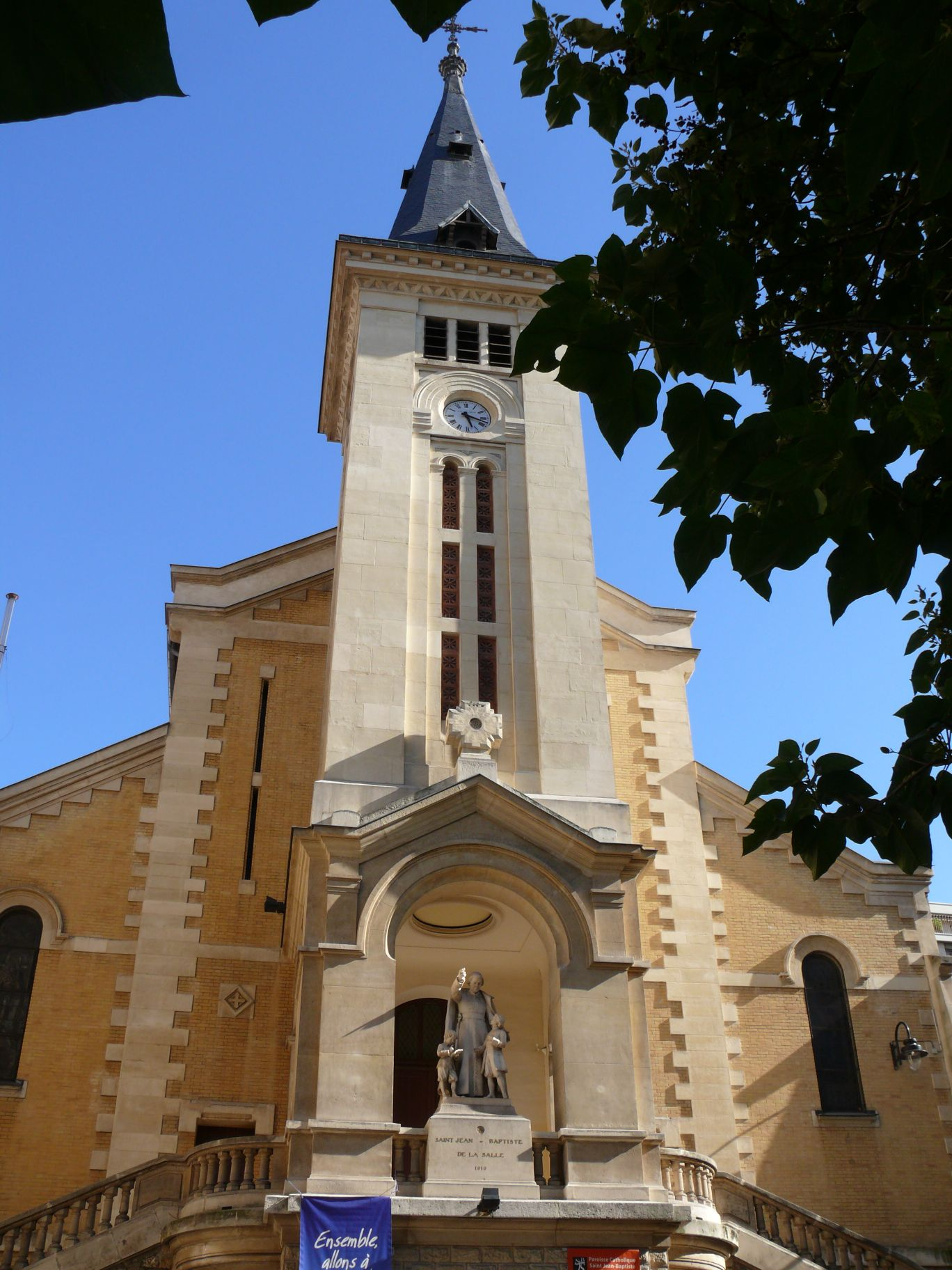

Religion
- Affiliation: Roman Catholic
- District: 15th arrondissement
- Region: Ile-de-France

Location
- Country: France
- Interactive map of Church of Saint John the Baptiste of La Salle

Architecture
- Groundbreaking: 1909
- Completed: 1910

The Church of Saint John the Baptiste of La Salle (French: église Saint-Jean-Baptiste-de-La-Salle) is a Catholic church located in the Necker quartier of the 15th arrondissement of Paris, dedicated to Jean-Baptiste de La Salle, founder of the 18th century Brothers of Christian schools and patron saint of educators.

== History ==
The ancient crypt was transformed in 1922 into a small oratory located on the ground floor of the church, with independent access.

Father Patrick O'Mahony is the current parish priest since 2018, succeeding Alexis Leproux, the Vicar general of the diocese of Paris.

== Organ ==
The organ was created by Joseph Merklin (around 1850/1870), consisting of 28 stops, 3 manuals of 56 notes and a 30-note pedalboard. It is operated mechanically with a Barker lever on the Great Organ. The organist Adrien Levassor has been its organist since December 2013, succeeding Sophie-Véronique Cauchefer-Choplin, and before her, Christian Ott.

== See also ==
- List of religious buildings in Paris
- Archdiocese of Paris
