= Antoinette Sasse =

French painter (1897–1986)

Antoinette Sasse (French pronunciation: [ɑ̃twanɛt sas]; née Kohn, 18 June 1897 – 23 December 1986) was a French artist, and a prominent member of the French Resistance during World War II.

== Biography ==
Sasse was born in Paris to a wealthy Jewish family; one of four children, her sister Suzanne would later become a noted aviator. She was a pupil of Henri Matisse and a friend and pupil of Léger, Soutine, Friesz and Van Dongen. She painted in the Fauvism style, exhibiting her work in many Parisian galleries.

Sasse met Jean Moulin in November 1936 and assisted him with his work of establishing a French resistance movement. In June 1940, when the fall of Paris was imminent, she and Moulin moved the papers of Pierre Cot, which documented Cot's work at the French Ministry of the Air, from Paris to a safe house in Chartres. From 1942, she supervised the running of an art gallery in Nice which was a cover for Moulin's activities in the area. She was also part of the Gilbert network led by her brother-in-law, Colonel Georges Groussard, and coded and de-coded messages from the resistance to Charles de Gaulle in London. Following Moulin's death in 1943 as a result of torture by the Gestapo, Sasse returned to France from Switzerland and worked with Moulin's sister to uncover the circumstances of his arrest, detainment and death. She was later awarded the Resistance Medal.

On her death in 1986, Sasse left her estate to the city of Paris for the establishment of the Musee Jean Moulin, which was opened in 1994.

=== Personal life ===
Sasse was married to a merchant, Raymond Sachs, from 1920 to their divorce in 1933. She was later in a relationship with the poet Paul Geraldy, during which time Moulin asked her to marry him; she declined his proposal.
