= Musée du Général Leclerc de Hauteclocque et de la Libération de Paris – Musée Jean Moulin =

Museum in Paris, France

Coordinates: 48°50′26″N 2°19′11″E

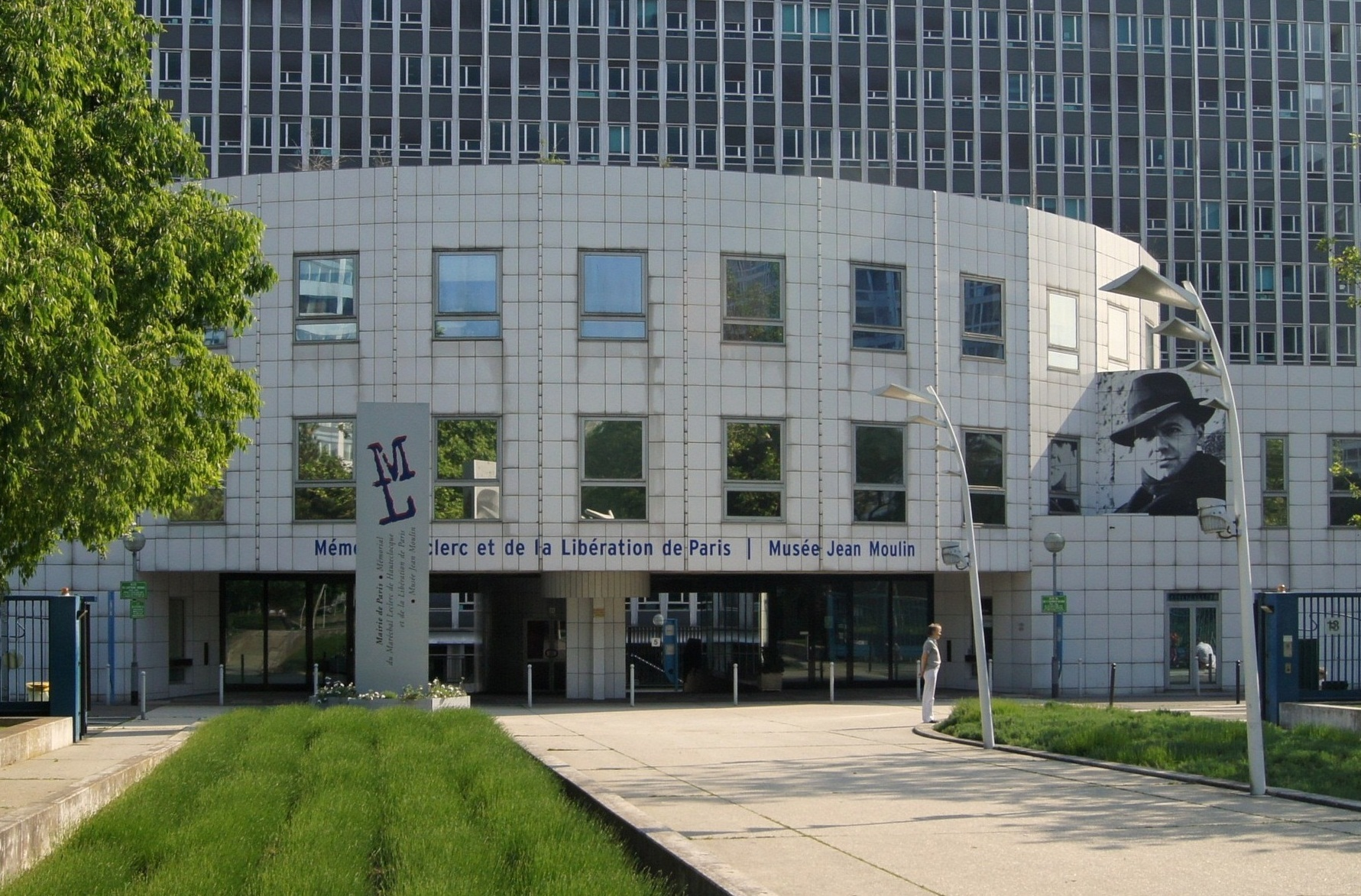
The entrance to the museum

The Musée du Général Leclerc de Hauteclocque et de la Libération de Paris – Musée Jean Moulin (French pronunciation: [myze dy ʒeneʁal ləklɛʁ də otklɔk e d(ə) la libeʁɑsjɔ̃ d(ə) paʁi myze ʒɑ̃ mulɛ̃]) was a museum located in the 15th arrondissement of Paris at 23, Allée de la 2e DB, Jardin Atlantique, Paris, France. It was open daily except Mondays; as of 2022 admission is free of charge.

The museum opened in 1994 as Musée Jean Moulin to commemorate Jean Moulin, a major figure of the French Resistance, and the occupation of Paris during World War II. A prominent member of the French Resistance, Antoinette Sasse, bequeathed funds in her will to assist in the establishment of the museum. Its accompanying museum, the Musée du Général Leclerc de Hauteclocque et de la Libération de Paris, commemorates Maréchal Philippe Leclerc de Hauteclocque and the liberation of Paris.

The museum moved to the Ledoux Pavilion in the Place Denfert-Rochereau in the 14th arrondissement and was opened in October 2019, in time to mark the 75th anniversary of the liberation of Paris.

== See also ==
- List of museums in Paris
