= Álvaro Rodríguez Echeverría =

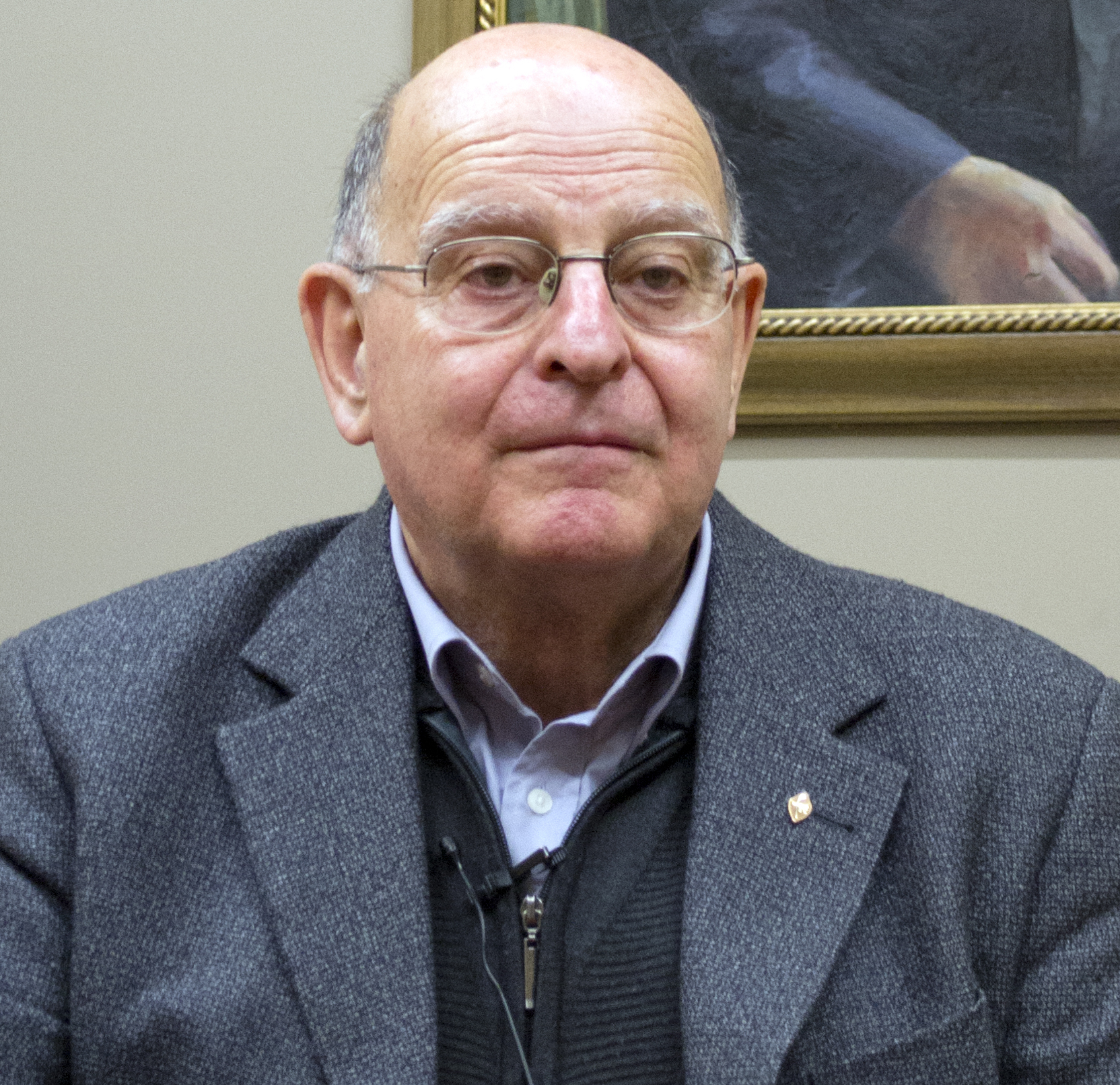
Brother Álvaro Rodríguez Echeverría in 2013

Álvaro Rodríguez Echeverría (born 1942 in San José, Costa Rica) is a Costa Rican religious of the Institute of the Brothers of the Christian Schools or De La Salle Brothers, a Catholic teaching order. He served as its 27th superior general from 2000 to 2014.

== Biography ==
He joined the Central America district of the De La Salle Brothers in 1959 and attended Instituto San Pío X, Salamanca, Ciencias religiosas 1961-1964 and Universidad La Salle de México, Filosofía 1968-1972. He taught and was involved in vocation work from 1964–1981 and held administration roles in the Central American district from 1981 to 1992. In 1992 he was elected Vicar General for the order, based in the motherhouse in Rome. In 2000 he was elected to a seven-year term as Superior General of the Institute and re-elected in 2007 for another seven years, until May 20, 2014. After a sabbatical year, he was appointed Rector of the La Salle University of Costa Rica, a position he currently holds. Over the years he has served as a professor, Director, Auxiliary Visitor, Vice President of the Latin American Lasallian Region and Visitor of the Central American District, Vicar General, Superior General and University President. On August 3, 2018, in San Jose, Costa Rica, before the Lasallian Community, authorities of the Central American and Panama District, representatives of the university and his families, celebrated the 50th Anniversary of his Perpetual Vows.

== See also ==
Catholic Church titles
Preceded by John Johnston	Superior General; De La Salle Brothers; 2000 to 2014	Succeeded by Robert Schieler
