= Religious values =

Beliefs and practices which a religious adherent partakes in

Religious values reflect the beliefs and practices which a religious adherent partakes in. Most values originate from sacred texts of each respective religion. They can also originate from members of the religion.

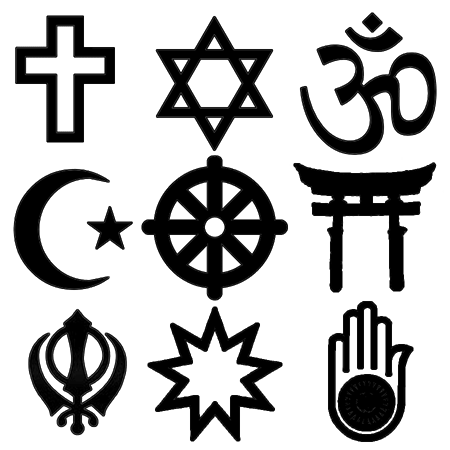
Religious symbols representing multiple religions. From top left to right (Christianity, Judaism, Hinduism, Islam, Buddhism, Shinto, Sikhism, Baha 'i, Jainism)

Members of particular religions are considered to be a prime embodiment of the particular religion's values, such as leaders or adherents of a religion who strictly abide by its rules. Each religion has similar and differing values. Being religious does not indicate that certain religions are opposed to particular attitudes or encourage them. These values are also evident in secular society as it shares similarities.

Various aspects of the significance of religious values have been considered with respect to novels, their relevance to a particular religious group (the Jains for instance or Latin Americans), and in relation to human society.

Religions influence areas of living in society such a how they treat money. Money is used more ethically by religious adherents than those who are not. Care of the environment is also a religious moral based on values of creation. There are issues in society such as abortion which religious values impact as well. An adherent's attitudes on homosexuality are also affected by religious values. If divorce is taken as a path in marriage or not is affected by how religious the individuals are. Even an adherents consumer behaviour can be shaped by their religion.

== Origin ==
Religious values are usually based on values reflected within religious texts or by the influence of the lives of religious persons.

Known as the ‘Indigenous Religious Values Hypothesis’, the origin of religious values can be seen as the product of the values held by the society in which the religion originated from. The beliefs of an individual are often centred around a religion, so the religion can be the origin of that individual's values. When religion is defined heuristically, it can be used by individuals, communities or societies to answer their existential questions with the beliefs that the religion teaches. Values develop from the answers religions give to those existential questions.

== Significance ==
Every individual does not consider religion to affect the actions and thoughts of a person. Though in some communities secularisation is considered dominant, it does not mean that religion is insignificant in those communities.

=== Money shapes religion in one way or another ===
Monetary Intelligence is greater among individuals who have a lower interest in making money but are more religious, along with those who wish to make ethical decisions. In a study by Thomas Tang on monetary intelligence found that making ethical decisions in the study was related to recalling the Ten Commandments, which are a Christian set of ethical teachings from which Christian values are developed. These developed values are uniform across many religions, though not all of them from the Ten Commandments.

=== Environment ===
The Roman Catholic leader, Pope Francis wrote an encyclical called ‘Laudato Sí’. It focused on the environment and it was thought that it would change the attitudes of Roman Catholics. A study by Associated Press-NORC Centre for Public Affairs Research and Yale University researchers, found that 40% of American Catholics were only aware of the encyclical and the encyclical did not produce much of a difference in their reaction to climate change.

=== Abortion ===
A study done by Harris and Mills found that those who associate more with values of self-determination are more likely to agree to abortion than those who associate with values which reflect responsibility for others. Persons who associate with values of self-determination are not as religious as those who identify with values of responsibility for others.

Joseph Tamney and his colleagues conducted a study to create a model representing the reasons why or why not individuals support legalised abortion in the American population. They mention that Judaism and Christianity possess values which limits an individual's freedom. Christianity values the preservation of natural processes and human life. This is why adherents of Christianity oppose abortion.

=== Homosexuality ===
A study investigated the role of religion in how attitudes about homosexuality is shaped in 33 countries. Some countries have liberal policies while others punish homosexuality. They found that nations who value self-expression are more accepting of homosexuality than nations who are focused on survival. Nations which survival values are not tolerant of ideas that are not traditional. Being self-expressive allow more opportunity for personal religious beliefs to be displayed. Muslim nations have harsher punishments for those found guilty of homosexuality. Their attitudes are no different to countries that are Buddhist, Protestant or Orthodox whose penalties are not as harsh. Just living in Muslim countries encourages inhabitants, including those who do not adhere to the religion, to have these attitudes about homosexuality than living in a Catholic country.

=== Divorce ===
Religious values are against divorce unless during a situation of abuse or adultery. Studies show that this is due to the fact that religions benefit from marriage. The value of family is evident in many religions, especially Christianity. Christian teachings, which mainly originate in the Bible, consider divorce to be a sin. This is why marriage is considered to be sacred and in need of preservation.

Religion is considered to promote sustaining marriage and traditional sexual norms. Being religious indicates that marriages are more likely to be stable and be happy. Religious couples are not likely to cheat on their spouses than non-religious, married individuals. Married couples who are religious are less likely to separate or divorce. A study held by Joshua Tuttle and Shannon Davis found that religion decreases the occurrence of infidelity in married couples. They claimed that this was because religions promote traditional sexual and marital norms and discourage extramarital sexual activity. They also found that being religious did not stop marital infidelity from occurring, but it also did not change the chance of divorce. Marital infidelity also does not appear to have an effect of the chance of divorce in long-married couples.

=== Consumer behaviour ===
Religion influences consumer's purchase. Some religions do not allow the consumption of certain foods such as Islam, which does not allow pork and Hinduism which does not allow beef. Those who are adherents of Islam may shop without much thought and research of the product they purchase. Muslims are also more likely to try new brands and new stores as their religious philosophy is that the outcome of their actions are God's will. Hindus are more likely to be rational with their purchases, which follows their religious philosophy. Adherents of Catholicism are more likely to purchase popular products and from well-known brands. Catholics are also likely to research their products and actively search for their desired product. Nittin Essoo and Sally Dibb found in their study that religious consumers were more practical in their shopping than devout shoppers, focusing more on the deals on the price and the credit which is available. They also found that adherents of Catholicism had a more demanding shopping behaviour compared to the shopping behaviour of Hindus and Muslims shoppers. When analysing Hindu behaviours when shopping, Essoo and Dibb described it as fatalism which sided with the religion's beliefs of self-control, calmness, detachment and compassion, which the researchers claimed explained their passive shopping behaviour. The studies result suggested that Hindu consumers were less demanding, less thoughtful of their purchases, they were less traditional, less practical with their purchase and their shopping behaviour was also less innovative compared to Muslim and Catholic shoppers. This meant they were less likely to put effort into purchasing and were more accepting of poor service and high prices.

=== Gender discrimination ===
In Australia, the Sex Discrimination Act does not allow gender discrimination in any organisation except in religious grounds. Due to this, religions are allowed to not allow women to perform certain duties or actions, such as the Catholic Church's refusal to allow women to be ordained as clergy. Woman are not allowed to sit at the front of religious places of worship in some religions. Some religions do not allow the entry of women into places of religious worship.

== Study ==
William Schweiker points out that religion, unlike philosophy, is influenced by the lives of persons significant to a religion, places which are considered important and principles which are unique to a religion, differing one religion from the other. Religious values can be studied with different approaches. Schweiker mentions five of these listed below:

- Formalist approach
  - When a group of values, practices and principles are considered to be part of a ‘Religion’, focusing on the moral implications on an individual's life through this manifestation of qualities is called a formalist approach.
- Sociolinguistic approach
  - Studying the ways in which communities live.
- Ethical naturalism
  - Where propositions of ethics by the world is examined to define general ethical concepts.
- Hermeneutical
  - Looks at the perspective of traditions on any given situation.
- Multidimensional
  - Is similar to a formalist approach, only differing in that it is more perceiving of how knowledge and disciplines were made among the specific labels given by the formalist aspect of this approach.

== Practice in Society ==
=== Law in Countries ===
Saudi Arabia and other countries enforces Islamic law. The public practice of religions other than Islam is illegal, however private practice and religious texts only for personal use are permitted.

=== Pledging at Court ===
In Australia, witnesses and jurors who appear at court are asked to make either an oath or affirmation upon any religious text if they wish and by any god recognised by their religion, if they do identify with one. Court Services Victoria detailed the pledge on their website:

“I swear (or the person taking the oath may promise) by Almighty God (or the person may name a god recognised by his or her religion) that the evidence I shall give will be the truth, the whole truth and nothing but the truth.” (para. 3).

=== Clothing ===
Female adherents of Islam are advised to wear the hijab in public (in-front of anyone they could marry), which is a veil covering their hair. It is compulsory in countries such as Saudi Arabia and Iran.

Some Christians wear a cross as an indicator to their beliefs.

=== Environment ===
The Mosques and Schools in Jordan are nearing 100% powered by renewable energy, using the energy for activities such as lights and heating water.

=== Charity ===
- Caritas Australia is example of a religious affiliated charity, based on Christian values such as justice and equality.
- Shamayim is a Jewish animal welfare organisation, encouraging religious communities to go without meat for at least a year.
- Jewish Initiative for Animals (JIFA) is another animal welfare organisation which focuses on Jewish values to promote ethical eating.

== See also ==
- Religion and environmentalism
- Nature conservation
- Charity (practice)
- Ethics in religion
  - Buddhist ethics
  - Christian ethics
  - Hindu ethics
  - Islamic ethics
  - Jewish ethics
- Morality
