= Jardin Atlantique =

Public park and garden in Paris, France

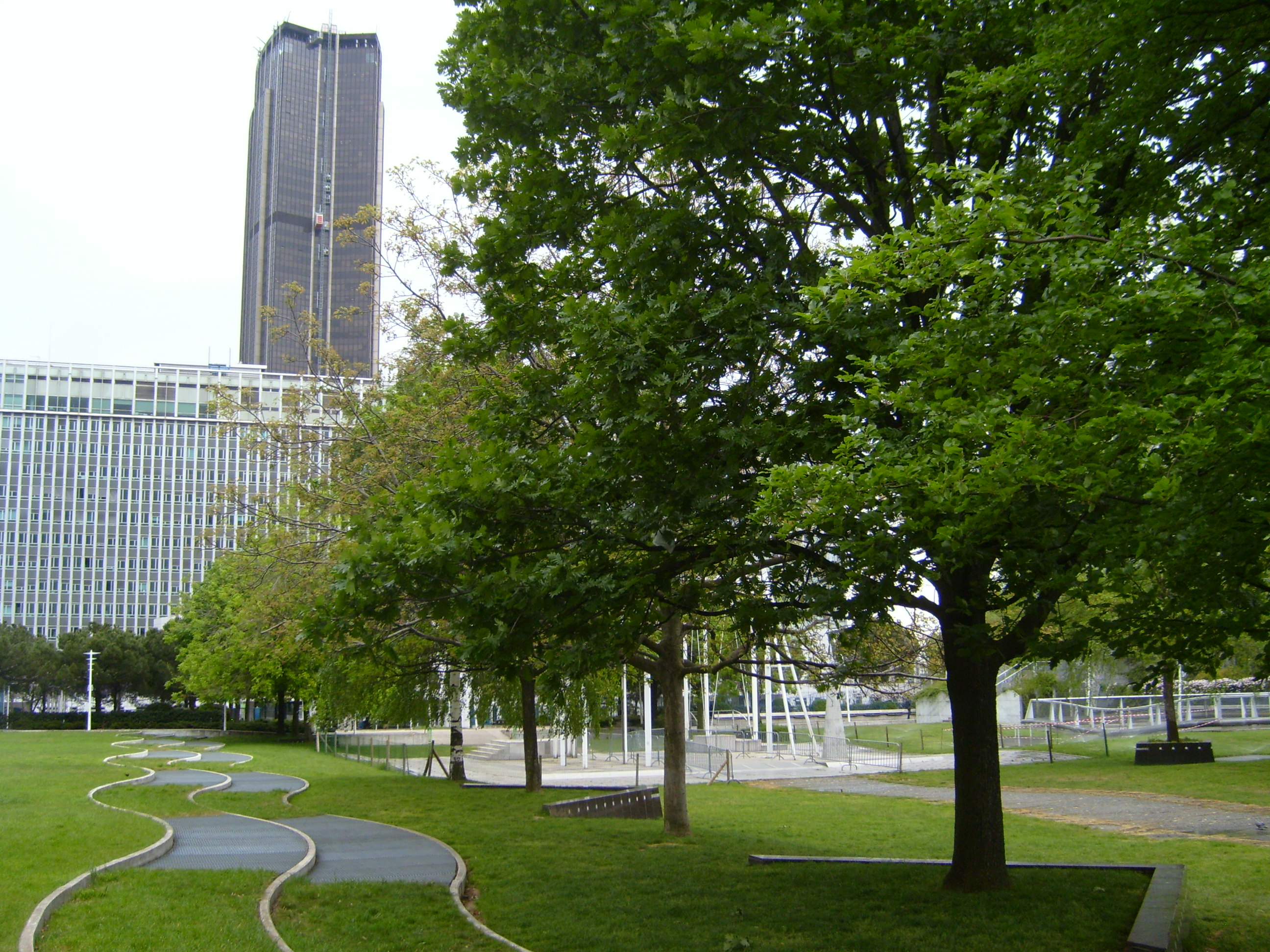
- Jardin Atlantique, located above the tracks of the Gare Montparnasse railway station
- Interactive map of Jardin Atlantique
- Type: Urban garden
- Location: 15th arrondissement, Paris
- Coordinates: 48°50′24″N 2°19′8″E
- Area: 3.4 hectares (8.4 acres)
- Created: 1994
- Status: Open all year
- Public transit: Located near the Gare Montparnasse

The Jardin Atlantique is a public park and garden located in the 15th arrondissement of Paris, on the roof that covers the tracks and platforms of the Gare Montparnasse railway station. It has an area of 3.4 hectares. It was created by the landscape architects Brun, Penna and Schnitzler, and opened in 1994.

== Description ==
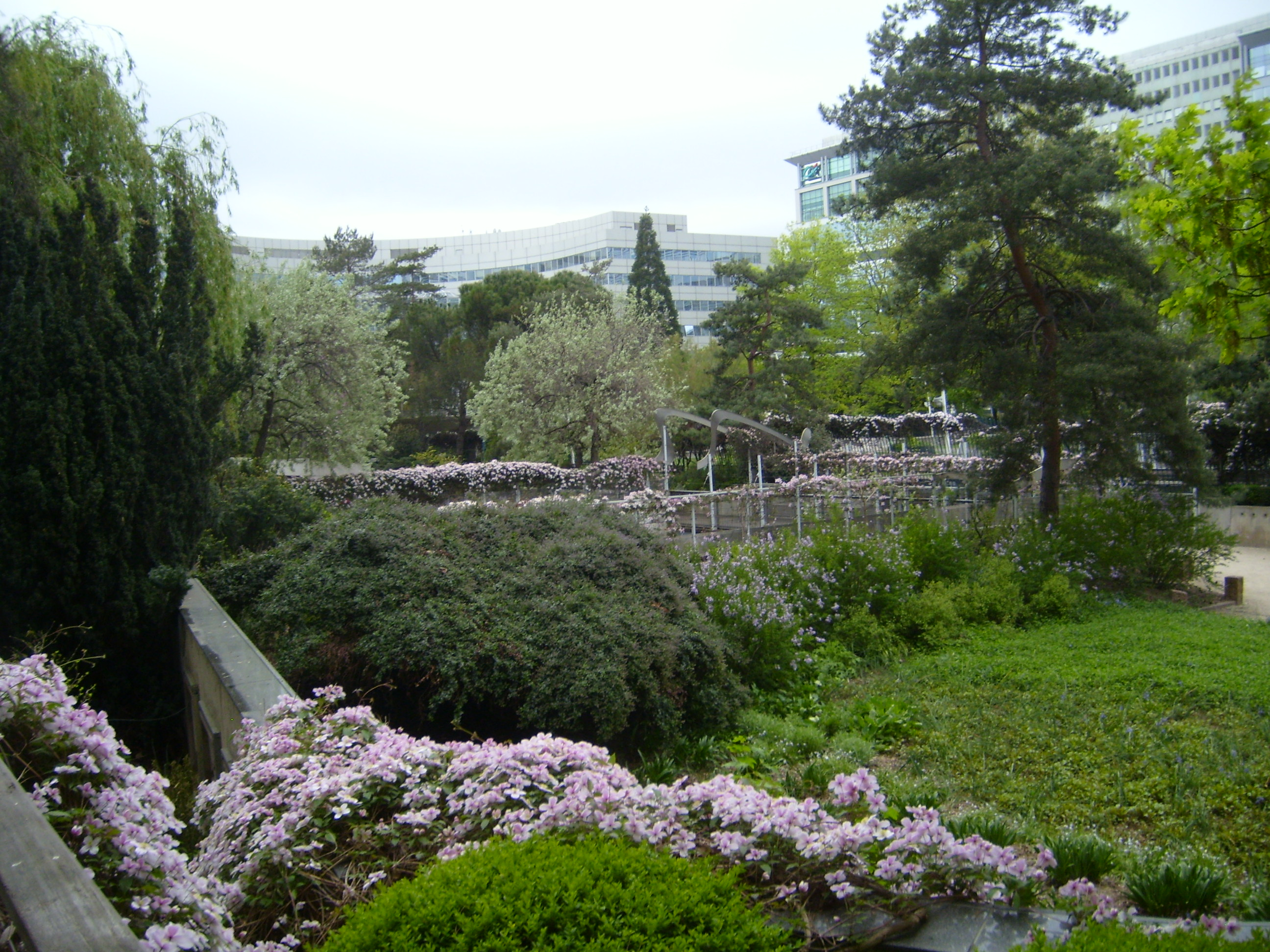
Room of mauve and blue, Jardin Atlantique

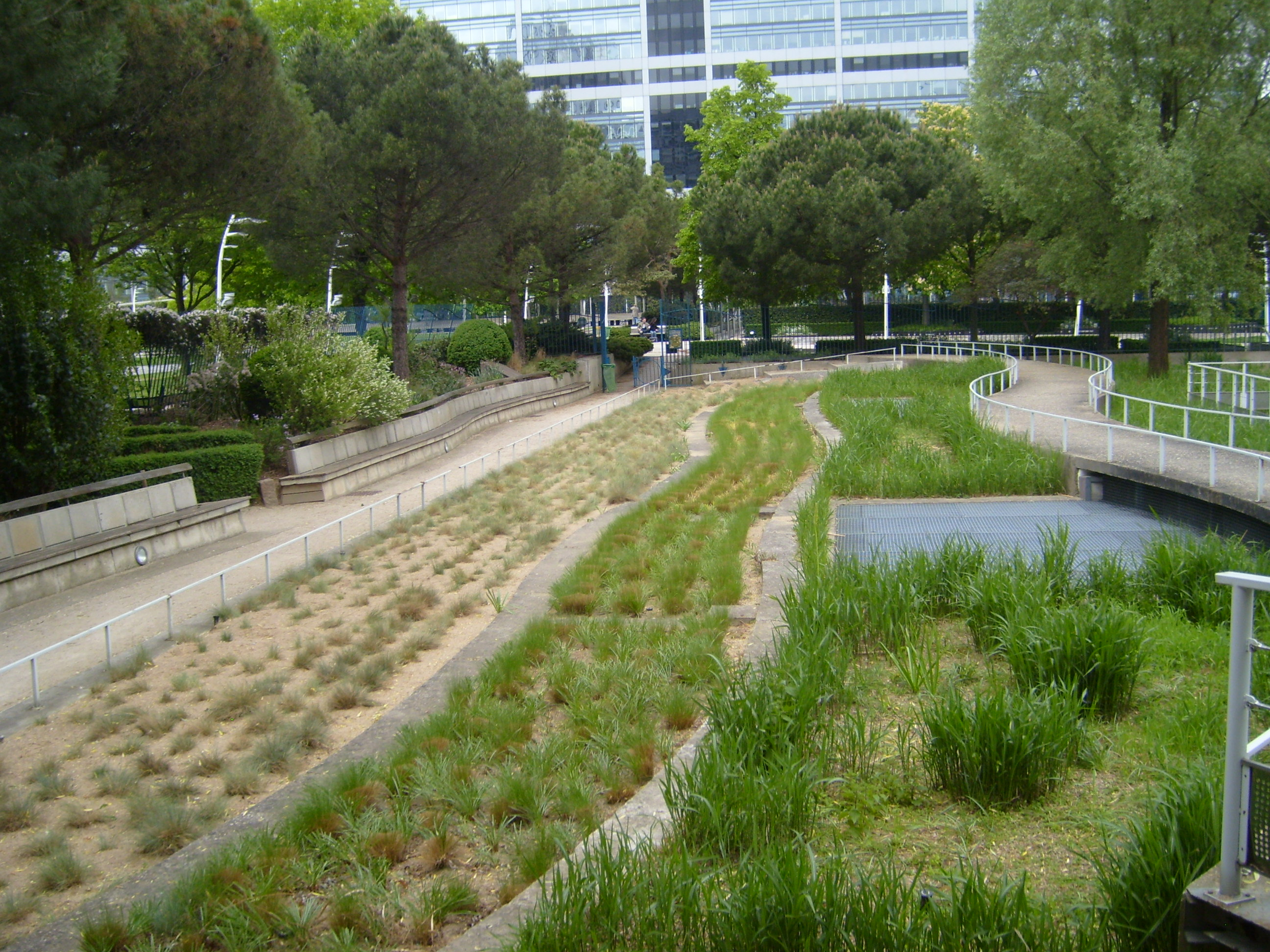
The Room of undulating grasses, Jardin Atlantique

The garden is placed atop the large roof, or dalle, that covers the tracks and platforms of the Gare Monparnasse, supported by twelve pillars, and seventeen meters above the street level. Large ventilator shafts for the station are placed around the garden, and the announcement of the trains departing can be heard in the garden. Cubes of stone filled with earth contain five hundred trees. The garden is surrounded by office buildings and by a line of tennis courts on the west side. It is also the site of a small museum honoring Philippe Leclerc de Hauteclocque, commander of the French armored division which entered Paris first during the liberation of the city from the Germans in August 1944.

The plan of the garden is inspired the historical role of the Gare Montparnasse as the train station that connected Paris to Brittany and the Atlantic Ocean. One theme is that of a ship; the lampposts resemble the masts of sailing ships, and there are two elevated walkways on either side of the garden which resemble the bridges of ships. The visitor to the garden is supposed to feel like a passenger on a cruise ship surrounded by a circle of office buildings.

In the center of the garden, surrounded by a lawn, is a small square called the Isle of the Hesperides, named for the legendary islands believed by the Ancient Greeks to be to the west of the Pillars of Hercules. In the "island" is a fountain, called the Fontaine des Hesperides, made by the sculptor Jean-Max Llorca, composed of several gigantic meteorogical instruments for measuring the rain, temperature, wind, and atmospheric pressure, surrounded by jets of water.

On the east side of the garden are a series of small thematic gardens, with different types of vegetation:

- Salle des Plants ondoyantes. (grasses moving in the wind.)
- Salle des Humidites. (Aquatic plants.)
- Salle des Bleus and Mauves. (Flowers in blue and mauve.)
- Salle du Silence. (A secluded garden for meditation.)
- Salle des Rivages (Plants of the coast.)

The large number of pine trees in the garden are also supposed to evoke the Atlantic coast of Brittany.

The east side of the garden also has two pavillons, where visitors can climb to the roof and look over the garden.

== Bibliography ==
- Jarassé, Dominique, Grammaire des Jardins Parisiennes, Parigramme, 2007. ISBN 978-2-84096-476-6.
