= De La Salle Brothers =

Catholic religious teaching congregation

Institute of the Brothers of the Christian Schools
- Latin: Institutum Fratrum Scholarum Christianarum; French: Frères des Écoles Chrétiennes
- Abbreviation: FSC
- Nickname: Lasallians
- Formation: 1725 (301 years ago)
- Founder: Jean-Baptiste de la Salle
- Founded at: Reims, Kingdom of France
- Type: Lay religious congregation of pontifical right (for men)
- Purpose: Education
- Headquarters: Via Aurelia 476, Rome, Italy
- Region served: Worldwide
- Services: Education
- Members: 2,883 members as of 2023
- Secretary General: Antxon Andueza
- Superior General: Armin A. Luistro
- Vicar General: Carlos Gabriel Gómez Restrepo
- Motto: Latin: Signum Fidei; English: Sign of Faith
- Main organ: Generalate
- Parent organization: Catholic Church
- Website: lasalle.org

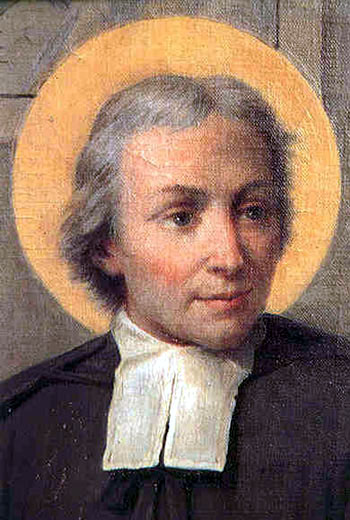
Jean-Baptiste de la Salle, the founder of the De La Salle Brothers

The De La Salle Brothers, officially named the Institute of the Brothers of the Christian Schools (Latin: Fratres Scholarum Christianarum; French: Frères des Écoles Chrétiennes; Catalan: Germans de les Escoles Cristianes; Italian: Fratelli delle Scuole Cristiane) abbreviated FSC, is a Catholic lay religious congregation of pontifical right for men founded in France by Jean-Baptiste de La Salle (1651–1719), now based in Rome, Italy. The De La Salle Brothers are also known as the Christian Brothers (sometimes by Lasallian organisations themselves), French Christian Brothers, or Lasallian Brothers. The Lasallian Christian Brothers are distinct from the Congregation of Christian Brothers, often also referred to as simply the Christian Brothers, or Irish Christian Brothers. The Lasallian Brothers use the post-nominal abbreviation F.S.C. to denote their membership of the order, and the honorific title Brother, abbreviated "Bro."

The Lasallian order stated that as of December 2023 the Institute had 2,883 Brothers, who helped in running 1,154 education centers in 78 countries with 1,160,328 students, together with 107,827 teachers and lay associates. There are La Salle educational institutions in countries ranging from impoverished nations such as Nigeria to post-secondary institutions such as Bethlehem University (Bethlehem, Palestine), Manhattan University (New York City, US), College Mont La Salle (Ain Saadeh, Lebanon), and La Salle University (Philadelphia, Pennsylvania, US). The central administration of the Brothers operates out of the Generalate in Rome and is made up of the Superior General and his councillors.

A number of Lasallian institutions in several countries have been accused of, and have admitted and apologised for, long-standing and serious physical and sexual abuse against their charges.

== History ==
Historical numbers
Year	Pop.	±%
1719	275	—
1792	925	+236.4%
1819	2,325	+151.4%
1874	10,250	+340.9%
1900	14,000	+36.6%
2019	4,000	−71.4%
2021	3,000	−25.0%
2023	2,883	−3.9%

In March 1679, Jean-Baptiste de La Salle met the teacher Adrian Nyel in a chance encounter at the Convent of the Sisters of the Infant Jesus. Nyel asked for La Salle's help in opening free schools for the poor boys in Reims. A novitiate and normal school were established in Paris in 1694. Then the brothers decided collectively to take what is called a "vow of association" that is still performed today. This initial vow required the brothers to stay together and interact with their community, instead of living in separate monasteries or isolated convents such as in the priesthood. La Salle spent his life teaching poor children in parish charity schools. The school flourished and widened in scope; in 1725, six years after La Salle's death, the society was recognised by the pope, under the official title of "Brothers of the Christian Schools". La Salle was canonised as a saint on 15 May 1900. In 1950, Pope Pius XII declared him to be the "Special Patron of All Teachers of Youth in the Catholic Church".

The order, approved by Pope Benedict XIII in 1725, rapidly spread over France. It was dissolved by a decree of the National Assembly set up after the French Revolution in February 1790, but recalled by Napoleon I in 1804 and formally recognised by the French government in 1808. Since then its members penetrated into nearly every country of Europe, Africa, America, Asia and Australia.

== The Order ==
As religious, members take the three usual vows of poverty, chastity, and obedience. The Institute's headquarters is in Rome, Italy. The order has five global regions: North America (Région Lasallienne de l'Amérique du Nord, RELAN), Asia/Oceania (Pacific-Asia Regional Conference, PARC), Europe/Mediterranean (Région Lasallienne Européenne-Méditerranéenne, RELEM), Africa (Région Lasallienne Africano-Malgache, RELAF), and Latin America (Region Latinoamericana Lasallista, RELAL).

During the International Year of Literacy/Schooling (1990), the UNESCO awarded the Noma Literacy Prize to Lasallian Institutions.

The order says that its key principles are faith in the presence of God, concern for the poor and social justice, inclusive community, respect for all people, and quality education.

In 2017 the Institute had 3,800 brothers, 75% fewer than in 1965. The decline is due partly to many brothers reaching retirement age, and the small number of new recruits. In the same period the number of students in Lasallian schools increased from about 700,000 to over a million.

=== Superiors General ===
The following have served as Superior General of the De La Salle Brothers:

- 1717–1720 Br. Barthélemy (Joseph Truffet), FSC
- 1720–1747 Br. Timothée (Guillaume Samson Bazin), FSC
- 1751–1767 Br. Claude (Pierre Nivet), FSC
- 1767–1777 Br. Florence (Jean Boubel), FSC
- 1777–1787 Br. Agathon (Joseph Gonlieu), FSC
- 1795–1810 Br. Fumence (Jean-Baptiste Herbet), FSC
- 1810–1822 Br. Gerbaud (Sébastien Thomas), FSC
- 1822–1830 Br. Guilluame de Jésus (François Marre), FSC
- 1830–1838 Br. Anaclet (Claude Louis Constantin), FSC
- 1838–1874 Br. Philippe (Mathieu Bransiet), FSC
- 1874–1875 Br. Jean-Olympe (Joseph Paget), FSC
- 1875–1884 Br. Irlide (Pierre Jean Cazaneuve), FSC
- 1884–1897 Br. Joseph (Joseph Marie Josserand), FSC
- 1897–1913 Br. Gabriel Marie Joseph (Joseph Marie Josserand), FSC
- 1913–1923 Br. Imier de Jésus (Antoine LaFabrègue), FSC
- 1923–1928 Br. Allais Charles (Jean Petiot), FSC
- 1928–1934 Br. Adrien (Petiot), FSC
- 1934–1940 Br. Junien Victor (Auguste Détharré), FSC
- 1940–1946 Br. Arèse-Casimir, FSC
- 1946–1952 Br. Athanase Émile (Louis-Arthur Ritman), FSC
- 1946–1956 Br. Denis-de-Jésus (Alphonse-Louis de Schepper), FSC - Vicar General
- 1956–1966: Br. Nicet Joseph Loubet, FSC
- 1966–1976: Br. Charles Henry Buttimer, FSC
- 1976–1986: Br. José Pablo Basterrechea, FSC
- 1986–2000: Br. John Johnston, FSC
- 2000–2014: Br. Álvaro Rodríguez Echeverría, FSC
- 2014–2022: Br. Robert Schieler, FSC
- From 2022: Br. Armin Luistro, FSC

== Activities ==
=== Education ===
La Salle initiated a number of innovations in teaching. He recommended dividing up of the children into distinct classes according to their attainments. He also taught pupils to read the vernacular language.

In accordance with their mission statement "to provide a human and Christian education ... especially [to] the poor" the Brothers' principal activity is education, especially of the poor. The Lasallian order stated that as of December 2023 the Institute had 2,883 Brothers, who helped in running 1,154 education centers in 78 countries with 1,160,328 students, together with 107,827 teachers and lay associates.

=== Institutions ===
- The Guadalupana De La Salle Sisters were founded by Br. Juan Fromental Cayroche in the Archdiocese of Mexico. As of 2025, they teach in twelve countries. The motherhouse is in Mexico City.
- The Congregation of the Lasallian Sisters was founded in 1966 by the Brothers of the Christian School in Vietnam to take care of the needs of poor children abandoned because of the civil war there. The office is in Bangkok.
- Lasallian Volunteers were lay people who volunteered for one or two years to engage in teaching and other Lasallian activities. They received room and board and a living stipend. The Lasallian Volunteers program ended on June 30, 2022, after 32 years.

=== Protection of the environment ===
English Lasallian lay brother and missionary Paul McAuley went to Peru in 1995 as part of his ministry in the Brothers of the Christian Schools, and set up a school in a poor shantytown in Lima; after a few years he was honoured with the British award of MBE for his work. He gave the award away and said that he would otherwise have returned it in protest at British companies' activities in the rainforest. In 2000, he founded the La Salle Intercultural Student Community, a hostel for indigenous schoolchildren in Belén, a neighbourhood of the jungle city of Iquitos. He helped tribes in the Amazon rainforest to fight against oil and gas companies expanding into the rainforest; local news media described him as a "Tarzan activist", "white terrorist" and "incendiary gringo priest". In July 2010, the Peruvian government revoked his residency permit for participating in activities "such as protest marches and other acts against the Peruvian state which constitute a breach of public order." He fought the expulsion in Peruvian courts and won his right to stay.

On 2 April 2019, his dead body was discovered in the same hostel he founded in Iquitos; his body had been burned after his death. Peru's episcopal conference praised McAuley and called on the authorities to investigate the crime.

=== Other activities ===
==== Investment services ====
In 1981, the Institute started Christian Brothers Investment Services (CBIS), a "socially responsible investing service" exclusively for Catholic organisations, saying that it "encourage[s] companies to improve policies and practices through active ownership".

==== Winery ====
The Brothers arrived in Martinez, California, US, on the southern edge of the Carquinez Strait, part of the greater San Francisco Bay in 1868. In 1882 they began making wine for their own use at table and as sacramental wine. They also began to distill brandy, beginning with the pot-still production method that is used in the cognac region. Their production expanded until 1920, when prohibition limited their production to wines for sacramental use.

In 1932, at the end of Prohibition, they relocated the winery to the Mont La Salle property in the Napa Valley and continued making wine, in larger quantities. In 1935 Brother Timothy Diener became wine master, and he served in this position for 50 years. In the 1950s they acquired Greystone Cellars near St. Helena, California. Varietal wine was made at the Napa Valley facility, generic wine and brandy were produced at Reedley in the San Joaquin Valley, and barrel ageing was handled at Greystone.

The Christian Brothers winery operated under the corporate name "Mont La Salle Vineyards". In 1988 the winery employed 250 people and produced 900,000 cases of wine, 1.2 million cases of brandy, and 80,000 cases of altar wine. Proceeds from sales helped to fund the Christian Brothers programs and schools, such as Cathedral High School in Los Angeles, and the care of ageing Brothers.

In 1989, the vineyards were sold to Heublein, Inc. The sacramental wine brand was purchased by four former Christian Brothers winery executives who as of 2025 carry on production under the name "Mont La Salle Altar Wines". The Brothers retained the Mont La Salle property and have a retreat located there.

== Controversial incidents ==
=== Child sexual abuse ===
In the Northern Ireland Historical Institutional Abuse Inquiry (HIA), an inquiry into institutional sexual and physical abuse in Northern Ireland institutions that were in charge of children from 1922 to 1995, the De La Salle Brothers admitted in 2014 to the abuse of boys at two institutions: the former De La Salle Boys' Home Rubane House in Kircubbin, County Down, and St Patrick's Training School in west Belfast, and apologised to its victims. The order accepted that one of its earliest overseers engaged in sexual offences. Representing the de la Salle order, Kevin Rooney QC said the brothers recognised that some of their members had caused "immense pain" to children which was "in contradiction to their vocation". Senior Counsel Christine Smith QC said, "...[T]hose homes operated as outdated survivors of a bygone age."

The Inquiry's first public hearings were held from January to May 2014 with the inquiry team reporting to the Executive by the start of 2016. Module 3: De La Salle Boys Home at Rubane House, Kircubbin, started on 29 September 2014 and was completed on 17 December, when the chairman paid tribute to the victims who testified. By October 2014 about 200 former residents of Rubane House made allegations of abuse, and 55 alleged that they themselves were physically or sexually abused. Billy McConville, orphaned when his mother Jean McConville was abducted and shot by the IRA in 1972, waived anonymity and described repeated sexual and physical abuse, and starvation, at Rubane House. During the inquiry counsel for the De La Salle order said compensation had been paid, and accepted that some members had abused young boys at the home, but that the order believed that some claims "did not take place".

Brother Francis Manning FSC said that the order welcomed the inquiry. Before the abuse issue had become public a Brother wrote in a letter to an alleged abuser "It is best forgotten and I have told some brothers that no reference is to be made to it among themselves or the boys. The whole affair is best dropped with the prayer that all will learn that lesson that our holy rule is very wise in its prescriptions". The order conducted dozens of internal interviews in this case, but did not report the matter to police.

On 11 March 2022 statements of apology were made in the Northern Ireland Assembly by ministers from the five main political parties in Northern Ireland and by representatives of six institutions where abuse had taken place, including Br Francis Manning representing the De La Salle Brothers. Several abuse survivors and their family members were critical of the apologies that were made by the institutional representatives.

In the 1960s the deputy headmaster of St Gilbert's approved school (for young minor offenders) run by Brothers from the De La Salle order in Hartlebury, Worcestershire, England, was convicted of six counts of sexually abusing boys at the school. He was subsequently reinstated as a teacher at another school. In 2014, former pupils of the school described "a 30-year campaign of sadistic and degrading abuse" including rapes and beatings. A headmaster, a deputy headmaster, and Brothers were reported to have been among those responsible. Police launched an investigation into allegations of abuse at the school between the 1940s and 1970s after former pupils were interviewed by BBC Hereford and Worcester, and documents intended to be unavailable until 2044 were released under the Freedom of Information Act 2000. In 2017 and 2018 two former staff members were tried for serious sexual offences, assault causing actual bodily harm, and child cruelty. They were acquitted of all charges other than three charges of child cruelty against one of the defendants, on which the jury was unable to reach a verdict. Other, named, abusers were reported to have died.

There were other cases with many victims in countries including Scotland (St Ninian's in Gartmore, Stirlingshire; St Joseph's in Tranent; St Mary's in Bishopbriggs), Australia, and Ireland where "Some 46 alleged abusers are named in these 84 allegations of sex abuse." Serious and detailed allegations about decades-old abuse have been reported in the US, with several lawsuits being settled in favour of victims. After the scandal became widely known, branches of the Order apologised, publicly or to individual victims, for several of these cases. At St William's residential school in Market Weighton, England, between 1970 and 1991 many boys were abused; 200 now-adult men have said they were abused. Abusers including the principal, James Carragher, were imprisoned in 2004 for past sexual abuse at the home. Five victims started High Court action for compensation in 2016. Four of the cases were dismissed in December 2016 The De La Salle order repeated their apologies for and condemnation of the abuse. The De La Salle Brothers also operated the controversial BoysTown school between 1961 and 2001, which is known for having the largest case of child abuse at a single institution in Australia's history. Although only two staff, Brother Francis Brophy and Stephen Anthony Gray, were convicted of child sexual abuse by 2017, the trustees for the De La Salle Brothers had paid almost $27 million in compensation for 219 credible claims of abuse, representing the highest figure against a single church-run institution in Australia.

Investigations and trials continued into 2022 involving a number of other schools and the De La Salle order has only apologised where they have been legally found guilty and not where the allegations haven't been prosecuted. This had brought about a widespread condemnation from former, allegedly abused pupils who lack the evidence to bring about a prosecution.

== See also ==
- List of Lasallian educational institutions
- List of Lasallian saints and beatified people
- Parochial patronage
