= Jean-Baptiste de La Salle =

French priest and Catholic saint (1651–1719)

Saint Jean-Baptiste de La Salle FSC
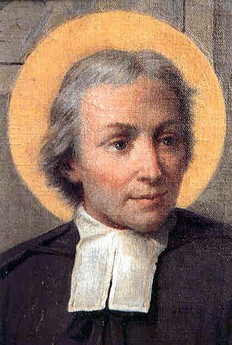

Priest, Religious, Founder, and Confessor
- Born: 30 April 1651; Reims, Champagne, Kingdom of France
- Died: 7 April 1719 (aged 67); Rouen, Normandy, Kingdom of France
- Venerated in: Catholic Church
- Beatified: 19 February 1888, Saint Peter's Basilica by Pope Leo XIII
- Canonized: 24 May 1900, Saint Peter's Basilica by Pope Leo XIII
- Major shrine: Sanctuary of John Baptist de La Salle, Casa Generalizia, Rome, Italy
- Feast: 7 April (Church); 15 May (General Roman Calendar from 1904 to 1969, and Lasallian institutions)
- Attributes: Book, Christian Brothers' habit
- Patronage: Teachers of Youth, (15 May 1950, Pius XII); Institute of the Brothers of the Christian Schools; Lasallian Educational Institutions; Educators; School principals Teachers

Icon of St. John-Baptiste de La Salle by Brother William Woeger.

Jean-Baptiste de La Salle (pronounced [ʒɑ̃ batist də la sal]; English: John Baptist de La Salle /ləˈsæl/; 30 April 1651 – 7 April 1719) was a French priest, educational reformer, and founder of the Institute of the Brothers of the Christian Schools. He is a saint of the Catholic Church and the patron saint for teachers of youth.

La Salle dedicated much of his life to the education of poor children in France; in doing so, he started many lasting educational practices.

== Background ==
La Salle was born to a wealthy family in Reims, France, on 30 April 1651. He was the eldest child of Louis de La Salle and Nicolle Moet de Brouillet. Nicolle's family was a noble one and operated a successful winery business; she was a relative of Claude Moët, founder of Moët & Chandon.

La Salle was tonsured at age eleven on 11 March 1662, in an official ceremony that marked a boy's intention, and his parents offer of their young sons, to the service of God. He was named canon of Reims Cathedral when he was sixteen, and at seventeen received minor orders. He was sent to the College des Bons Enfants, where he pursued higher studies and on 10 July 1669 he took the degree of Master of Arts. When De La Salle had completed his classical, literary, and philosophical courses, he was sent to Paris to enter the Seminary of Saint-Sulpice on 18 October 1670. His mother died on 19 July 1671 and his father on 9 April 1672. This circumstance obliged him to leave Saint-Sulpice on 19 April 1672. He was now twenty-one, the head of the family, and as such had the responsibility of educating his four brothers and two sisters. In 1672 he received the minor order of subdeacon, was ordained a deacon in 1676, and then finally completed his theological studies and was ordained to the priesthood at the age of 26 on 9 April 1678. Two years later he received a doctorate in theology.

== Sisters of the Child Jesus ==
The Sisters of the Child Jesus were a new religious congregation whose work was the care of the sick and education of poor girls. The young priest helped them become established and then served as their chaplain and confessor. It was through his work with the Sisters that in 1679 he met the schoolmaster Adrian Nyel. With De La Salle's help, a school was soon opened. Shortly thereafter, a wealthy woman in Reims told Nyel that she also would endow a school, but only if La Salle would help. What began as an effort to help Adrian Nyel establish a school for the poor in La Salle's home town gradually became his life's work.

== Institute of the Brothers of the Christian Schools ==
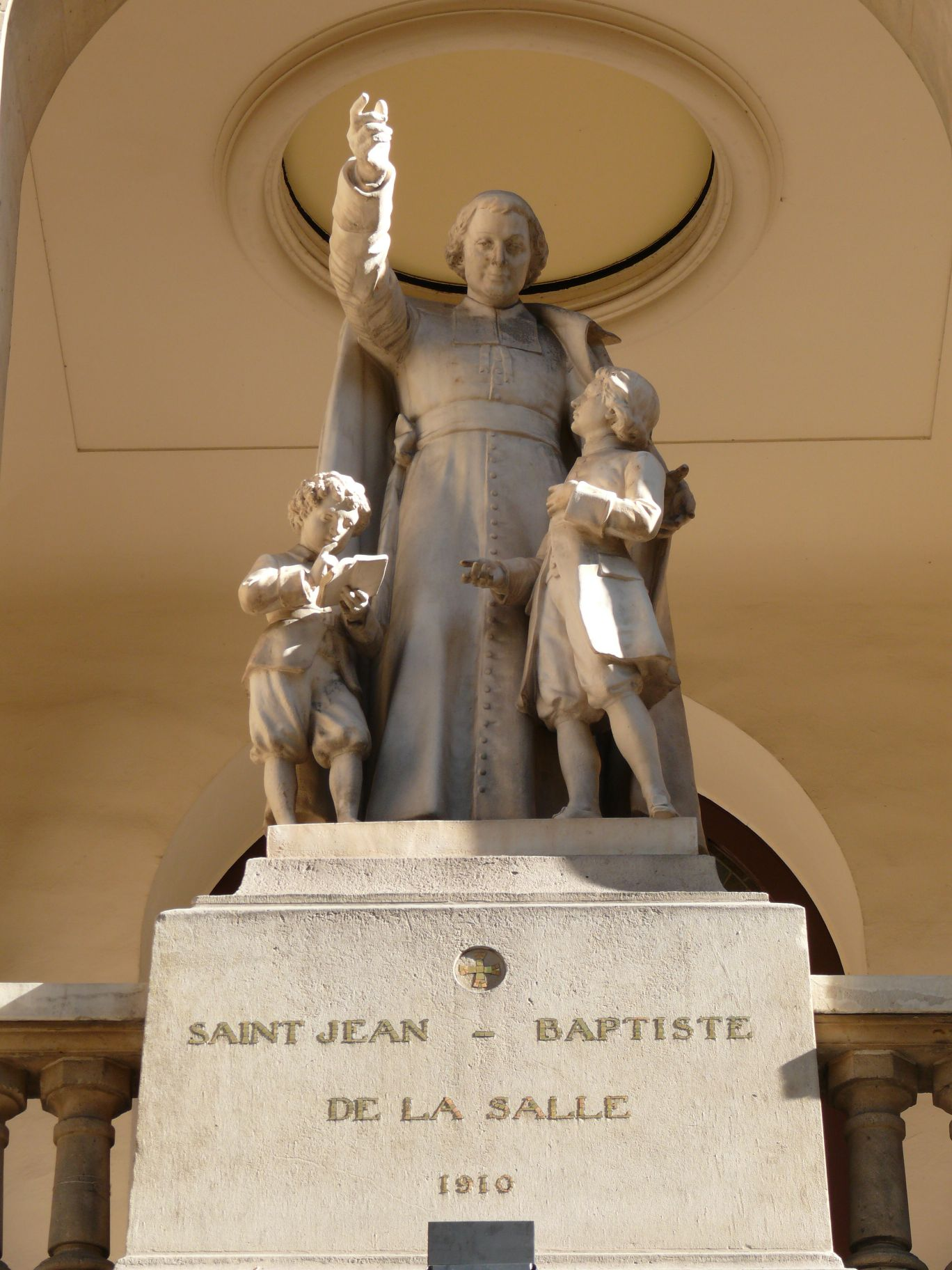
Statue in the Church of Saint Jean-Baptiste de La Salle, Paris, France

At that time, most children had little hope for social and economic advancement. Moved by the plight of the poor who seemed so "far from salvation" either in this world or the next, he determined to put his own talents and advanced education at the service of the children "often left to themselves and badly brought up".

La Salle knew that the teachers in Reims were struggling, lacking leadership, purpose, and training, and he found himself taking increasingly deliberate steps to help this small group of men with their work. First, in 1680, he invited them to take their meals in his home, as much to teach them table manners as to inspire and instruct them in their work. This crossing of social boundaries was one that his relatives found difficult to bear. In 1681, De La Salle decided that he would take a further step and so he brought the teachers into his own home to live with him. De La Salle's relatives were deeply disturbed; his social peers were scandalized. A year later, when his family home was lost at auction because of a family lawsuit, De La Salle rented a house into which he and the handful of teachers moved.

La Salle decided to resign his canonry to devote his full attention to the establishment of schools and training of teachers. The priesthood primarily required him to focus on the sacraments and he needed to give full devotion to education, even in his free time to connect with students. He had inherited a considerable fortune, which he could have been used to further his aims, but on the advice of a Father Barre of Paris, he sold what he had and sent the money to the poor of the province of Champagne, where a famine was causing great hardship.

La Salle thereby began a new religious institute, the first one with no priests whatsoever among its members: the Institute of the Brothers of the Christian Schools, also known as De La Salle Brothers in Europe, Australasia, and Asia, and the Christian Brothers in the United States.

One decision led to another, and La Salle found himself doing something he had never anticipated. La Salle wrote:

I had imagined that the care which I assumed of the schools and the masters would amount only to a marginal involvement committing me to no more than providing for the subsistence of the masters and assuring that they acquitted themselves of their tasks with piety and devotion ... Indeed, if I had ever thought that the care I was taking of the schoolmasters out of pure charity would ever have made it my duty to live with them, I would have dropped the whole project. ... God, who guides all things with wisdom and serenity, whose way it is not to force the inclinations of persons, willed to commit me entirely to the development of the schools. He did this in an imperceptible way and over a long period of time so that one commitment led to another in a way that I did not foresee in the beginning.

La Salle's enterprise met with opposition from ecclesiastical authorities who resisted the creation of a new form of religious life, a community of consecrated laymen to conduct free schools "together and by association". The educational establishment resented his innovative methods. Nevertheless, La Salle and his small group of free teachers set up the institute of the Brothers of the Christian Schools which is, according to the La Salle website, entirely dedicated to the Christian education of the "children of artisans and the poor", in a life close to that of the Catholic religious.

In 1685 La Salle founded what is generally considered the first normal school, a school whose purpose is to train teachers, in Reims.

Worn out by austerity and exhausting labour, La Salle died at Saint Yon, near Rouen, on Good Friday 1719.

== Veneration ==
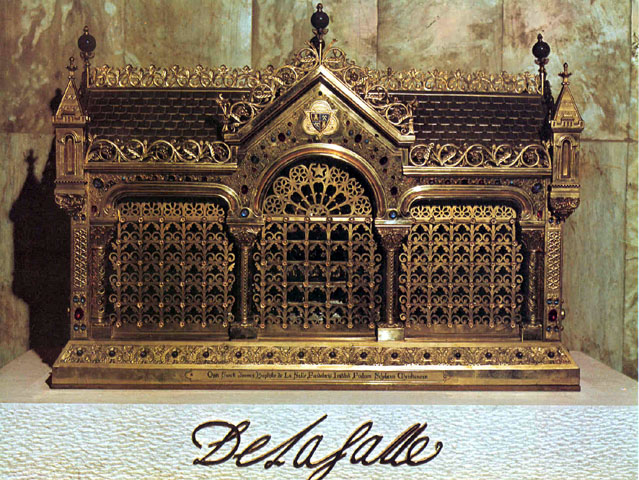
Relics of Jean-Baptiste de La Salle in the Casa Generaliza in Rome, Italy

Pope Leo XIII canonized La Salle on 24 May 1900 and Pope Pius X inserted his feast in the General Roman Calendar in 1904 for celebration on 15 May. Because of his life and inspirational writings, Pope Pius XII proclaimed him Patron Saint of All Teachers of Youth on 15 May 1950. In the 1969 revision of the Church calendar, Pope Paul VI moved his feast day to 7 April, the day of his death or "birth to heaven", his dies natalis.

== Legacy ==
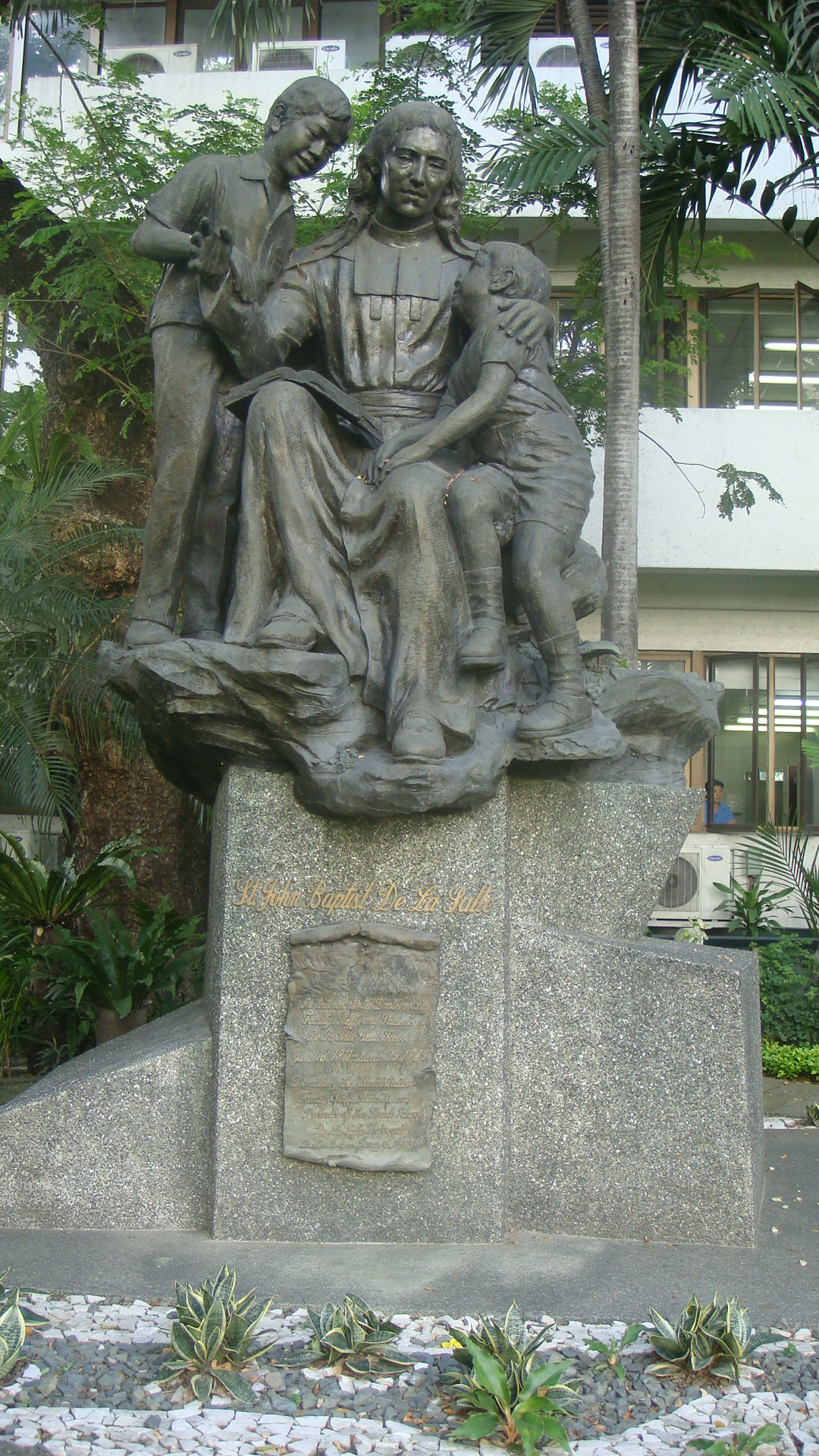
Statue of Jean-Baptiste de La Salle, De La Salle University, Philippines

La Salle was a pioneer in programs for training lay teachers. He was one of the first to teach in native French and not Latin. Of his writings on education, Matthew Arnold remarked: "Later works on the same subject have little improved the precepts, while they entirely lack the unction." His educational innovations include Sunday courses for working young men, one of the first institutions in France for the care of delinquents, technical schools, and secondary schools for modern languages, arts, and sciences. La Salle University says that his writings influenced educational practice, school management, and teacher preparation for more than 300 years.

The Lasallian schools form a 300-year-old network following La Salle's principles. Many schools are named after La Salle, and several streets, often near a Lasallian School, are named after him.

In 2021 the International Lasallian Mission website stated that the Lasallian order consists of about 3,000 Brothers, who help in running over 1,100 education centers in over 80 countries with more than a million students, together with at least 90,000 teachers and lay associates.

Asteroid 3002 Delasalle was discovered in 1982 and was named after De La Salle.

== See also ==
- Institute of the Brothers of the Christian Schools
- Saint Jean-Baptiste de La Salle, patron saint archive
