= St. Paul's Institution =

- Institusi St. Paul

Location
- Jalan Tan Sri Manickavasagam; Seremban, Negeri Sembilan; Malaysia
- 2.7289°N 101.9326°E

Information
- Type: All-boys primary and secondary school
- Motto: Latin: Virtute et labore (Virtue and labour)
- Religious affiliation: Christian
- Denomination: Roman Catholic Church
- Established: 1899
- Founder: Rev. Fr. Catesson, MEP
- Category: Government Aid-School
- Principal: Ng Ai Ching
- Grades: Standard 1 - 6 Form 1 - 5 Form 6 (before 2022)
- Gender: Male; Co-educational (Form 6)
- Campus: Large school campus
- Houses: Director, John, Edward, Adrian, Paul and Barnitus
- Colours: Green and white
- Nickname: St Paul
- Feeder schools: SK St. Paul, Seremban
- Affiliations: Malaysia Ministry Of Education
- Abbreviation: SPI Secondary
- Website: www.stpaulseremban.org

Saint Paul's Institution (Malay: Institusi Saint Paul; abbreviated SPI) is an all-boys (and girls for form 6) and one of the oldest schools in Seremban and also in the country. The school is widely known as SPI and the students of St Paul's Institution are called Paulians.

The school is named after Saint Paul.

SPI Secondary was founded in 1899 by Father Catesson of the Paris Foreign Missions Society in Seremban, Negeri Sembilan, Malaysia. Its aim was to provide an English education to "The boys of Seremban and its outstations".

St Paul's School, as it was then called, was the first English school in Negeri Sembilan. It was declared open on 18 June 1899 by Sir Charles Mitchell, the Governor of the Straits Settlements cum ex-officio British High Commissioner for the Federated Malay States, assisted by the acting British Resident for Negeri Sembilan, Sir E.W. Birch. There was an initial enrolment of 25 students, accommodated in a provisional building under pro tem headmaster, P.V. Coelho.

It was later taken over by the La Sallian Brothers, which saw its student enrolment rise and new buildings being erected over the years.

== History ==
=== La Sallian Brothers takeover ===
The La Sallian Brothers initial foothold in the region had been in Singapore and then Penang. Their good work there did not go unnoticed among the education authorities.

As early as 1904, Rev Bro Gabriel, Visitor of the Christian Brothers' Schools, had been asked if the Order would take over St. Paul's Institution. But demand for the Brothers was heavy - 1904 saw the establishment of St. John's Institution, Kuala Lumpur (SJI) - and there was no immediate response.

In Seremban, all was not well. Coelho was an excellent headmaster, but he was encountering great difficulty finding good teachers. Both the Mission and R.J. Wilkinson, the Federal Inspector of schools, saw the Brothers as the solution to St. Paul's Institution's woes.

Still, it was not till 1 April 1909 that urgent requests by the bishop of Malacca and director of education finally bore fruit. Rev Bro Gilbert, director of SJI, arrived in Seremban to take over St. Paul's Institution's on behalf of his order.

The school's rapid growth soon proved that long - distance supervision from Kuala Lumpur was not practical. On-the-spot management would be necessary, so Rev Bro Isidore-Albert was appointed director. His tenure was short, for after about four-and-half months he was called to his reward.

=== From the First World War to the outbreak of the Second ===
In the years following 1914, when Rev. Bro. Adrian Edmund replaced Rev. Bro. Basilian, St. Paul's grew under a succession of directors. The acquisition of neighbouring buildings relieved the congestion in the original blocks, which were now reserved for residential purposes, offices and a library.

Rev. Bro. Lewis Edward raised a temporary hall, made of wood, for concerts, assemblies and badminton. Bro Edward was a great sportsman - the St. Paul's Athletic Association (SPAA) won the premier state football trophy, the Hose Cup, for three consecutive seasons. A permanent school hall was built during the Directorship of Bro. Joseph Brophy. He also purchased a large bungalow from Towkay Siow Kon Chia and a large shophouse in Jalan Tuan Sheikh for conversion into additional classrooms.

Bro. Joseph's improvements, coming on earlier architectural initiatives by Rev. Bro. Barnitus Kennedy (1930–31) and Rev. Bro. John Lynam (1931–33), shaped the school quadrangle into a fine set of modern buildings as the 1930s wore on. A small playing field was devised by removing some old buildings, although the need for a proper-sized field was still felt.

The improving facilities were matched by a rising enrolment, which reached 550 in the 1920s. Many pupils were boarders-boys from outside Seremban who stayed in the school itself. To cater for the waxing student population, the number of teaching staff - especially Lay Masters - rose proportionally. By 1933 there were more than 550 students - at which plateau student numbers stabilised till after the War.

=== The Japanese Occupation ===
By 1941, war was raging in Europe and drawing closer to Malaya by the day. St. Paul's was under military occupation, and Rev. Bro. Henry (1941–46) had to improvise classrooms in borrowed buildings. Rev. Mother St. Pauline also placed the I J Convent Hall and some classrooms at his disposal.

Then came the invasion. On 13 January 1942, Japanese troops took Seremban - but the Brothers did not flee. Some endured the ignominy of detention; young Bro. Christian Lane died of Cerebral Malaria at the Bahau jungle community. Others were pillars of strength for their fellow inmates - Changi Prison internees so valued Bro. Sylvester's selflessness they presented him with a signed testimonial.

For a brief spell (May - September 1942), St. Paul's reopened as a private school with 165 students. It served out the rest of the War as a Japanese Technical School, with a staff drawn from several schools in the area. Bro. Henry remained as Headmaster until January 1944, when a Japanese national relieved him of the post.

=== Post-war expansion and the splitting of St. Paul's ===
St. Paul's rehabilitation was rapid and enrolment began to skyrocket, straining resources. Rev. Bro. Lawrence Henry (1947–53) did what he could to stem the tide, but by 1950 St. Paul's had 1,000 students and was bursting at the seams. A separate secondary school was urgently needed and the Brothers began to plan for one.

It was Rev. Bro. Casimir L'Angellier (1954–59) who was in charge during these years. A site in the Lobak area, renamed Mont La Salle, was gifted by the Government and plans were drawn up for a secondary school that would accommodate 700 students.

With the third school term of 1958, the old buildings beside the N.S. Padang were those of the primary school, with Walter de Silva as Headmaster of St. Paul's Institution Primary (SPI Primary).

The new secondary school, St. Paul's Institution Secondary (SPI Secondary) were opened by Almarhum DYMM Tuanku Munawir ibni Almarhum Tuanku Abdul Rahman on 27 June 1959.

A combined Board of Governors (BoG) was set up on 3 October 1958 under Dato' T. Mahima Singh (but was split again in 1962). In 2011, SPI Primary BoG is chaired by Old Paulian and former Dewan Negara president Tan Sri Dato' Chan Choong Tak and SPI Secondary BoG is chaired by Old Paulian Dr. Bob Devadass Samuel.

=== Events through the 1960s and 1970s, and further expansion ===
The schools sporting prowess was demonstrated when the hockey squad bred the country's first four national goalkeepers, namely Benny Manuel, Peter Van Huizen, Ho Koh Chye, Tan Foong Luen and Michael Yan Wai Ping.

In the time of Rev. Bro. J. Felix Donahue (1970–75), two major developments took place and the seeds of a third were sown. First came the establishment of CoEd Sixth Form Science Classes in 1970; together with arrival of the first female Paulians. The Old Boys Association had to change its name, as the long tradition of an exclusively-male student body ended.

The school's 1973 High School Certificate results placed it first in the state and in 1975 SPI Secondary's HSC high-flyers outscored every other school in Malaysia.

By 1975 the secondary school's enrolment stood at 1,300 and once more space was scarce. A new block with three science laboratories, 12 classrooms and a canteen was envisioned, with a price tag of $400,000.

The Ministry of Education got the ball rolling with a $50,000 grant - with the rest to come from St. Paul's own efforts. Fundraising began in earnest under Rev. Bro. James Macken (1975–91), and the run of Walkathons, Public Shows and even a SPILAB Lottery brought in the required $350,000.

On 23 September 1977, the Yang di-Pertuan Besar DYMM Tuanku Jaafar ibni Almarhum Tuanku Abdul Rahman declared open the new extension. By this time, the increasing student numbers were coinciding with another more worrying trend - decline in the ranks of the Brothers. Only Rev. Bro. James and Rev. Bro. Augustine Arokiasamy remained on the secondary school teaching staff. (Rev. Bro. Michael Kum also served at SPI Secondary, from 1986 to 1989.)

There were no Brothers left at all in the primary school, which in October 1979 moved house to a new site in the Labu area. This had been developed by a private company (Foo Kam Swee Construction), then signed over to the Brothers in exchange for the original Paul Street premises. The old brood of buildings, lovingly added to and improved by so many Brother Directors and their lay successors, were bulldozed down to make way for a shopping complex to be known as Wisma Punca Emas which still stands until today.

=== The Jamesian Decade and the end of an era ===
No La Salle Brother served longer as director of SPI Secondary's than Rev. Bro. James, and few emphasised tradition more than him. Nor did the Paulians of the 1980s let him or their predecessors down. In 1986, SPI Secondary's STPM results again put it in the national Top Three. Under the tutelage of Lawrence van Huizen, William Fidelis & Ashwin Patel, the hockey players harvested yet more State titles and contributed additional players to the National team.

In 1991 Rev. Bro. James Macken, for 16 years director of St. Paul's, retired, passing the baton to the first non-Brother Director; Kenneth Kulasingam. With the transfer of Rev. Bro. Michael Kum to St. Francis' Institution in Malacca, no Christian Brother now taught in St. Paul's.

A line stretching back 82 years to Rev. Bro. Isidore had now come to an end.

=== Into the Present ===
SPI Secondary celebrated its 100th year in 1999. To mark the occasion, a time capsule was planted in the assembly ground by DYYM Tunku Putra Nadzaruddin Tunku Jaafar.

In 2006, SPI Secondary welcomed the first lady principal with the appointment of Mdm. Yap See Moi.

In 2007, a double-storey school hall, providing students with better facilities for both studying and co-curricular activities was built. Consisting of four new classrooms, four badminton courts and a gymnasium, the hall was opened by YB Dato’ Hon Choon Kim, Deputy Minister of Education, Malaysia. A few months later, the school created a multi-purpose court specified for games like hockey, futsal, tennis etc. The students have the opportunity to use the court as training ground for future competitions.

Starting in 2008, the school has begun a project to raise funds to refurnish the computer lab.

In 2009, a new computer lab and renovations to the school toilets were completed. SPI Secondary celebrated 100 years as a La Sallian school and organised a variety of activities which was well covered by the local media like The Star. The historic occasion was also celebrated by its former students and alumni, Old Paulians' Association (OPA) at OPA 83rd Annual Reunion Dinner 2009, held in Hotel Royale Bintang Resort and Spa Seremban. The event was attended by approximately 1,200 Paulians, well wishers and guests including SPI Primary headmaster Chen Ah Keng.

== Paulian Community ==
Students of SMK St. Paul or SPI Secondary are generally referred as Paulians while their younger brethren at SK. St. Paul or SPI Primary are referred as Young Paulians. Former students and members of its alumni, Old Paulians' Association or OPA, are referred as Old Paulians. The roll of registered Old Paulians is published online by the alumni. By default, the suffix CXXU denote "Graduating Class of" and "Year". For example, "Name of Old Paulian (C90U)" denotes this Old Paulian graduated Form Six Upper from SPI Secondary in 1990. "Name of Old Paulian (C90)" denotes this Old Paulian graduated from SPI Secondary in 1990. It is accepted the absence of "U" generally mean the Old Paulian graduated Form Five from SPI Secondary.

The Paulian community is currently looked after by its alumni association with strong ties to both SPI Primary and SPI Secondary.

The alumni provides monetary assistance to help alleviate the school's financial stress and rewards excellence in sports and academic results with its Tan Sri Chan Choong Tak Award during its OPA Annual Reunion Dinners.

Thanks to Old Paulians and well wishers, OPA is co-ordinating the Brother Felix Donohue Student Welfare Fund to provide financial relief to under privileged Paulians. The fund started in 2010.

Paulians and Young Paulians also benefit from coaching session under the auspices of OPA Sports Assistance Program, currently in sports like hockey and badminton. Qualified coaches, who are also Old Paulians, serve the program voluntarily.

== Brother Directors ==
- Bro. Gandhi Thangarajoo (16 May to 28 August 1909)

He was born in France but was of ethnic Indian descent. In 1909, he was appointed as the first Bro. Director of this school. He died on 6 September 1909 in Seremban.

- Bro. Basilian (26 December 1909 to 28 March 1914)

A French Bro. Director. He also extended the old school. He died in Vietnam on 9 July 1945.

- Bro. Adrian Edmund (29 March 1914 to 27 April 1921)

He was born in England. In 1921, he was transferred to Taiping. He died on 5 August 1925 at the age of 54.

- Bro. Lewis Edward (28 April 1921 to January 1928)

An Irish Bro. Director who later founded the St. Paul's Athletic Association which subsequently Became St. Paul's Old Boys Association. Today, it is known as the Old Paulians' Association. He made St. Paul's Institution a force to be reckoned with in the field of soccer and athletics. He also improved the academic results.

- Bro. Dominic John (June 1928 to January 1939)

An Irish Bro. Director who will always be remembered for establishing the St. Paul's Debating Society. He died on 30 November 1966.

- Bro. Barnitus Kennedy (17 January to 12 August 1931)

He was born in Ireland. He was a pioneer responsible for the successful implementation of the annual Medical Inspection of the pupils. In 1945, he was appointed as the Bro. Visitor. In 1965, he died in Penang.

- Bro. John Lynam (12 August 1931 to 30 June 1933)

An Irish Bro. Director who faced great hardship during the World Recession. He was later transferred to Manila as a Bro. Director and later transferred again to Hong Kong as the Bro. Director of St. Joseph's Hong Kong. He died at the age of 78.

- Bro. Joseph Brophy (2 July 1933 to 4 September 1939)

An Irish Bro. Director. His greatest contributions were the building of the school hall and the upgrading of the school field. Later, he left for Singapore as a Bro. Director.

- Bro. Anselm Conde (4 September 1939 to 11 January 1941)

He was born in France. A renowned Geography teacher who later became the sub-Director of the school from 1943 to 1965. He died in Penang on 5 May 1969.

- Bro. Henry (11 January 1941 to December 1946)

Born in France in 1886. Bro. Henry devoted 45 years as a member of the La Salle Brothers. He is most well- known for refusing to take down the name "St. Paul's Institution" personally during World War II. He died in Pulau Tikus, Penang on 17 July 1959 at the age of 73.

- Bro. Lawrence Henry (3 February 1947 to 9 January 1953)

He was the first Malaysian Bro. Director (of ethnic Indian descent) who helped to rebuild the school after World War II and died 21 years later in 1974.

- Bro. Chronan Austin (January to December 1953)

An Anglo-Burmese Bro. Director of Irish Catholic ancestry who had previously served in St. Paul's Institution as a teacher from January 1939 to January 1940 and again from October 1942 to October 1945, only to return as its director.

- Bro. Casimir L'Angellier (January 1954 to December 1959)

Born in Singapore of Eurasian ancestry and of French descent, he became the school's Sub-Director from January 1942 to December 1944. He was the man behind the construction of the new school in Mont La Salle. Under him, the school celebrated her Golden Jubilee and on the same year we celebrated the Golden Jubilee of the arrival of the Brothers to Seremban. He received his PJK in 1957 and later died in Hong Kong in 1977.

- Bro. Celestine Jennings (January 1960 to December 1963)

He was born in Australia. His efforts to extend the New St. Paul's Institution to the AVA room bore fruit. He died on 1 August 1991 in Southport, Queensland.

- Bro. Thomas Dunne (January 1964 to December 1969)

An Irish Bro. Director who was a teacher of the school in 1940. His greatest contributions were renovating the school hall and starting the afternoon session. Under his tenure of office, collections for the poor was healed. He was later transferred to St. Xavier's Institution, Penang.

- Bro. Felix Donahue (1 January 1970 to 12 February 1975)

He was born in Ireland. For the first time in history, girls were enrolled in Form IV and in Form VI. The renovation of the school office and the school Reference Library was carried out. He was honoured with the PJK award in 1973. In 1975, he was transferred to La Salle PJ as Bro. Director.

- Bro. James Macken (13 February 1975 to 28 February 1991)

An Irish Brother who was transferred to St. Paul's Institution from St. Xavier's Institution, Penang as the school's Sub-Director. In 1975, he succeeded Bro. Felix Donahue. He is the longest serving Bro. Director of the school. He was a director of the National College in Kota Kinabalu, Sabah.

== SPI Secondary Principals (Post-brothers period) ==
- 1992 – 1995: Mr. Kenneth Kulasingham (Alumnus, class of 1957)
- 1995 – 1998: Mr. Toh Kim Huat (Alumnus, class of 1960)
- 1998 – 2004: Mr. Hilary Santa Maria (Alumnus, class of 1965)
- 2004 – 2006: Mr. Yap Ooi Beng (Alumnus, class of 1967)
- 2006 – 2011: Mdm. Yap See Moi
- 2011 – 2016: Ms. Lucy Margaret Ratnam
- 2017 – 2022: Mr. Lee Boon Seng
- 2022 – 2024: Mr. Kalaiselvam Muniandi
- 2025 – Now : Ms. Ng Ai Ching

== Notable Paulians (Lasallians) ==
Haji Zainal Abidin bin Ahmad

- First Malaysian to be awarded an Honorary Doctorate of Letters

YAM Tunku Nadzaruddin Ibni Tuanku Jaafar (SPI Primary)

- A royal Paulian, youngest son of Almarhum Tuanku Jaafar ibni Almarhum Tuanku Abdul Rahman

Tan Sri Bahaman bin Samsudin

- Minister of Health, First Cabinet of Malaysia

Dato' Dr. Sheikh Muszaphar Shukor (SPI Primary)

- First Malaysian in space

S. Rajaratnam

- First Foreign Minister of Singapore

Dr. S. Seevaratnam

- Member of Parliament
- DAP Founder National Treasurer
- Founding Chairman for DAP Seremban branch, the first DAP branch in the country

Chin See Yin

- Former Chairman of MCA Negeri Sembilan

Dato’ Lee Boon Peng

- Former Chairman of MCA Negeri Sembilan

Dato’ Mahima Singh

- First MIC Member of Parliament in Port Dickson

Dr. Chen Man Hin

- First Chairman of DAP
- DAP Lifetime Advisor

Dato’ Dr. S. Vijayaratnam

- Cabinet Parliamentary Secretary in the Ministry of Primary Industries, Malaysia

Tan Sri Dato’ Chan Choong Tak

- Former President of the Senate
- Party General Secretary of Parti Gerakan
- Past President of the Malaysian Federation of La Salle Associations

Tan Sri Edgar Joseph

- Federal Court Judge

Justice Lee Seiu Kin

- High Court Judge, Singapore

Lim Kien Onn

- Group Managing Director of ECM Libra Financial Group Berhad
- Founded the Libra Capital Group in 1994 and co-founded the ECM Libra Group in 2002
- Founding director and shareholder of Tune Hotels, Tune Money and AirAsia X.
- non-executive Chairman of Plato Capital Limited

John Chia

- Chairman and Group Managing Director UNISEM

Peter van Huizen

- Malaysian hockey player in the 1956 Melbourne Olympics

N. Parameswaran Nadarajah

- Malaysian Taekwondo fighter in the 1980s who represented Seremban in the National Taekwondo Championship

Stephen Van Huizen

- Former Malaysian hockey captain and coach

Mok Wai Hoon

- National Football Captain in the 1959 Merdeka Cup

Gary Vernon Fidelis

- Former Malaysian hockey player and two-time Asian All-Star

Datuk Dr. P. S. Nathan

- Asian Champion and World President, Ten-Pin Bowling

Most Rev Julian Leow Beng Kim

- Catholic Archbishop of Kuala Lumpur. (Since 2014)

YB Anthony Loke Siew Fook

- Minister Of Transport, Malaysia (2018-2020 and incumbent since 2022)
- DAP National Organizing Secretary from 2017-2022, Secretary-General since 2022
- Member of Parliament for Seremban, Negeri Sembilan

== See also ==
- Old Paulians' Association, Seremban, Malaysia
