= Old Paulians' Association, Seremban, Malaysia =

Malaysian alumni association

Old Paulians' Association
- Abbreviation: OPA
- Formation: 1922
- Founder: Bro. Lewis Edward
- Founded at: St. Paul's Institution, Seremban, Negeri Sembilan, Malaysia
- Type: Non-profit organisation
- Legal status: Alumni association
- Purpose: Alumnus of St. Paul's Institution
- Headquarters: Paulian House, 324-1 (Lot3029) Taman Bukit Kaya, Seremban, Negeri Sembilan
- Location: Malaysia
- Coordinates: 2.7284°N 101.9402°E
- Region served: Malaysia
- Parent organization: Malaysian Federation of La Sallian Alumni Associations (MFOLSA)
- Website: paulians.my
- Formerly called: St Paul's Old Boys’ Association (SPOBA)

The Old Paulians' Association (OPA) is an alumni association in Malaysia. It was founded by Brother Lewis Edward of Ireland.

== History ==
Brother Lewis Edward, an Irishman who was headmaster for St. Paul's Institution (28 April 1921 to January 1929), is credited with having started the association 22 years after the school was founded on 18 June 1899.

Old Paulians' Association has historical significance as one of the oldest alumni associations in Malaysia, tracing its root to 1922 and having witnessed firsthand the Japanese occupation in World War II (1940 to 1945) and Indonesia-Malaysia confrontation (1962 to 1966).

=== Nation building ===
OPA members include individuals noted for their nation-building contribution. Many are currently in various geographical locations and comprise former students and teachers of St. Paul's Institution (Primary) and St. Paul's Institution (Secondary). These members include Tan Sri Chan Choon Tak who served as President of Dewan Negara in Parliament Malaysia (Dec 1990 to Mar 1992), Justice Lee Seiu Kin currently serving Singapore Supreme Court, Datuk Prof. Dr. Prabir Ranjan Sen Gupta who serves National Cancer Society Malaysia as vice-president and fellow of Academy of Medicine of Malaysia, Dato’ Lai See Ming who is currently St. John Ambulance Malaysia National Chairman and Commander-in-Chief, John Fernandez who was Member of the Parliament (House of Representatives) of Malaysia for the Seremban constituency in the state of Negeri Sembilan, Anthony Loke Siew Fook who is currently Member of the Parliament (House of Representatives) of Malaysia for the Rasah constituency in the state of Negeri Sembilan and Minister of Transport, Malaysia, Jesu Maria Selvam, recognised by Malaysia Book of Records as Longest Serving Sports Official in Malaysia, 7th SEA Peninsular Games 1973 Gold Medalist (Hockey) Michael Yan Wai Pin and Stephen Van Huizen who is the current coach and also past skipper of Malaysia's national hockey team.

=== Headquarters ===
OPA currently operates from Paulian House, 324-1 Taman Bukit Kaya, Seremban, Negeri Sembilan Darul Khusus. This is the fourth OPA premise.

OPA's first premise was located at 1st Floor, 2 Market Lane, Seremban, Negeri Sembilan post World War II. OPA then later moved to another premise, 1st Floor, 78 Jalan Dato' Bandar Tunggal (formerly called Birch Road), Seremban. In 2000, it moved into its own building at 24 Jalan Yam Tuan, Seremban.

== Background ==
OPA's roots date 1922 or 23 years after the founding of St. Paul's Institution in Seremban. Bro. Lewis Edward, who was the Brother Director at that time, envisioned a fellowship of former students with the aim of continuing their prowess in athletics and sports. In the few years leading to the formation of the association, he realised the need to maintain ties with other La Sallian organisations in the region.

Together with former students, he founded St. Paul's Athletic Association (SPAA) in 1922 and opened its membership to former students of St Paul's Institution. SPAA also recognised associate members, which were former students from other La Salle schools. SPAA achieved outstanding success as its members were active participants in games and athletics.

Four years later, SPAA took steps to become a formal association and took on the name St. Paul's Old Boys’ Association or SPOBA in 1926. The primary aim then was to encourage members participate in games and athletics. This was later expanded to include social and cultural activities. SPOBA was active and saw its members competing in various tournaments and games.

The economic turmoil in the Thirties brought about numerous challenges. In that decade, St. Paul's Institution saw the comings and goings of several Brother Directors (all Irishmen) like Bro. Dominic John, Bro. Barnitus Kennedy, Brother John Lynam, Brother Joseph Brophy and Brother Anselm Conde.

SPOBA was understandably dormant during the Second World War. However, St. Paul's Institution remained open despite the hardship and bloody conflict, helmed by Bro. Henry. He was well known for personally refusing the invading Japanese forces occupying Seremban the removal of the school name.

=== After World War II ===
The end of World War II saw a sense of returning normality to life in Seremban. It gave SPOBA renewed vigour. In 1948, SPOBA came together thanks chiefly to efforts of Mr J. R. Santa Maria, Mr C. A. Pinto and Mr. Wong Ah Chong. The then District Officer, Encik Bahaman bin Shamsuddin, became SPOBA President.

SPOBA held its first Annual Reunion Dinner and Dance (ARD) in 1949 to celebrate the end of a brutal period in Seremban, bringing together survivors and friends who had lost touch with each other during the war. The start of the ARD gave life to an annual tradition that has remains the talk of town until today.

It was in 1952, SPOBA with St. Francis Association (alumni association of St. Francis Institution, Malacca) took on key roles to form the La Sallian Association and introduced La Sallian Soccer Competition. SPOBA were champions for six consecutive years in this competition, which also saw Old Boys of Christian Brothers (Singapore) and St John's Alumni Association (alumni association of St. John's Institution, Kuala Lumpur) participating. (The coming together of these alumni associations and beneficial values of fellowship gave inspiration to Mr. P. C. M. G. Mahidas (Malacca), who was responsible for the formation of Christian Brothers Old Boys’ Association or CBOBA.) SPOBA continued to be active in sports and social.

=== A period of change ===
The Seventies spelled changes. For one, Bro. Felix James Donohue succeeded Bro. Thomas Dunne (both are Irish) on 1 January 1970, as Brother Director for St. Paul's Institution. Bro. Felix was responsible for the historic start of accepting female students in Form Four and Form Six. He was also present at SPOBA Annual General Meeting (AGM) in 1970. Together with the elected Executive Committee, the task of acquiring a building as home for SPOBA started.

SPOBA then identified a suitable premise, located at Sim Garden and SPOBA Building Fund Raising project was started. Numerous Old Paulians (as members of OPA became known) who were captains of their respective industries, stepped forward to help realise the effort. A sum of RM15,000 was pledged by Paulians and well-wishers. Unfortunately, the ambitious goal was delayed as the identified building was tagged at RM70,000 and funds pledged were insufficient.

SPOBA then decided to make do and rented the first floor of a shop house at 2 Market Lane, Seremban, at its temporary home. Subsequently, SPOBA relocated to another shop house, occupying the first floor at 96 Birch Road (now known as Jalan Dato’ Bandar Tunggal), Seremban.

The first batch of female students, who enrolled in Form Six at St. Paul's Institution, had graduated in 1972 and asked to join SPOBA. As such, Old Paulians voted unanimously at SPOBA AGM in 1972 to adopt a new brand, Old Paulians’ Association (OPA), and amended provisions to accept female St Paul's Institution Secondary former students as members. Efforts to acquire a permanent home was also galvanised.

== Permanent Secretariat ==
Funds continued to be raised in a span of years. In 1978, OPA purchased two adjoining double-storey terrace houses at Taman Labu Utama, Seremban. The intent was to renovate one house, which at that time was still being constructed, as permanent home for OPA. Plans for the renovation were submitted for approval. Both properties cost RM150,000 and a bank loan of RM50,000 was secured. The remaining funds were raised from Old Paulians and supporters.

Despite promising to wait for the approval, the property developer completed constructing both properties in its original form. This was rather unfortunate and OPA was forced to continue its quest of seeking a suitable home. OPA disposed of both properties and used the proceeds to acquire a 4.842-acre land at Rasah. The idea at that time was to site OPA headquarters at that land. However, the timing couldn't be worse as the nation soon entered into a troubling economic recession. The land remained idle until the mid Nineties.

In 1995, Old Paulians voted to dispose of that land and use the proceeds to purchase a dilapidated shop lot located at 24 Jalan Yam Tuan, Seremban for RM300,000. OPA still lacked funds but resolved to realise an ambition kindled in 1970. OPA secured a bank loan of RM150,000 and organised a series of activities to raise the remaining funds from Old Paulians, well-wishers and advertisers in its ARD souvenir programmes. At last, with enough funds in hand, OPA demolished the dilapidated shop lot and constructed in its place, a three-storey building, at a cost of RM345,000.

Wisma OPA was officiated by then OPA president Tan Sri Dato' Chan Choong Tak.

The third floor currently serves to house the permanent secretariat for OPA while the remaining ground and second floor are rented.

== Founding member of Malaysian Federation of La Sallian Association ==
In December 1979, Malaysian Federation of La Sallian Associations (MFOLSA) was formed with the objective of bringing ex-students of La Salle Institutions under one umbrella. OPA is a founding member and participated at the inaugural meeting held in Penang.

=== MFOLSA 2010 ===
OPA participated at MFOLSA initiated convention in 2010. The convention was themed "The Lasallian Commitment to Transformative Education in Asia: Sharing Experiences and Drawing Insights" and held at Equatorial Hotel, Melaka, Malaysia. OPA president Hilary Sta Maria, OPA vice-president Ng Yee Tim and OPA honorary secretary Lee Kok Keong served on the event's organising committee.

== Old Paulians' Association Annual Reunion Dinners (ARD) ==
OPA's Annual Reunion Dinners are held on the first Saturday of every September. From records, an average of 1,200 OPA members and guests attend this annual event. The programme would start with a Welcome Address by the current OPA president and followed by a toast to Paduka Seri Tuanku Yang Di Pertuan Besar, a toast to Alma Mater and toast to OPA Members and Guests, followed by singing of the School Rally and Victory March.

There are also presentations of scholastic awards to students of OPA members and congratulatory awards to OPA members.

Graduating Classes celebrating their 25th Year (Silver) and 50th Year (Gold) are also invited to the stage.

During OPA 84th Annual Reunion Dinner held 4 September 2010 at Royale Bintang Resort and Spa Seremban, OPA helped raised RM500,000 to kick off SPI Secondary School Building Fund.

OPA 85th Annual Reunion Dinner will be held 3 September 2011.

== Brother Felix Donohue Student Welfare Fund (SWF) ==
The Brother Felix Donohue Student Welfare Fund (SWF) reflects OPA's aim to alleviate the financial burden of deserving Paulians. SWF is named after Reverend Brother Felix James Donohue, who currently advises SPI Secondary Board of Governors (BoG) representing De La Salle Brothers. He also was SPI Secondary principal and served the school from 1966 to 1975.

SWF is seeded with an initial sum of RM60,000 in 2010, an amount generously donated by OPA member and Sunmate Holdings Sdn Bhd managing director Chia Kwoon Meng and several OPA members from Class of 1970.

In 2011, a sum of RM30,000 will be disbursed to Paulians. As of 27 January 2011, RM20,000 of the RM30,000 has been disbursed to eight Paulians; six Upper Sixers and two Fifth Formers, in a simple presentation ceremony witnessed by OPA vice-president and SWF co-ordinator David Wee Toh Kiong and SPI Secondary principal Madam Yap See Moi.

== OPA Sports Program Initiative (SPI) ==
Owing to its prowess in athletics and sports, many Old Paulians have stepped forward to volunteer their time, energy and funds to share their experience with current school-going Paulians. OPA has taken on the role to co-ordinate such activities. There are several ongoing Sports Assistance Program like badminton and hockey, for both Young Paulians at SPI Primary and Paulians at SPI Secondary.

=== Badminton ===
Coaches Loh Yah Shang and Lee Nam Yew, both Old Paulians, are currently involved in this program which is benefiting 60 Paulians involved in this sport. Both coaches are qualified Badminton Academy of Malaysia Class 1 Certificate in Badminton Coaching.

== Past Presidents ==
The current elected OPA president Mr David Wee Toh Kiong (C69) is serving the term 2011 - 2013. Wee also serves as Badminton Association of Malaysia (BAM) executive committee member, BAM development committee chairman and BAM council vice-president.

- 1949 to 1953: Dato Seri Utama Bahaman Shamsudin
- 1953 to 1955: Mr. Goh Kheng Chin
- 1955 to 1956: Mr. Stanley Ponniah
- 1956 to 1958: Mr. Chin See Yin
- 1958 to 29 March 1978: Mr. Wong Yuen Ching
- 29 March 1979 to 25 March 2007: Tan Sri Dato' Chan Choong Tak
- 25 March 2007 to 29 March 2009: Mr. Ng Yee Tim
- 29 March 2009 to 27 March 2011: Mr. Hilary Sta Maria
- 2011 to 2019: Dato' David Wee Toh Kiong
- from 2019: Mr. Steven Chan Weng Choy

== Notable Old Paulians ==
Haji Zainal Abidin bin Ahmad

- First Malaysian to be awarded an Honorary Doctorate of Letters

YAM Tunku Nadzaruddin Ibni Tuanku Jaafar (SPI Primary)

- A royal Paulian, Youngest Son of Almarhum Tuanku Jaafar ibni Almarhum Tuanku Abdul Rahman

Allahyarham YB Bahaman bin Samsudin

- Minister of Health, Malaysia

Dr Shiekh Muszaphar Shukor (SPI Primary)

- First Malaysian in space

S. Rajaratnam

- First Foreign Minister of Singapore

Dr. S. Seevaratnam

- Member of Parliament
- DAP Founder National Treasurer
- Founding Chairman for DAP Seremban branch, the first DAP branch in the country

Chin See Yin

- Former Chairman of MCA Negeri Sembilan

Dato’ Lee Boon Peng

- Former Chairman of MCA Negeri Sembilan

Dato’ Mahima Singh

- First MIC Member of Parliament in Port Dickson

Dr Chen Man Hin

- First Chairman of DAP
- DAP Lifetime Advisor

Dato’ Dr. S. Vijayaratnam

- Cabinet Parliamentary Secretary in the Ministry of Primary Industries, Malaysia

Tan Sri Dato’ Chan Choong Tak

- Former President of the Senate
- Party General Secretary of Parti Gerakan
- Past President of the Malaysian Federation of La Salle Associations

Tan Sri Edgar Joseph

- Federal Court Judge

Justice Lee Seiu Kin

- High Court Judge, Singapore

Dato' Lim Kien Onn

- Group Managing Director of ECM Libra Financial Group Berhad
- Founded the Libra Capital Group in 1994 and co-founded the ECM Libra Group in 2002
- Founding director and shareholder of Tune Hotels, Tune Money and AirAsia X.
- non-executive Chairman of Plato Capital Limited

John Chia

- Chairman and Group Managing Director UNISEM

Peter van Huizen

- Malaysian hockey player in the 1956 Melbourne Olympics

N. Parameswaran Nadarajah

- Malaysian Taekwondo fighter in the 1980s who represented Seremban in the National Taekwondo Championship

Stephen Van Huizen

- Former Malaysian hockey captain and coach

Mok Wai Hoon

- National Football Captain in the 1959 Merdeka Cup

Gary Vernon Fidelis

- Former Malaysian hockey player and two-time Asian All-Star

Datuk Dr. P. S. Nathan

- Asian Champion and World President, Ten-Pin Bowling

Dato' Lai See Ming

- National Chairman and Commander-in-Chief, St. John Ambulance Council of Malaysia

Most Rev Julian Leow Beng Kim

- Catholic Archbishop of Kuala Lumpur. (Since 2014)

YB Anthony Loke Siew Fook

- Minister Of Transport Malaysia.(Since 2018 and 2022)
- 6th Secretary-General of DAP since March 2022
- Former DAP National Organizing Secretary
- Member of Parliament for Seremban Constituency, Negeri Sembilan

YB Cha Kee Chin

- Member of Parliament for Rasah Constituency, Negeri Sembilan

== See also ==
- St. Paul's Institution
