= Van Huizen =

Van Huizen is a Dutch surname. Notable people with this surname include:

- Christopher van Huizen (born 1992), Singaporean footballer
- Lawrence Van Huizen (1930–2019), Malaysian field hockey player
- Peter van Huizen (1932–2011), Malaysian field hockey player
- Stephen Van Huizen (born 1958), Malaysian field hockey player
- Toine van Huizen (born 1990), Dutch footballer

Lawrence, Peter, and Stephen van Huizen are related to each other.
