= St. George's Institution, Taiping =

St. George's Institution
- Institusi St. George

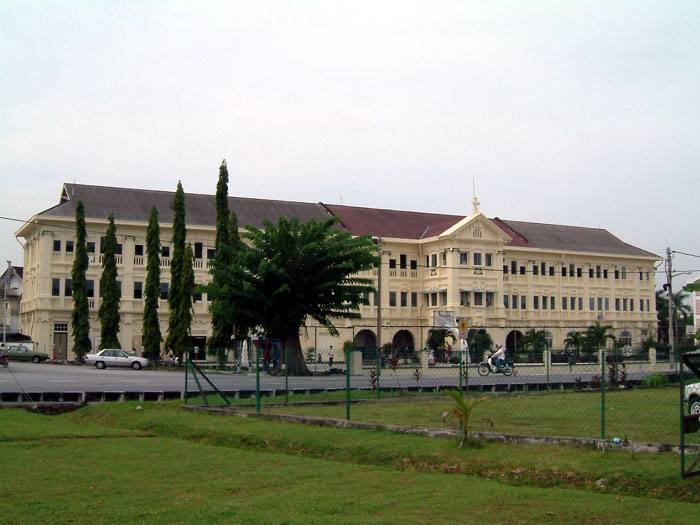
- The historical 1915 academic block of St. George's Institution.

Location
- Station Road, 34000; Taiping, Perak; Malaysia

Information
- Type: All-boys primary and secondary school
- Motto: Latin: Honor virtutis praemium (Honor is the reward for virtue)
- Religious affiliation: Christian
- Denomination: Roman Catholic Church
- Established: 18 January 1915
- School district: Larut, Matang and Selama
- Principal: Raymond Mariadas
- Grades: Standard 1 - 6 Form 1 - 6
- Gender: Male; Co-educational (Form 6)
- Enrolment: 1410 (2008)
- Colours: Green and White
- Feeder schools: SK St. George 1, Taiping; SMK St. George, Taiping
- Founder: De La Salle Brothers
- Chairman: Joseph Lau Tee Soon
- Employees: 83 teachers and 15 general staff
- Abbreviation: SGI
- Website: sgi.edu.my

Saint George's Institution (Malay: Institusi Saint George; abbreviated SGI) is a public all-boys (and girls for Sixth Form) and is one of the oldest schools in Taiping, Perak. The school is known by its initials, "SGI", and the students of St. George's Institution are called Georgians for boys and Georgianas for girls.

It was founded by a group of La Salle brothers from Penang as a Catholic boys' school. The school is surrounded by four roads, Station Road (front), Barrack Road (behind), Cross Street No. 9 and Cross Street No. 10.

== History ==
On 4 March 1914, Brother James Joseph Byrne visited the town Taiping, Perak. He suggested to the then British Resident of Perak, Sir Reginald George Watson (1913–1919), for the establishment of a Catholic school for boys. His request was approved by the Perak State Government, and a piece of land nearby the hospital was granted. The land was donated by the Kwa Family, one of the wealthy Chinese families of the town. In 1914, the foundation stone was laid by the then Acting Resident of Perak, Oliver Marks, and the opening ceremony was attended by prominent European families and Malay rulers where most of them comprised from the State Council Members and the social elites in Perak.

The school was completed in 1915, with 7 teachers, 49 students and 6 classes, housed together in the original three-storey building. The St. George's main building was designed by a colonial architect from Penang, in the mixture of Neo-Grec and Neo-Romanesque architecture, with two wings and a main porch in front (facing the Station Road). The charming building is still standing today and serves as the school's front facade. ..

The first Director of the school was Brother James Gilbert who served as the director and principal in the first year of its establishment (he later returned to serve another term in 1923). The school was run by La Sallian missionaries from all around the world, however it received partial financial assistance from the State Government. After Malaya gained independence from the British Government in 1957, the school continued on as a missionary school with limited funding from the government though it was staffed with teachers from the Education Department. As from 2006, the school is funded 95% by the Ministry of Education of Malaysia.

During World War II, along with other schools in the town, St. George's was closed down. It was converted into the headquarters for the Kempetai. The rumoured brutality and torture committed by the Japanese military police during the tenure of the school is a source of ghostly legends commonly circulated by the students even today. The Lassalian brothers were placed under house detention, old boys of the school during this period time risked their lives to assist the detained missionaries. The school reopened at the end of the war along with other schools, such as SMK King Edward VII, St. John's Institution, SMK Victoria Institution and St. Michael's Institution.

== List of former Georgian Teachers ==
- Brother James Macken who now resides at Downpatrick, Northern Ireland. Served at St. George's in November 1949 until August 1965. He also served as a teacher at St. Xavier's and Director of St. Paul's in Seremban.
- Brother Cyrenius, formerly Bro Patrick, served St. George's in 1956 to 1959. He lives in La Salle Home in Belfast.
- Brother Columba, served SGI in 1956 to 1957. He is posted as Home Supervisor in La Salle Home in Belfast.
- Brother Cyprian, also Gerald Donovan served SGI from 1959 to 1967. He continued to teach in England and retired there.
- Peter Reutens formerly Bro Matthew, served SGI 1958-1963 and 1968-1972. He lives in Perth, Australia.
- Brother John D'Cruz, taught in SGI 1965-1967, 1970, 1973–1974 and 1978-1982 as Director. He is in Rome on a three-year contract.
- Brother Tiberius Lawrence Spitzig later posted as the Brother Director of St. John's Institution (1955–1961).
- Brother Stephen Edward Buckley later posted as the Brother Director of St. John's Institution from 1923 to 1924.

== Notable Old Georgians ==
- Ang Kok Peng - Dean of Faculty of Science at the National University of Singapore. Elected member of the Singapore Legislative Assemblyman. He has been the Ambassador of Singapore to Japan for three years from February 1971 to 1974 and also the Minister of State for Communication of Singapore.
- Gregory Yong - Roman Catholic Archbishop Emeritus of Singapore. On 2 April 1977, he was installed as the Roman Catholic Archbishop of Singapore. He was the second Archbishop of the Archdiocese of Singapore, which was formed in 1972 when the Archdiocese of Malacca-Singapore split and held the office until his retirement on 14 October 2000.
- Ismail Khan Ibrahim Khan — the First Chief Justice of the High Courts in Borneo States, he was the Chief Judge for Negri Sembilan and Malacca, and was awarded the Distinguished Service Medal. He was also the first Malay to study law overseas and received the prestigious Queen's Scholarship.
- Manecksha Rustim — Parsi merchant and land proprietor, founder member MIC Taiping and President of the political party since 1967. Director of Election for Larut Selatan 1969 (Alliance), Member of Town Board, Justice of Peace (JP), Member Licensing Board. A road in Taiping was named after him: Jalan Manecksha (formerly Cross Street No.3).
- Ng Kam Poh — Member of the Parliament 1965, Dr. Ng also the Deputy Minister of Finance in July 1965 later Minister of Health. He was the Minister of Welfare Services just before general elections in May 1969 when he lost his Parliamentary seat.
- Ong H. T. - recipient of a Queen Scholarship in 1931 to study Law in London, he was Federal Counsel in Kuala Lumpur, and later posted as the Chief Federal Judge of Malaya.
- Toh Chin Chye - co-founder and the Chairman of the People's Action Party (PAP) and served as the Member of Parliament for Rochore since 1959, Deputy Prime Minister when Singapore attained independence in 1965, Minister for Science and Technology and Minister for Health, Singapore. He was also the Chairman of Singapore Polytechnic and Vice-Chancellor of the University of Singapore.

== Affiliations ==
SGI is affiliated to other La Sallian Educational Institutions.
