= STJ =

STJ may refer to:

- IATA code for Rosecrans Memorial Airport
- St. John's International School (disambiguation)
- St. John's University (New York)
- Postal code for St. Julian's, Malta
- Station code for Severn Tunnel Junction railway station, Rogiet, Wales
- Superconducting tunnel junction
- Superior Tribunal de Justiça, the highest court in Brazil
