= Ikhwan Salim Sujak =

Malaysian politician and corporate figure (1956–2025)

Yang Berbahagia Dato' Ikhwan Salim Sujak DSIS KMN
- إخوان سليم سوجق

Senator Appointed by the Selangor State Assembly
- In office 6 December 2006 – 5 December 2009
- Monarch: Mizan Zainal Abiddin
- Prime Minister: Abdullah Ahmad Badawi (2006–2009); Najib Razak (2009)

Division Chief of the United Malays National Organisation of Damansara
- In office 11 May 2000 – 18 March 2023
- President: Mahathir Mohamad (2000–2004); Abdullah Ahmad Badawi (2004–2009); Najib Razak (2009–2018); Ahmad Zahid Hamidi (2018–2023)
- Succeeded by: Azli Mohemed Saad

Personal details
- Born: Ikwan Salim bin Sujak; 1 October 1956 Selangor, Malaysia
- Died: 7 April 2025 (aged 68) Kuala Lumpur, Malaysia
- Party: United Malays National Organisation (UMNO)
- Other political affiliations: Barisan Nasional (BN)
- Education: St John's Institution; Queen's University Belfast (BSc)
- Occupation: Politician; Corporate figure

Ikhwan Salim bin Sujak (Jawi: إخوان سليم سوجق, Malay pronunciation: [ick.one]; 1 October 1956 – 7 April 2025) was a Malaysian politician and corporate figure who served as a Senator under Prime Minister Abdullah Ahmad Badawi from December 2006 to December 2009. He was a member of the United Malays National Organisation (UMNO), a component party of the BN coalition and was the former Division Chief of UMNO Damansara and Petaling Jaya Utara before the electoral district realignment in 2018.

== Early life and education ==
Ikhwan Salim was born on 1 October 1956 and furthered his studies in Northern Ireland for his bachelor's degree in Economics and Accounting where he graduated at the Queen's University Belfast in 1977.

== Corporate career ==
Salim worked as an accountant with Coopers and Lybrand in Belfast where he worked under the auditing, tax and consulting divisions. Upon returning to Malaysia, Ikhwan was attached to Nestle Malaysia Berhad in 1979 and shortly after joined Low Keng Huat Property Group from 1980 to 1983 where he was involved in fields such as telecommunication, financing, and healthcare.

During his later years in the corporate sector, Ikhwan has held several board memberships of public listed companies such as being Chairman of Malaysia Steel Works KL (MASTEEL), Non-Executive Chairman of GLOMAC Berhad, and Member of the Board of SME Corp.

== Death ==
Salim died from heart complications at the National Heart Institute in Kuala Lumpur, on 7 April 2025, at the age of 68.

== Honours ==
=== Honours of Malaysia ===
- Malaysia
  - Officer of the Order of the Defender of the Realm (KMN) (2003)
- Selangor
  - Knight Companion of the Order of Sultan Sharafuddin Idris Shah (DSIS) – Dato' (2002)
