= St. John's Institution =

School in Kuala Lumpur, Malaysia

- Sekolah Menengah Kebangsaan St. John
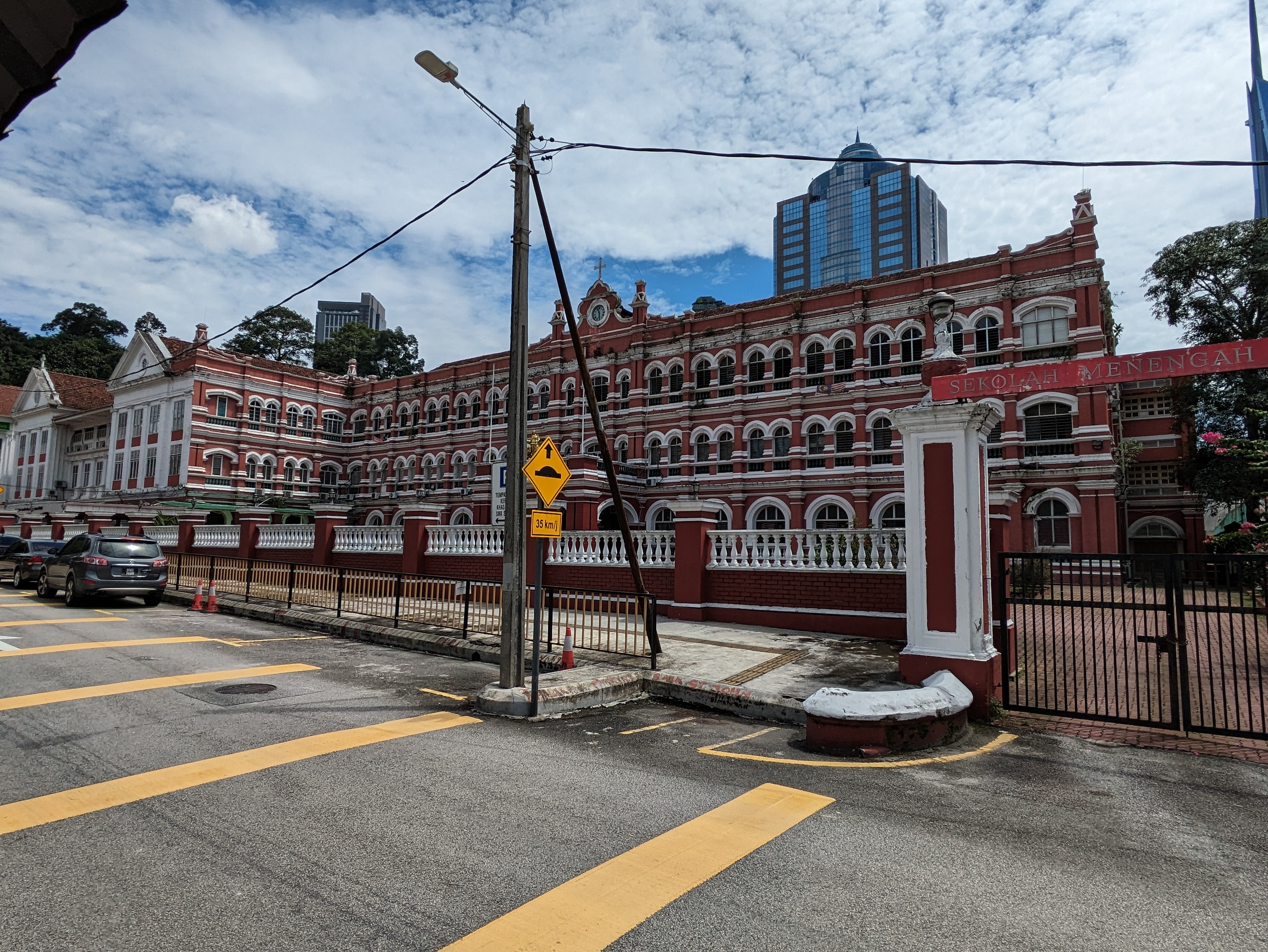
- St. John's Institution

Location
- Jalan Bukit Nanas; Kuala Lumpur, 50250; Malaysia

Information
- Former name: Sekolah Menengah Kebangsaan St. John
- School type: Cluster school of excellence All-boys primary and secondary school
- Motto: Latin: Fide et labore English: "Faith and Zeal"
- Religious affiliation: Catholic
- Denomination: Roman Catholic Church
- Established: 18 January 1904
- Status: Operational
- Sister school: Convent Bukit Nanas
- School district: Keramat
- Principal: Sivakumar a/l Thannimalay
- Grades: (SK) Standard 1–6 (SMK) Form 1–6
- Gender: Male: Form 1-5; Co-ed: Form 6
- Campus type: Urban
- Houses: Cornelius (Red); Claude (Blue); Stephen (Yellow); D.Joseph (Green); Gilbert (Brown)
- Colors: Gold and green
- Yearbook: Garudamas
- Feeder schools: SK St. John, Kuala Lumpur; St. John's International School
- Affiliation: Malaysia Ministry Of Education
- Alumni President: Mohd Isham Ishak
- Website: stjohninstitution.blogspot.com//

St. John's Institution (abbreviated SJI) or formerly known as St. John's National Secondary School (Malay: Sekolah Menengah Kebangsaan St. John) is a public all-boys school (sixth form is co-ed) and is one of the oldest schools in Kuala Lumpur, Malaysia. The school is widely known by its initials, SJI and the students of St. John's Institution bear the name Johannians.

While it is commonly thought that the school is named after Jean-Baptiste de la Salle, the founder of the De La Salle Christian Brothers Order and also known as the Patron Saint of Teachers, the school actually takes its name from St. John the Evangelist Church which sponsors their surrounding parish which is also located nearby on Jalan Bukit Nanas.

SJI consists of a primary school and a secondary school. The primary and secondary schools initially were fee paying missionary schools and remained such until the 1970s. They functioned together until the increase in pupil enrollment led to the separation of the primary school in 1960. The primary schools were formerly known in Malay as Sekolah Kebangsaan St. John (1) and Sekolah Kebangsaan St. John (2) until the primary schools were officially merged again recently. The newly merged primary school is known today in Malay as Sekolah Kebangsaan St. John.

The secondary school was called Sekolah Menengah Kebangsaan St. John, but it was announced in April 2016 that the name would be reverted to St John's Institution, a decision widely applauded by alumni and backed by another Johannian, Sultan Nazrin Shah of Perak.

SJI was among the first 30 schools selected for the Cluster School Scheme when it was first introduced in 2007 by the Ministry of Education, Malaysia.

The La Sallian Brothers and the Board of Governors still hold much more autonomy over the management of the secondary school compared to the Malaysian Ministry of Education. This has allowed the secondary school to maintain a certain amount of prestige. Though the school land is owned by the Roman Catholic Church (including St. John's Cathedral, Kuala Lumpur which is next to the school), much of the school funding is received from the Government of Malaysia.

== Site and architecture ==
The main school building is located in Jalan Bukit Nanas, in the city centre of Kuala Lumpur, next to the Bukit Nanas Forest Reserve, giving it a lush setting. St. John's Primary Schools are located across the road from the main school building. While the Convent Bukit Nanas, an Infant Jesus Sisters' school for the girls, the AIA building, and the Archdiocese of Kuala Lumpur are located further down the road. The Fatima Kindergarten (housed in what is Kuala Lumpur's oldest Catholic church and now converted into a community service centre) and the Roman Catholic St John's Cathedral are located on the road leading up to SJI.

The school is famous for its imposing red and white brick main building with Grecian-Spanish influences where it has been recognized as a Kuala Lumpur Heritage Building since 1986, where else it was gazetted as a National Heritage Site by the Government of Malaysia on 21 May 2010 through National Heritage Department.

== Administration ==
The school has traditionally been headed by the brothers of the La Sallian order, with a brother director (like a headmaster) and a brother supervisor (like a deputy headmaster). In recent years, the brother supervisor was replaced with three assistant principals, who are not in the La Sallian order.

=== Former Brother Director of St. John's Institution ===
Portrait	Name	Took office	Left office	Notes
	Julian Francis	1904		
	James Gilbert	1904	1910	Saw the construction of the Main Block
	Adrian Edmund	1911	1913	
	Marcian Cullen	1913	1915	
	Claude Marie Guibert	1916	1921	Introduced Sports Day in 1921
	Barnitus Kennedy	1921	1923	
	Stephen Edward Buckley	1923	1925	Built the existing Brothers' Quarters
	Defendant Louis	1925	1930	Installed the statue of Jean Baptist de La Salle
	Cornelius Nulty	1930	1946	Longest serving brother director, built a school hall in 1936
	Amor Matthias	1946	1948	
	Dositheus Joseph Brophy	1948	1954	
	Lawrence Spitzig	1955	1961	Wrote SJI's School Rally and introduced many improvement projects to the school during his two terms
	Celestine Jennings	1958		Was appointed director when Spitzig went on leave to Canada
	Ignatius Barry	1962		Deteriorating health forced him to return to Ireland in September that year
	Joseph McNally	1962	1967	An accomplished artiste and sculptor, designed the present school badge and introduced many sculptures and murals to the school arts block (form 5 block) which was built in 1965 during his serving years. He painted the school's exterior white and some of his works are still standing today. He went on to establish the LASALLE College of the Arts in Singapore in 1984
	Basilian Wong	1967	1969	Cleared the immense debt incurred by the development committee under Joseph McNally
	Joseph Yeoh	1969	1977	Former student of St. John's. First Malaysian to lead the school. Repainted the school to its current color scheme. Introduced Appreciation Day in 1972.
	Lawrence Spitzig	1978	1983	Wrote SJI's School Rally and introduced many improvement projects to the school during his two terms
	Cassian Pappu	1983	1988	Served in La Salle Klang before taking up brother director's role in St. John's. Built a form 6 block called the Tan Sri Dominic Vendargon Building.
	Michael Wong	1989	2002	The last brother director of St. John

The headship of the school passed to the laity in 2002 when Peter Yii Sing Chiu became the first non-brother and non-Catholic to head the school, ending 98 years of brothers' administration.

=== Former and current principals of St. John's Institution ===
Name of principal	Took office	Left office	Comments
Peter Yii Sing Chiu	2002	2009	First non-Catholic principal.
Leong Kum Loy	2009	2009	
Lim Hean Hwa	2009	2014	Second Johannian to lead St. John's after his own principal, Joseph Yeoh. He was a student from 1961 - 1973
M. Puvanendran	2014	2016	First non-Christian principal.
Manmohan Singh a/l Kartar Singh	2016	2022	He officially retired on 13 May 2022.
Ravi Chandran a/l Krishnan	2022	2024	First Catholic principal since 2002.
Sivakumar a/l Thannimalay	2024	Present	

Brothers who have served as primary school headmasters since leaving the secondary school include Patrick Arokiasamy, Alban Tang and Matthew Liew.

On 1 December 2009, Peter Yii Sing Chiu was replaced by Leong Kum Loy. Under the administration of Leong Kum Loy, St. John has been declared a heritage site by the Malaysian government.

The administration of the school has been continued until now by Sivakumar a/l Thannimalay, the seventh principal of SJI who has started serving from January 2023. He is assisted by three senior assistants as follows;

- Senior assistant of administration and curriculum: Rohani binti Jusoh
- Senior assistant of student affairs: Musannef bin Yatim
- Senior assistant of co-curricular activities: Eza Hamni bin Mohammad
- Senior assistant of form six: Sharimala a/p Bahsu

== History ==
Year	Events
1904	On 18 January 1904, at the earnest request of the Education Department and the then Bishop of Malacca, Mgr. Fee, the La Sallian Brothers opened a school in Kuala Lumpur. The Staff consisted of three Brothers and three lay masters. According to the Malay Mail, Sir Hugh Clifford who visited St. John's in August 1927 recalled that it started with an initial enrolment of 18 boys.; On 15 January, three days before classes were to commence, three Brothers arrived to take charge of the school – Brother Julian Francis from Hong Kong, Brother Andrew Corsini from Burma and Brother Cyril Alexander from Penang.; The school building was a two-storeyed wooden structure, 80 feet long and 20 feet wide, with brick pillars and a verandah facing the north.; Later in the year, Brother James Gilbert arrived from Singapore to take the place of Brother Julian Francis as Brother Director of St. John's Institution
1905	On 2 January 1905, the school reopened with an additional staff member, Brother Vernier Augustus. A Standard 7 was set up and entrusted to Brother Cyril Alexander.; With this new set-up, expansion was needed. So Father Renard lent to the school the house of the Chinese Catechist which was capable of holding one class and also an attap shed near the site now occupied by the Telecoms.; In August 1905, Brother Felix Paulian arrived to join the staff
1906	In June 1906, Brother Imier of Jesus, Provincial Visitor of the United States paid a visit to St. John's . He later became Superior General in 1913.; As the school rapidly increased in numbers, the Brothers began to look for a suitable site for a new building. Meanwhile, more classes were opened and accommodated in temporary structures.; Finally the government provided a piece of land given to the mission for religious and educational purposes.; The building was designed by fellow staff member, Brother V. Augustus; On 3 November, the foundation stone for the new building was laid by Sir Henry Conway Belfield, Resident Councilor for Selangor.
1907	After much difficulty and delay, the new building was finally completed and officially declared open by the High Commissioner and Governor, Sir John Anderson on 10 August 1907. At the end of the year, the new building was advanced enough to be used for the Cambridge Examination for all the candidates of Kuala Lumpur.
1908	Brother Gilbert was given a short but well deserved rest in Ceylon and the school was left temporarily in the charge of Brother Augustine. Brother Gilbert also intended to start a Science Laboratory but his intention was not fulfilled because during his absence, Brother V. Augustus on whom he had been relying for the scheme had been transferred to St. Xavier's Institution in Penang
1914	The Brothers' Building was enlarged by the addition of two new wings which were to house the chapel and offices and the Juniorate and Novitiate.; Brother Marcian Cullen was appointed Director of the newly formed Juniorate.
1915	A Cadet Corps was formed followed shortly by a Scout Troop which unfortunately did not last very long
1916	Brother Gilbert who continued in office till 1916 had cherished the dream of a swimming pool in the valley south of the school, but financial and other difficulties prevented his fulfilment; He also started a fund for the construction of a school hall, but the outbreak of World War I checked his efforts—and those of his successors, too.; In November 1916, Brother Claude Marie Guibert replaced Brother Gilbert as Director and remained in office till his transfer to Malacca in 1921
1921	Brother Stephen Edward Buckley (Director 1921–1925) demolished the Brothers' Building and replaced it with the present one, to which additions were made later.
1925	Brother Louis, who was appointed Sub-Director in December 1924, took Brother Stephen's place in 1925 and remained until his transfer in 1930. He initiated the plan of enlarging the playground by filling up part of the valley, but the success of this enterprise was reserved for his successor, Brother Cornelius.; The golden statue of Jean Baptiste De La Salle, the founder of the Brothers as it stands in front of the famous red and white Romanesque style building of St. John's Institution which is an iron cast statue, arrived from France in February 1925 and was installed the same year in a ceremony carefully conducted by Rev. Father L. Duvell under the watch of Brother Louis
1930	Brother Cornelius Nulty served as Brother Director from 1930 to 1946 and under his energetic management, many projects were brought to a successful conclusion.; Brother Cornelius enlarged the playground, a project that was started by Brother Louis. He then turned his attention to the building of the hall which was finally completed in 1936 with the provision for two more storeys in the future.; Brother Cornelius next built a new wing on the east side of the Brothers' Building, which became the Boarding Department (later De La Salle Institute, now St. John's International School). He was on the process of starting work on the Science Laboratory, the cherished dream of the Brothers for a long time, when the Second World War broke out and turned his attention to other things.
1942-1945	During World War II, SJI was closed but crowds of refugees flocked to Brother Cornelius for help and stayed in the school for security. When the war ended and peace returned, these refugees organised a scholarship fund to express gratitude to Brother Cornelius and to perpetuate his memory.
1946	In September 1946, Brother Cornelius was given a leave of absence to recuperate from the effects of the war, and was replaced by Brother Amor Matthias. Brother Matthias made every effort to reorganize our school which was completely torn apart during the Japanese Occupation
1948	In May 1948, Brother D. Joseph Brophy began his term of office during which he established the feeder schools of La Salle School, Sentul and La Salle School, Brickfields, completed the plans for La Salle School, Peel Road (later renamed as SMK Yaacob Latiff in 1993) and saw the beginnings of La Salle School, Klang; In St. John's itself, he renovated the school hall as well as built a new, up-to-date cafeteria. A large comfortable space staff room and new offices appeared. A spacious modern library was furnished and equipped and an extensive P.A. system was installed.
1953	On 15 April, the first issue of the Term Review was on sale. The Term Review was the predecessor to the current editorial board of The Garudamas, the school magazine.; On 11 February 1953, Col. J.S. Wilson, the Director of International Bureau of Boy Scouts, accompanied by Mr. E.M.P. Payne, Scout Commissioner for the Federation of Malaya, visited St. John's; On 14 January, a fun-fair was held to raise funds for the extension of the school field. The school library was officially opened by Bro. Director
1954	In the Golden Jubilee year, Brother D. Joseph achieved his final objective – the completion of the field extension.; The Golden Jubilee year saw the publication of a special Magazine of the same name.; "Macbeth" performed by the St. John's Institution's Dramatic Society, proven well, became a major hit and started going on tour to schools across Kuala Lumpur and Malaya
1955	After nearly seven years of strenuous work, Brorher Joseph was given a short holiday, but after his return, in May 1955 he was posted to St. Xavier's, Penang and Brother Tiberius Lawrence Spitzig starts his first term as Brother Director of St. John's Institution.; The Dramatic Society staged its second play, 'Twelfth Night', and the newly formed school orchestra made its first public appearance at the play's public performance in the hall. Brother Celestine (later, Brother Director) was responsible for the success of the play.
1956	Brother Lawrence carried out more work on the renovation of the school and added 14 classrooms at a cost of M$90,000 (equivalent to RM4,713,959.78 as of 2024)
1957	At the urgent request of the Government, a vocational school was built, costing $50000 (equivalent to RM2,618,866.72 as of 2024). The vocational classes are located at the foot of the hill (behind the present day St. John's Primary School); The Brothers took over La Salle to Jinjang; General Sir Francis Festing, Commander-in-Chief of the Far East visited St. John's.
1958	In accordance with a new government directive, a Board of Governors for the school was set up and the first meeting was held on 24 September. In the primary section, the Board of Managers held its first meeting on 13 March.
1959	His Excellency Mgr John Gordon, Chargé d'Affaires of the Apostolic Delegation of Thailand and Malaya visited SJI on 27 January.; Construction of the St John's Primary School began on the site of the Old Boys' Club. The building could accommodate 24 classes and would cost M$220,000; A new branch school, La Salle School, Petaling Jaya, was started; On 22 October, Mr Liew Kwong Hon, a former Johannian who had donated $50,000 towards the election of the Science Block and Laboratory in 1949, died
1960	On 16 September, St John's Primary School was officially opened by Brother Fintan Blake, Visitor.; The new chapel on the middle floor of SJI was officially opened and used on 19 October.; On 28 July, Brother V. Augustus died after a short illness. He arrived in Malaya in 1904
1961	Renovations to the Brothers' Quarters on the 3rd floor wee completed. The Visual Aid Room (RESOS) was further improved and the Library reorganized and moved to the second floor. A new Biology laboratory was added to the Science Department.; The Primary School building was officially blessed by Mgr Dominic Vendargon; At the end of 1961, Brother Lawrence was transferred to Penang to take over St. Xavier's Institution. He had been with St. John's since prewar days, and as Director had brought about many changes and improvements, particularly to the classrooms and the Brothers' Quarters.; He encouraged extral-mural activities which led to the founding of St. John's Orchestra and the Cadet Corps Band. Under him, the Brothers' work expanded into and were firmly established in Peel Road, Jinjang and Petaling Jaya.
1962	Mr. Ng Eng Hiam, donated the new library in the Brothers' Quarters and founded the St. John's Institution Librarians.; Brother Ignatius who replaced Brother Lawrence gave all his attention to raising of academic standards in the school.; In June, Brother Nicet-Joseph, Superior General of the La Salle Brothers paid a visit to the school and spent a lot of time with the Brothers and in other schools under their care.; In September 1962, due to failing health, Brother Ignatius was forced to return to Ireland, and his place was taken by Brother Joseph McNally
1963	Under Brother Joseph McNally, St. John's entered into a new phase of expansion and development. His first major project was the draining and enlarging of the school field, made possible by the generous donation of $20,000 from Mr Lim Foo Yong; The first St. John's Big Walk was organised in which more than 1000 boys took part; The present school badge (designed by Brother Joseph McNally) was used, replacing the old badge by Brother Cornelius Nulty.
1964-1967	The most important event in 1964 was the Diamond Jubilee of the school; An elaborate programme of celebrations was organised in May which lasted two weeks. Among the highlights was an operetta "The Bamboo Princess" which was acted by pupils of the school and the Convent. The distinguished guest for the occasion was His Royal Highness, the Sultan of Selangot, who also attended the Diamond Jubilee Athletic Meet.; In January 1964, the school embarked on its programme of expansion and development by the formation of a Development Committee headed by the then Minister of Home Affairs, the late Tun Dr Ismail Abdul Rahman, and in the next three years, the following projects were completed: 1. A new Six-Form Arts Block consisting of a four-storey building with nine classrooms and a modern cafeteria. The foundation stone was laid by Tun Dr Ismail Abdul Rahman and on completion, the building was blessed by His Excellency, Bishop D. Vendargon on 28 August 1965.; 2. The improvement of library facilities with the addition of an air-conditioned reference library for Form Six and two reading rooms above the lending library. The library was officially declared open by Mr Ng Eng Hiam who had generously donated $30,000 to the project.; 3. A handsome portico leading through a marble-floored colonise to the main staircase of the school.; 4. The construction of a block consisting of two lecture theatres, each capable of holding 300 pupils, and a modern gymnasium. This block is named the Shaw Building.; 5. The old tennis court in front of the school was moved to another site to provide a much needed car park for the teachers.; 6. In the Primary School, a new, spacious and impressive hall, named Dewan Tun Dr. Ismail, was built to cater the needs of both the Secondary and Primary Schools.; Being an artist, Brother Joseph brought art and beauty into these expansions and renovations, blending harmoniously the old and the new in architecture. His Japanese Garden added beauty and serenity to the atmospheric of the school.; In mid-1967, Brother Joseph's term of office came to an end and Brother Basillian Wong became the 17th Director of St. John's.
1967-1969	Brother Basillian's immediate and main task was to clear the immense debt incurred in the expansion and improvements carried out during the previous years—a task which he courageously and successfully accomplished eventually.; Among the fund-raising projects carried out was a two-day food and fun fair in August 1968 which realised $42,000.
1969	In January 1969, Brother Joseph Yeoh, a former Johannian returned to become the Brother Director. He was the first local Brother to head the school and whose father, Mr Yeoh Teik Soo, had been a teacher here for 40 years. Brother Joseph gave all his attention to both school and extramural activities and ensured that the school's excellent facilities were made available to both the morning and afternoon sessions. Under him, there was an outburst of activities in the school and St. John's reached its greatest heights in sports and games during his tenure.
1970	St. John's captured the coveted King's Cup for Badminton which it retained for two years and the Benson & Hedges Gold Trophy for the National Under-21 Badminton Championship
1971	On 15 May, Brother Michael Jacques, Assistant Superior General of the Christian Brothers, paid an official visited to St. John's.; The Main Block was given its current red and white colour scheme. The school was previously painted completely white in the 1960s.
1972	A Charity Big Walk raised $43,000 to establish a welfare fund for needy pupils and a Fishathon netted $9,000 which was used for improving school facilities and the school band.; Eighteen La Salle Schools, including St. John's, assembled at the school field to welcome Brother Charles Henry, Superior General of the La Salle Brothers.
1973	For the first time, the student body cast their votes for the election of the School Caotain. The Parent-Teacher Association was formed, with Senator Tan Sri SOK Ubaidullah as the first chairman.
1974	70th Anniversary of the school was celebrated on a grand scale
1976	Awards Day was first introduced by Brother Joseph Yeoh to show appreciation to those who had excelled in games and school activities and those who had given valuable service to the school.
1977	The P.T.A. organised a lottery in aid of St. John's Development Fund which brought in $69,000. The money was used for the installation of a central air-condition unit in the Reference Library, the purchase of a larger school bus and the renovation of the Lecture Theatres.; The Scouts Den was officially opened by the former Minister of Public Enterprise, Datuk Hj Mohammed Yaakob on 5 November
1978	Brother Joseph Yeoh was awarded the Ahli Mangku Negara (A.M.N.) by His Majesty the Yang di-Pertuan Agong in recognition of his services as an educationist.; He left St. John's at the end of the year for his new post as Auxiliary Brother Visitor of West Malaysia. He had served the school for a whole decade.
1979	Brother Lawrence Spitzig returned as director of the school and presided over the school's Diamond Jubilee celebrations. Bro. Lawrence re-introduced the annual English and Bahasa Malaysia public speaking competition to the school. Public speaking became part of the English and Bahasa Malaysia curriculum and was compulsory for all students, resulting in SJI having many enabled and proficient public speakers amongst the students.; Pass rates of the 1979 results were a dismal to all, Royal Military College at 46%, Victoria Institution at 50%, St. John's Institution at 55.5% and Methodist Boys School at 66.3%
1983	The "Good Shepherd" of St. John's, Brother Lawrence, retired on his 65th birthday on 4 February. He joined the Christian Brothers at the age of 17 and still serve St. John's until his passing in 2009 at the grand age of 91.
1984	To kick off the 80th Anniversary of the founding of the school, Carnival Day and several projects were introduced to raise funds for the construction of a four-storey building adjacent to the science block to accommodate the lower and upper sixth form classes. This is the beginning of a series of fund raising projects initiated to upgrade the school and its facilities. Over the years, St John's has been blessed with generous contributions from its generations of former students and benefactors.; One of the first official functions of the then Education Minister, Datuk Abdullah Ahmad Badawi was the opening of the Association of School Canteen Operators held at St. John's Primary School. The theme was "anti-junk food".; A month later, Datuk Seri Abdullah Ahmad Badawi returned to SJI to launch the 80th anniversary "Karnival Ria" festivities and made a handsome and decorative speech on racial integration. Pak Lah, as he is affectionately known until today, sent his son Kamal to St. John's.; Old Boy Bosco D'Cruz returned to compere the 80th anniversary dinner gala. Bosco, a well known TV personality and dramatist, was one of the earlier Johannians to make an impact on the local performing arts scene.
1986	Funfairs, carnivals, Job-A-Longs and Walkathons were held to fund the building of the sports complex. The 1986 Walkathon netted an incredible RM120,000 which allowed construction to begin. The "sports block" was promised by the company, Dairy Maid as compensation for the temporary loss of the school field. It was to have two halls, one of which is an open air on the ground floor, and the other with a stage with a floor area for three badminton courts. On the first floor, three squash courts (one with a gallery) and an education gallery with a library (pusat sumber) and surau; One of the programmes initiated by Brother Cassian Pappu was the exchange programme with Japanese schools. Every year, a batch of Japanese school seniors would spend a month in St. John's, learning English and Bahasa Malaysia and experiencing Malaysian culture. St. John's in turn, sends a contingent over to Japan
1988	The new Form 6 Block was built and named Bangunan Tan Sri Dominic Vendargon (the Tan Sri Dominic Vendargon Building).
1989	The Form Sixes moved in the newly completed Form 6 Block (Bangunan Tan Sri Dominic Vendargon) and with this, floating classes came to rest. This building is the last major renovation and upgrade that came to St. John's Institution.; The 85th Anniversary was celebrated in a big way with Heritage Night and the publication of a slim souvenir booklet called "The Johannian Heritage". Raja Datin Seri Nor Mahani, a fondly remembered teacher, also left the school that year. She was regarded by many as an excellent teacher and teacher-advisor to Garudamas, handling many SJI projects from Speech Day to the Heritage Night Gala, from the Literary and Drama Society to the famous St. John's Fencing Club (disbanded in 2022) which she pioneered.
1991	The third and current library was officially donated and opened on 13 January 1991 by Mr. Ng Thiam Weng, son of Mr. Ng Eng Hiam.
1994	By 1994, St. John's Institution boasted over 60 clubs and societies, the highest number of any school in the Klang Valley.; The sports complex comprising a badminton hall, three squash courts, and concourse was officiated by Brother David Liao on 18 January.
1997	In 1997, with the retirement of one of St. John's most charismatic teacher and a renowned coach for the school's hockey team, Mr Vincent Fernandez, the team suffered a huge setback. His career as coach at St. John's has seen the institution become a steady supplier of national players. When he left the school field, and no doubt, still today, years after his passing, the rumblings of the underground cars could be felt by students playing on the grass above. This led to a particularly Johannian joke about the hopes of many goal bound balls thwarted by the untimely car going over speed bumps.; Also the same year, a Johannian scaled the heights of Everest. One of only two Malaysians who reached the summit, N. Mohanandas (now conferred Datuk) might not be your typical banner-waving Johannian, but his son, who studies here, carries the torch in his father's name.; On 31 March 1997, St. John's became the first school in the country to open a Smart Lab. The Smart Lab is a component of the Smart Schools project launched by a renowned Johannian and the then Minister of Education, Dato' Seri Najib Razak. During his visit, the Old Johannian (now St. John's Alumni Association) pledged RM250,000 to the school for renovation and refurbishment work.
2002	Brother Michael Wong, or "BMW St. John's Edition Auto Cruise" as he was affectionately referred to in a valedictory citation, retired at the obligatory age of 55 after serving SJI for 12 years. He was the last Brother Director in St. John's thus marking the end of the Brothers' directorship in SJI for 98 years.; Mr. Peter Yii Sing Chiu, the first lay principal from Sarawak was appointed to head SJI after Brother Michael Wong's departure.; Being a Methodist, Mr. Peter Yii Sing Chiu is considered the first non-Catholic and the first lay principal of St. John's.
2004	Datuk Seri Najib Razak, a Johannian, was appointed as the Deputy Prime Minister of Malaysia on 8 January 2004; On Friday, 20 February 2004, Brother Lawrence Spitzig received the Order of Canada. The country's highest award was presented to him by Her Excellency the Right Honourable Adrienne Clarkson, Governor General, in an investiture ceremony in Ottawa. Brother Lawrence suffered a stroke shortly after.; St. John's is 100 years old and over 100,000 children have passed through her hallowed halls. The intricate facade has been whitened to elegance, shrunken with age, hemmed in by blocks and rouged back to glory. She has stood on the hill and watched the denizens of Kuala Lumpur transform from tin mines to the cosmopolitan globalites of today. She has seen the country develop from a loose federation of states to an independent Malaysia and the formation of now Malaysia. For short, St. John's centennial birthday was celebrated with high hopes and dreams that SJI will continue to birth and nurture children for the nation.
2006	Early of October 2006, a new brick fence with the same design, motives and colour as the school's facade was constructed, complete with a guard house at the main entrance. The car park was upgraded with red interlocking tiles to match. New washroom facilities for the Form Six girls were added to the ground level of the Arts Block (popularly known as the Form 5 Block). Work was completed by January 2006, in time for the new school term.
2007	On 30 March 2007, St. John's institution (then SMK St. John) was selected as a Phase 1 Cluster School by the Ministry of Education with the vision to achieve the status of a world class cluster schools by 2015. SJI is now on the track to return to her academic glory days.
2008	"St. John Gah di Persada Dunia" is the new school cry. Many foreign school delegates visited the school, including Maldives, Australia, Ireland and Japan.; The work on upgrading and greening the school field was completed. Upgrading the school wiring system was carried out, a much needed repair after numerous and frequent blackouts caused by overloading and old wiring.
2009	St. John's receives its second lay principal, Mr. Leong Kum Loy.
2010	On 21 May 2010, St. John's is declared as a National Heritage Site by the Ministry of Culture, Arts and Heritage, Malaysia.; St. John's receives its third lay principal, Mr. Lim Hean Hwa. He is a former student of St. John's under Brother Joseph Yeoh in the 1970s.
2011	The restored tower clock on the Main Block, dedicated to the late Brother Lawrence Spitzig, was unveiled and officiated by former principal, Mr. Leong Kum Loy, in conjunction of St. John's 107th Birthday on 18 January. The project was an initiative by Megat Mizan Nicholas Denney, chairman of the Board of Governors of St. John's.
2014	St. John's receives its first non-Christian lay principal, Dr. M. Puvanendran. He was a Senior Assistant from 2005 - 2010.
2016	St. John's Institution, one of the oldest secondary schools in Kuala Lumpur, has regained its right to be known by its old name and no longer as Sekolah Menengah Kebangsaan St John.
2022	St. John's receives its first Catholic principal since 2002, Mr. Ravi Chandran a/l Krishnan.
2024	St. John's Institution celebrates its 120th birthday with a loud bang.; "St. John's 120th Anniversary, Honouring Our Past, Continuing Our Legacy" was the theme.; On 19 October, a dinner gala was hosted at MITEC. Every member of the St. John's Alumni Association was present including Ras Adiba Radzi, a Malaysian politician, community activist and veteran news presenter. The ceremony was graced by His Royal Highness, Sultan Nazrin Muizzuddin Shah ibni Almarhum Sultan Azlan Muhibbuddin Shah Al-Maghfur-Lah, Sultan of Perak.

== School History References ==
- 1953–1958, 1960: Term Review
- 1954: Golden Jubilee school magazine
- 1964: Diamond Jubilee souvenir book
- 1974: Platinum Jubilee school magazine
- 1979: 75th Anniversary commemorative book
- 1984: 80th Anniversary school magazine
- 1989: 85th Anniversary school magazine
- 1994: 90th Anniversary school magazine
- 2004: 100 Years Centennial coffee table book
- 2014: 110th Anniversary school magazine
- 2024: 120th Anniversary school magazine

== Student ==
The composition of the students is always of various races and religions, and English is the common spoken language used throughout the establishment of the school.

SJI is an all-boys school, with the exception of sixth form students where it is co-educational. Female students (better known as Eagirls) are only admitted to lower sixth form and upper sixth form in addition to male students. This is the norm for boys' secondary schools in Malaysia.

This school also has the advantages and differences of being one of the schools in Malaysia that accepts the admission of visually impaired students. It has become part of their curriculum, students with visual disabilities should attend regular class sessions like other students. The school has a Resource Room for visually impaired students where it is attended by trained teaching staff and also a club that contains a large number of students who volunteer their time to help visually impaired friends/students.

== Notable Johannians ==
- Aizat Amdan, singer and songwriter
- Zeti Akhtar Aziz, seventh Governor of Bank Negara Malaysia
- Amir Hamzah Azizan, Malaysian politician and corporate figure, currently serving as Minister of Finance II and a member of the Dewan Negara since December 2023
- Abdul Rasheed Ghaffour, tenth Governor of Bank Negara Malaysia
- Hishammuddin Hussein, Malaysian Minister of Defence
- Hans Isaac, actor, entrepreneur
- Harith Iskander, artist and stand-up comedian
- Chow Chee Keong, former national goalkeeper
- Faiz Khaleed, Military dentist, member of Angkasawan program
- William Leong, Malaysian Parliamentarian
- Abdul Ghani Minhat, national football player
- Farish A. Noor, political scientist and human rights activist
- Najib Razak, the sixth Prime Minister of Malaysia
- Nazir Razak, chairman, CIMB Group
- Nizar Najib, Member of the Pahang State Executive Council, MLA of Peramu Jaya
- Ras Adiba Radzi, Malaysian politician, community activist and veteran news presenter
- Syafiq Ridhwan, Asian Gold Medalist, World Bowling Champion
- Tengku Mohamad Rizam, Tengku Temenggong of Kelantan
- Sultan Sharafuddin Idris Shah, Sultan of Selangor
- Sultan Nazrin Muizzuddin Shah, Sultan of Perak
- Afdlin Shauki, film director
- Ikhwan Salim Sujak, Malaysian politician, corporate figure

== St. John's Photographic Archives ==
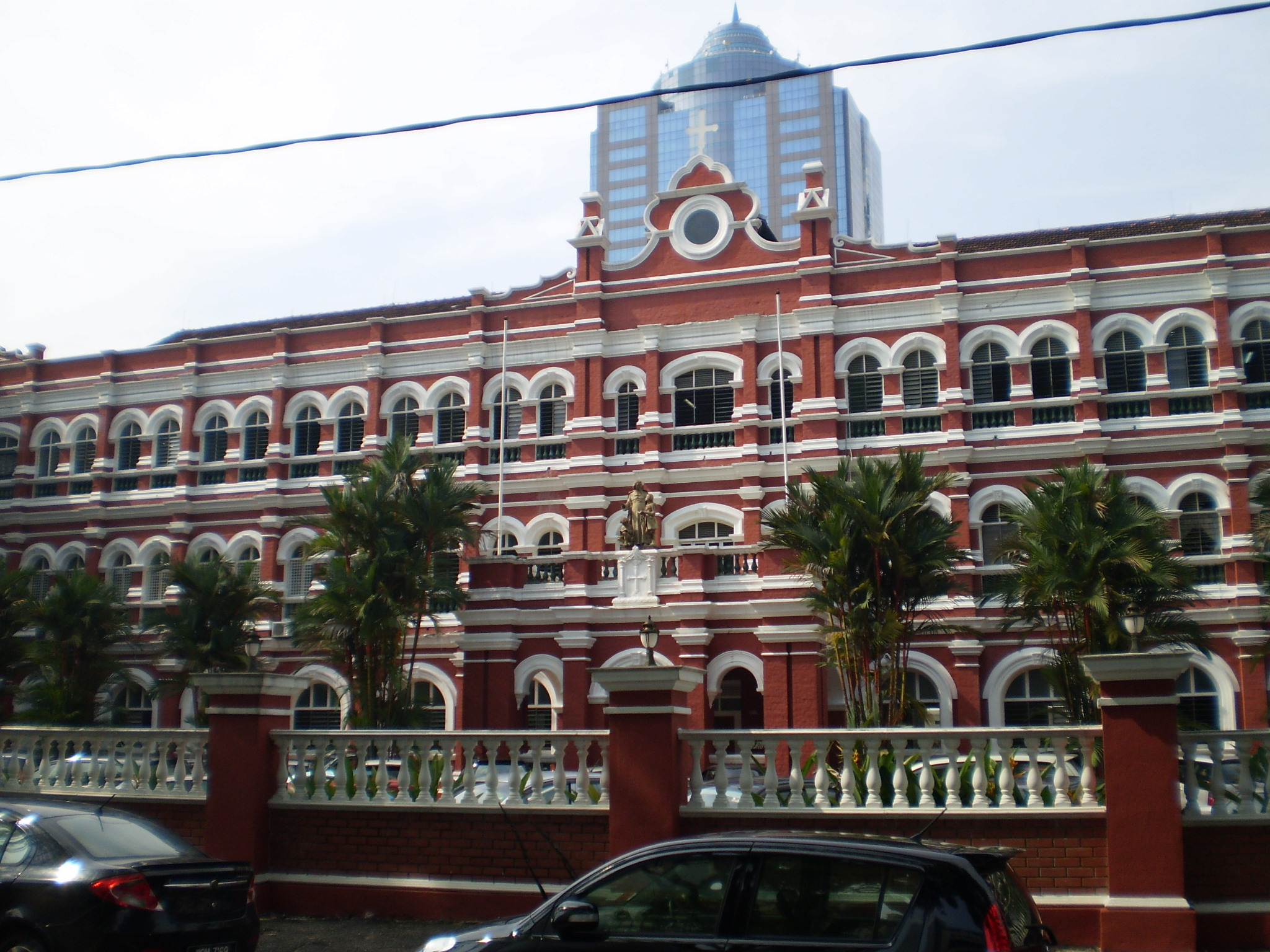
Façade of the Main Block of St. John's Institution, circa 2005-2010

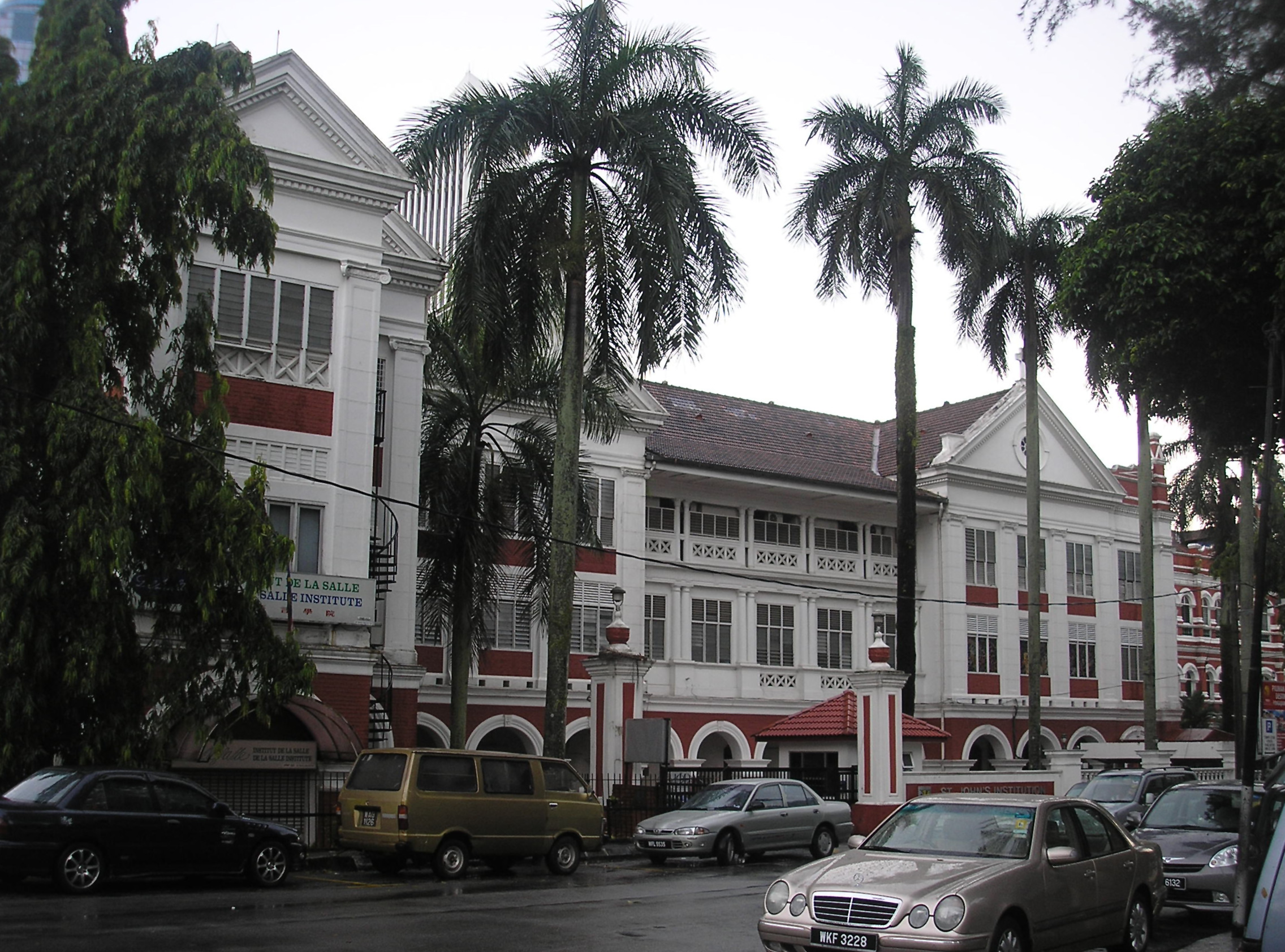
Brothers Quarters, also known as the Brothers Building, built by Bro. Director Stephen Edward Buckley and was completed in 1926. Once part of SJI now has become part of St. John's International School Photo circa 2005-2012

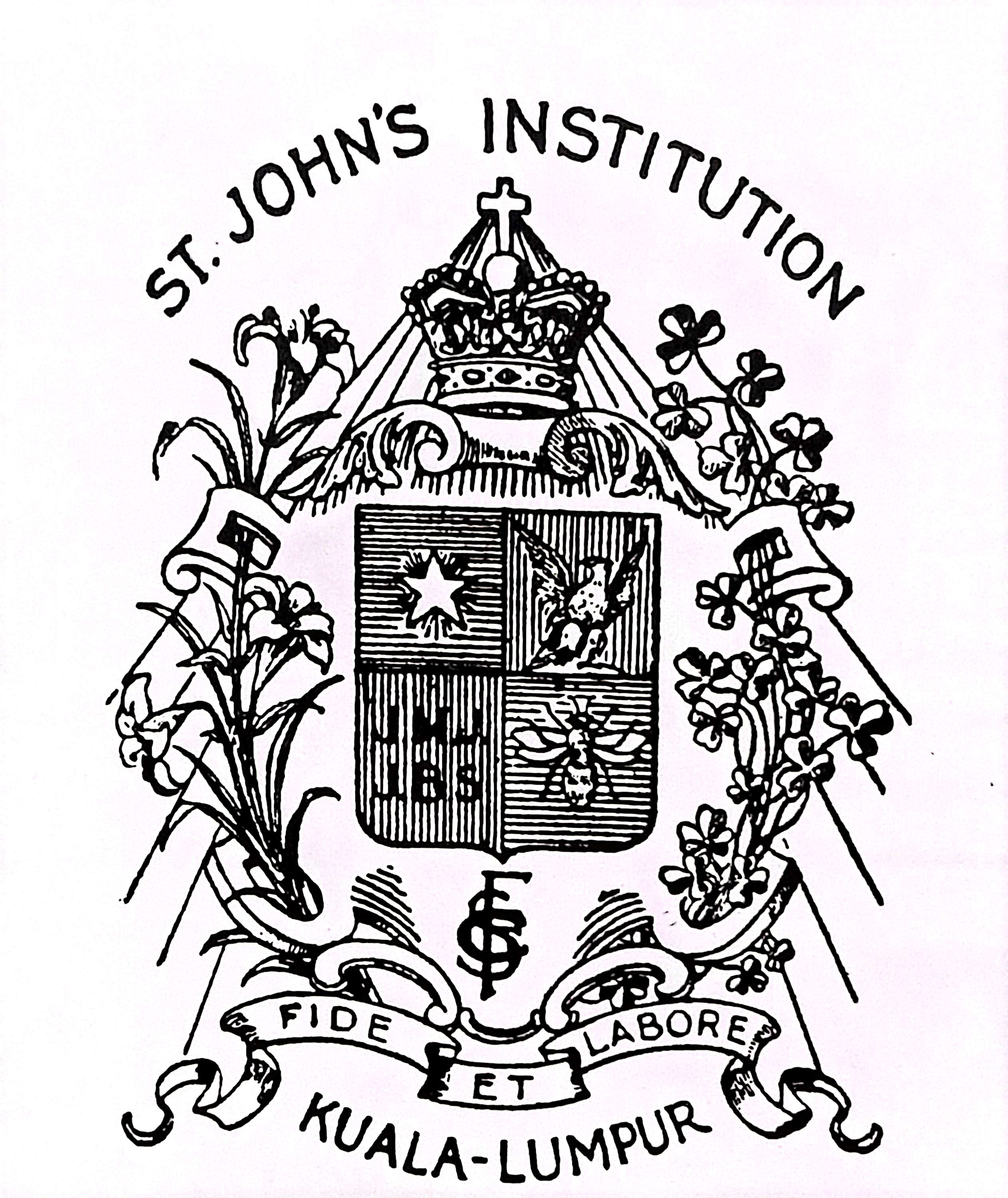
The old school badge of St. John's Institution. From the 1954 Diamond Jubilee Term Review

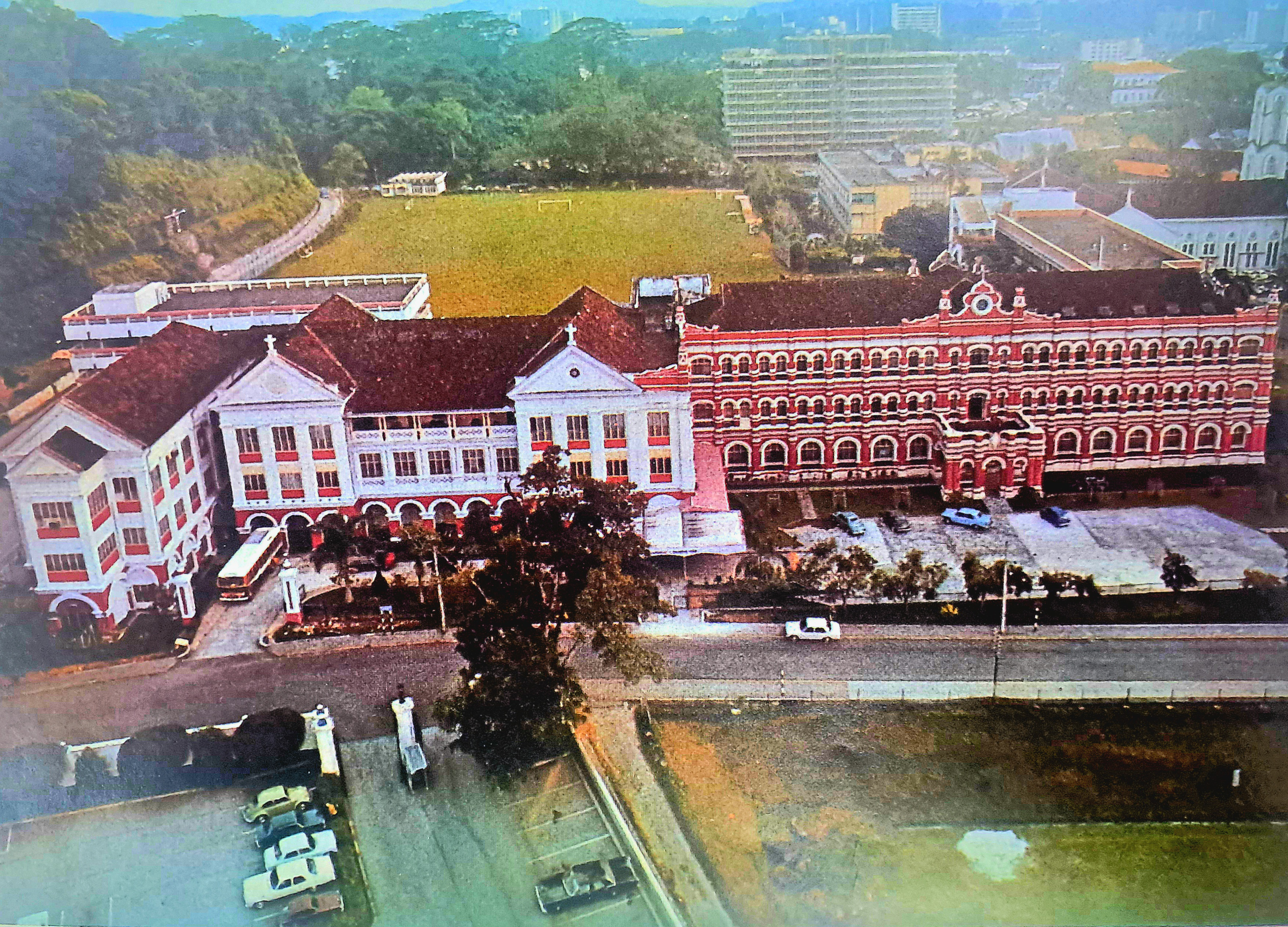
An aerial view on St. John's Institution in 1972

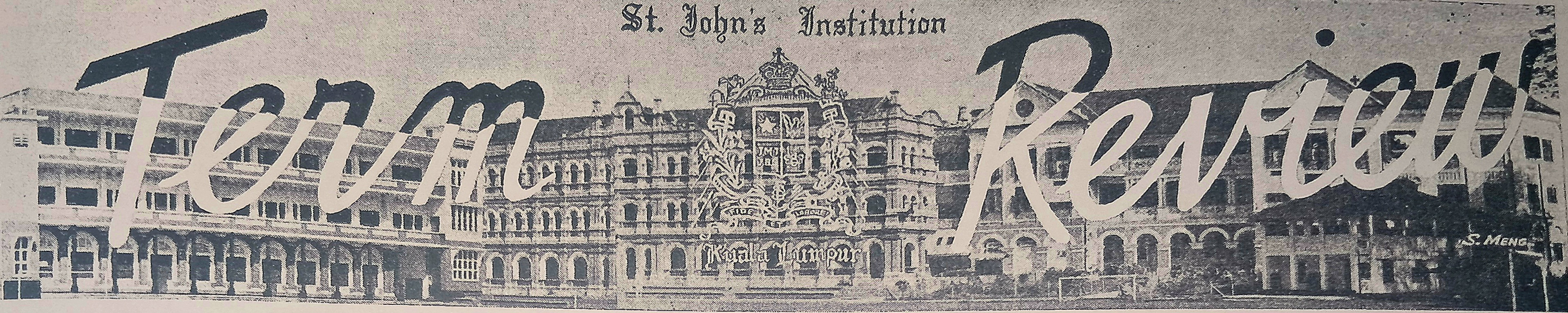
The picture shows the giant title "Term Review" with the background of the SJI's inner compound in the Second Term of 1953

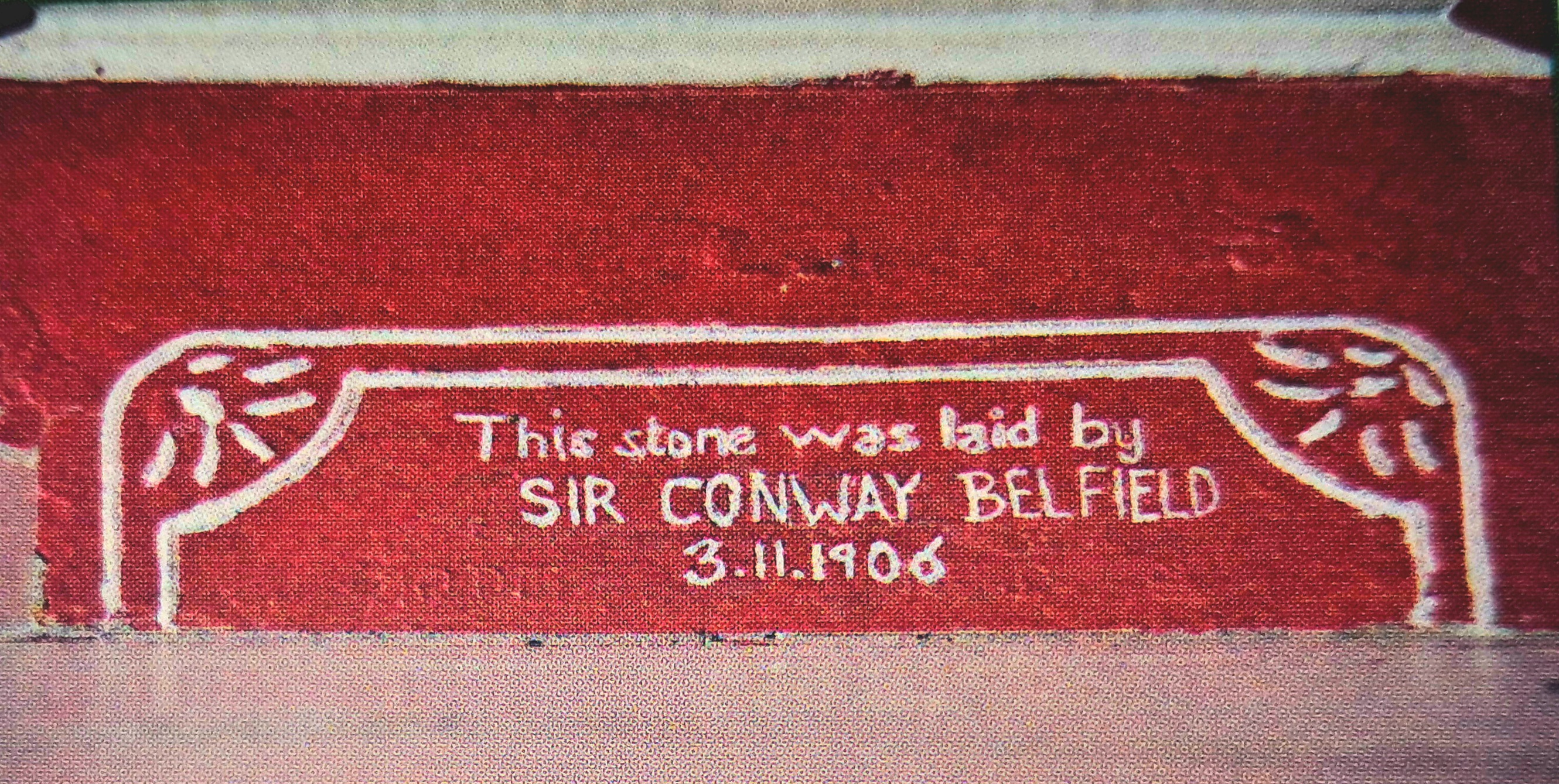
The foundation stone for the main block of St. John's Institution that was laid by Sir Henry Conway Belfield, Resident Councilor for Selangor, on 3rd November 1906.

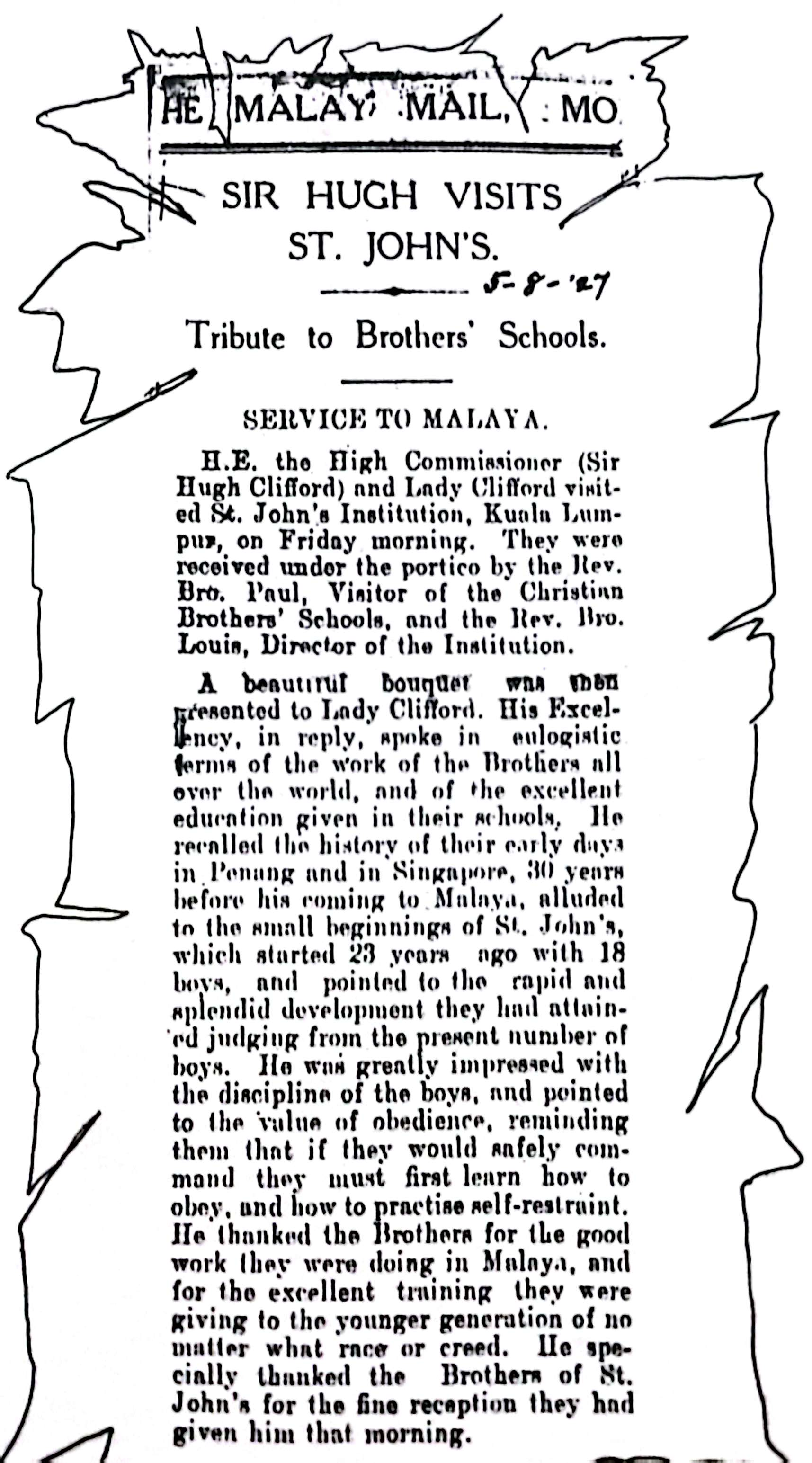
This piece is significant in the early history of St. John's Institution. Dated 5 August 1927, it tells the reader about Sir Hugh Clifford along with his wife, Lady Clifford visiting SJI that contained only 18 boys up to that period

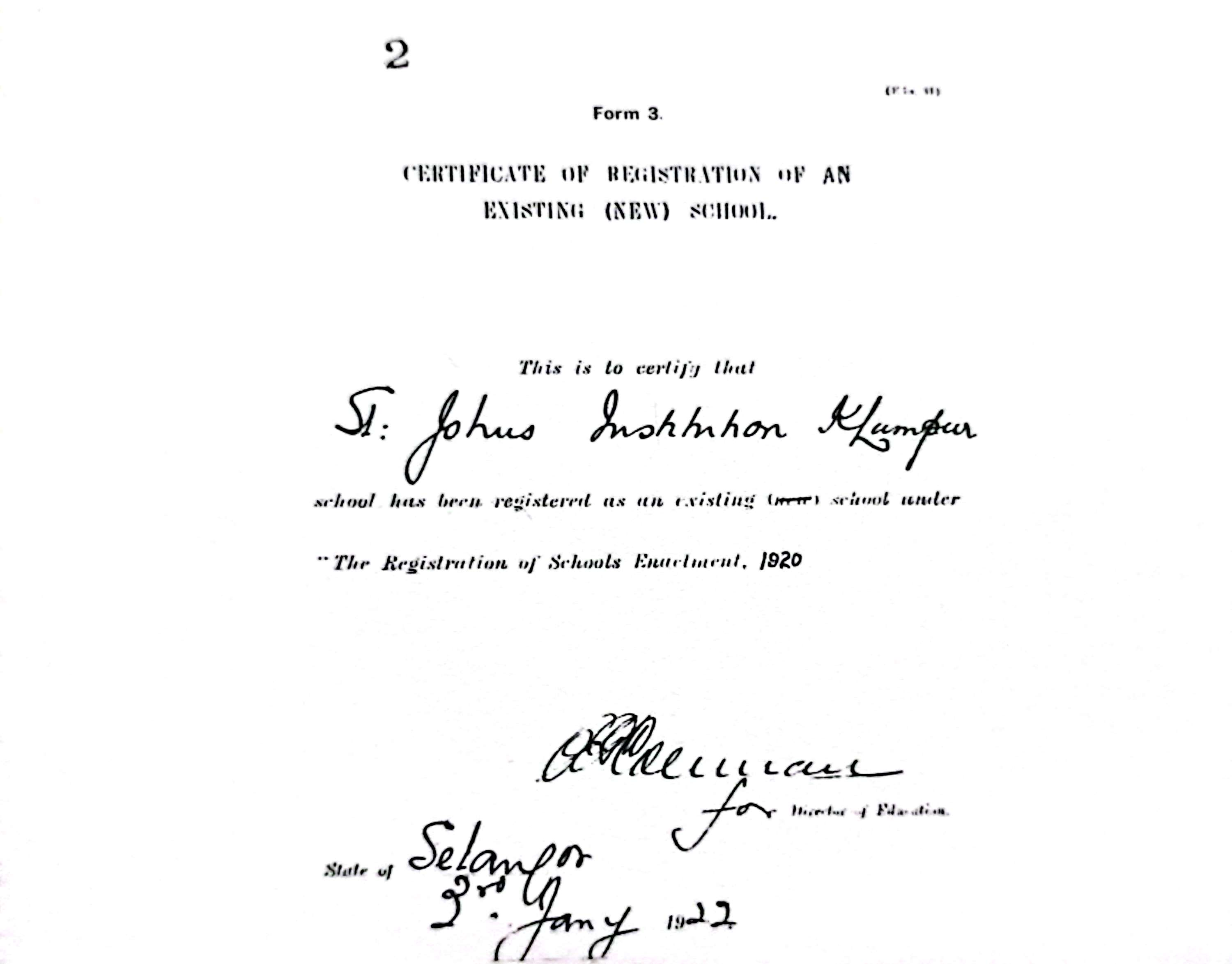
Certificate of Registration of An Existing (NEW) School under "The Registration of Schools Enactment, 1920" for St. John's Institution by the state of Selangor, signed 3rd January 1922

== See also ==
- Saint John Baptist de La Salle
- De La Salle Christian Brothers
