= SJIS =

SJIS may refer to:

- Shift JIS, a character encoding for the Japanese language
- St. John's International School (Belgium)
- Saint John's International School (Thailand)
- Saint John's International School (Malaysia)
- Sydney Japanese International School
