= La Salle School, Petaling Jaya =

La Salle School

Location
- Jalan Chantek 5/13; Petaling Jaya, Selangor Darul Ehsan, 46000; Malaysia

Information
- Other names: La Salle PJ; LSPJ
- Type: National primary and secondary school
- Motto: Sapientia Et Caritas (Wisdom and Love)
- Religious affiliation: Catholic
- Established: 1959
- Founders: De La Salle Brothers; Bro. Lawrence Spitzig
- Headmaster: En. Gunalan (Primary); Dr Premala (Secondary)
- Grades: Standard One to Form Five
- Gender: All boys
- Age range: 7 - 12 (Primary); 13 - 17 (Secondary)
- Campus type: High School
- Colours: Green, Yellow, White
- Yearbook: La Sallian
- Affiliation: Lasallian educational institutions
- Website: www.smklasallepj.edu.my

La Salle School, Petaling Jaya (simply referred to as La Salle PJ or LSPJ) is a national primary and secondary school in Petaling Jaya, Selangor, Malaysia. It was established in 1959 by the De La Salle Brothers.

The immediate aim in building this school was to ease the pressure for places in St. John's Institution, which was rapidly expanding at the time as well as cater for the needs of the growing township. Its primary and secondary schools are formally known today as Sekolah Kebangsaan La Salle Petaling Jaya and Sekolah Menengah Kebangsaan La Salle Petaling Jaya.

The school was administered by the De La Salle Brothers until 1980 for primary and 1988 for secondary. Since then, the heads have been lay individuals appointed by the Ministry of Education in consultation with the De La Salle Brothers in Malaysia.

== History ==
On 2 April 1956, Brother Lawrence Spitzig, who was then Director of St. John's, took a historic step by applying for a piece of land in Petaling Jaya on which to erect a school run by Christian brothers. The vision at that time was to acquire a ten-acre site on which to erect a primary school, with a secondary school to follow later.

As the population grew so did the pressure for places in existing schools, so on 15 July 1959, Brother Lawrence made yet another request for permission to commence work on the construction of six classrooms (now known to all PJ Lasallians as the ‘Old Block’) to house primary classes which had launched La Salle PJ on the educational scene in January 1959. A new building completed in 2003 was to replace the Old Block.

Standing in place of the Old Block is a two-storey New Block. This building houses a total of 10 classes, 2 workshops, a large surau and the long-awaited computer labs.

== The Primary School ==
=== Head Masters ===
Year service began	Year service ended	Name of Principal
1959	1959	Mr. Hew Weng Kong
1960	1962	Mr. Reggie Pereira
1962	1965	Reverend Brother Cronan Curran, FSC
1965	1972	Reverend Brother Alban Rozario, FSC
1972	1979	Reverend Brother Sebastian Leo, FSC
1979	1984	Mr. John Ng Soo Chai
1984	1999	Mr. Ng Cher Chai
1999	2001	Mdm. Yeoh Mee Ee
2002	2009	Mr. Yeo Sai Lim
2009	2014	Mr. Thillainathan S. Arumugam
2015	2017	Mdm. Teo Boon Hwa
2017	2019	Mdm. Noriah binti Mohammad
2019	2021	Mr. Tan Junhao
2021	2023	Mr. Zakaria
2023	Present	Mr. Gunalan Arumugam

- FSC - PAPZ, the group name of the De La Salle Brothers.

== The Secondary School ==
=== Principals ===
Year service began	Year service ended	Name of Principal
1963	1965	Reverend Brother Cronan Curran, FSC
1965	1967	Reverend Brother Philip Callaghan, FSC
1967	1975	Reverend Brother Lawrence Spitzig, FSC
1975	1987	Reverend Brother Felix James Donohue, FSC
1987	1992	Dr. Wong Sin Mong
1992	1999	Mdm. Hajah Ramlah Hasan
1999	2002	Mdm. Siti Nor Mohamed
2003	2008	Mr. A.Rajenthran
2009	2012	Mdm. P. Vasuthevan
2012	2015	Mdm. Chong Ah Loi
2015	2018	Mdm. Teo Boon Hwa
2019	2021	Mr. Ganapathy Bass
2021	2023	Dr. Teh Lah Hoong
2023	NOW≥	Dr. Premala Jacob

|

- FSC means [Latin: Fratres Scholarum Christianarum; French: Frères des écoles chrétiennes];English: Brothers of the Christian Schools]; a Roman Catholic religious congregation dedicated to education for all (the Last, the Least and the Lost) was founded in France by Saint Jean-Baptiste de La Salle and is now based in Rome.

== Notable alumni ==
- Syahredzan Johan, Malaysian politician and lawyer, current MP for Bangi
