= Lawrence Spitzig =

Canadian missionary

Personal life
- Born: 1917 or 1918 Toronto, Canada
- Died: 19 August 2009 (aged 91) Petaling Jaya, Malaysia

Religious life
- Religion: Christianity
- Denomination: Roman Catholicism
- Order: De La Salle Brothers

Brother Datuk Tiberius Lawrence Spitzig, CM was a LaSallian brother, who was more famous for being Brother Director of St. John's Institution, Kuala Lumpur. He served two terms as head of the institution, in 1954–1960 and 1978–1983.

== Early life ==
Born in Toronto, Ontario, Canada, Spitzig left his home country in 1937 as he always wanted to be a missionary and was influenced by the La Salle Brothers’ commitment to education. He also admits to always dreaming of teaching in a foreign country. He was a student brother when he grabbed the opportunity when there was a call for volunteers to work in South-East Asia.

== As an Educator ==
His first assignment was at Saint Joseph's Institution, Singapore in 1938 at the age of 19, before he was transferred to St. John's Institution, Kuala Lumpur (SJI) in 1941. Spitzig was teaching in SJI when the Japanese landed in Malaya during World War II. He was 20 years old then. He was arrested by the Japanese and was sent to Pudu Prison. Later he was transferred as a prisoner of war (PoW) to Changi Prison, Singapore from 1941 to 1943. According to Spitzig,

...During this time, my endeavour to survive and serve grew even stronger. I started a prison school to teach the young juveniles with disciplinary problems.

Once World War II was over and SJI reopened, Spitzig immediately resumed teaching. In 1954, he was made principal of SJI. During this time, he went all out to champion education matters. In 1956, he renovated the school and added 14 classrooms at a cost of M$90,000. Spitzig also wrote the school's famous School Rally. It was also during his time that construction of the St John’s Primary School began on the site of the Old Boys’ Club. The building could accommodate 24 classes and would cost M$220,000. The school was officially opened by Brother Fintan Blake on 16 September 1960. During the same year, the new chapel on the middle floor of SJI was officially opened and used on 19 October. At the end of 1960, he was transferred to St. Xavier's Institution, Penang, as principal.

=== La Salle School, Petaling Jaya ===
Spitzig founded La Salle School, Petaling Jaya and also eventually served as the principal of the secondary school from 1967 to 1975. On 2 April 1956, Spitzig, who was then Director of St. John's took a historic step by applying for a piece of land in Petaling Jaya on which to erect a school run by Christian brothers. The vision at that time was to acquire a ten-acre site on which to erect a primary school, with a secondary school to follow later. As the population grew so did the pressure for places in existing schools, so on 15 July 1959, Spitzig made yet another request for permission to commence work on the construction of six classrooms (now known to all PJ Lasallians as the ‘Old Block’) to house primary classes which had launched La Salle PJ on the educational scene in January 1959. A new building completed in 2003 was to replace the Old Block.

=== Second stint as Brother Director ===
In 1978, Spitzig was transferred back to SJI as director and principal. During this time, he presided over the school's Diamond Jubilee celebrations. He also re-introduced the annual English and Bahasa Malaysia public speaking competition to the school. Public speaking became part of the English and Bahasa Malaysia curriculum and was compulsory for all students. Spitzig retired as Brother Director in 1983.

== Post-retirement ==
Even after retiring as Brother Director of SJI, Spitzg continued his contributions in the education field. He has always said that his best time as an educator was in 1983, after retirement, when he became interested in schools in rural areas in Sabah. He had defied advice to visit the children who live deep inside the forest and was often driven there by volunteers in a special vehicle. According to Spitzig:

...With the help of the Franciscan Sisters, we started a one-room school as nobody wanted to come into the interior to teach the children. I don’t remember much but someone told me that the fate of the children has changed for the better since my first visit here in 1996.

== Awards and recognition ==
- Spitzig was conferred the Order of Canada, a coveted award, by the Governor-General of Canada Adrienne Clarkson in 2004 for his six decades of education service to the people of South-East Asia.
- He was conferred a Datukship by the Yang di-Pertuan Agong Tuanku Mizan Zainal Abidin in February 2009 for his many contributions to education in Malaysia.

== Death ==
Prior to his death, Spitzig was a wheelchair user and spent his retirement in the Little Sisters of the Poor Home in Cheras. Spitzig died on 18 August 2009 at 4.44pm in Assunta Hospital. His wake was held in St. John's Institution, Kuala Lumpur on 19 August while his funeral mass was held in St. John's Cathedral, Kuala Lumpur the next day.

== Notes ==
=== General references ===
- Fernandez, Charles (19 February 2009). "Bro Spitzig's commitment rewarded with awards". The Star (Malaysia). Archived from the original on 4 June 2011.
- Fernandez, Charles (20 February 2009). "An undying passion for education". The Star (Malaysia). Archived from the original on 4 June 2011.
- "Renowned missionary dies at age 91". The Star (Malaysia). 19 August 2009. Archived from the original on 22 August 2009.
