= Ras Adiba Radzi =

Appointed senator and community activist

Ras Adiba Radzi (born 27 July 1968) is a Malaysian news anchor and former politician. She has served with TV3 since 1986 where she became the country's youngest news anchor She served as a member of the Upper House from May 2020 to May 2023 and represented Persons with disabilities (OKUs). The former senator received the 2023 International Women of Courage Award, which was presented to her and other nominees by Jill Biden and Antony J. Blinken.

== Honours ==
- Federal Territory (Malaysia)
  - Commander of the Order of the Territorial Crown (PMW) – Datuk (2021)
- United States Department of State
  - International Women of Courage Award for demonstrating exceptional courage, strength, and leadership. The award ceremony hosted by the U.S. Department of state.
