= Lawrence Van Huizen =

Malaysian field hockey player (1930–2019)

Personal information
- Nationality: Malaysian
- Born: 30 July 1930
- Died: 17 August 2019 (aged 89) Seremban, Negeri Sembilan
- Relative(s): Peter van Huizen (brother), Stephen Van Huizen (son)

Sport
- Sport: Field hockey
Medal record
Men's field hockey
Representing Malaya
Asian Games
Bronze medal – third place	1962 Jakarta	Team

Lawrence Van Huizen (30 July 1930 – 17 August 2019) was a Malaysian field hockey player. He competed in the men's tournament at the 1964 Summer Olympics. He was the brother of Peter van Huizen and the father of Stephen Van Huizen.
