= Peter van Huizen =

Malaysian field hockey player (1932–2011)

Peter van Huizen (3 September 1932 – 12 September 2011) was a Malaysian field hockey player of Dutch ancestry. Born in Seremban, he attended St. Paul's Institution, Seremban where he would later coach alongside his brother Lawrence van Huizen, making them a powerhouse for local school-level football in the 80's.

He was among the 18 men who represented Malaya in hockey at the 1956 Summer Olympics in Melbourne and the 1958 Asian Games in Tokyo, doing so as a goalkeeper. Van Huizen was voted as the world's best Goalkeeper in 1956 and played football for clubs such as the Negri Sembilan Indians Association (NSIA) and Seremban Rangers. He also represented Malaysia at the 1959 SEAP Games in Bangkok.

He comes from a family of sportsmen; other than his brother Lawrence, his nephew Stephen van Huizen is also a former Malaysian international hockey player and a current coach. His grandnephew, Joel van Huizen is also a Malaysian national hockey player.

After a brief illness, van Huizen died on 12 September 2011.
