= St. John's International School (Malaysia) =

School in Kuala Lumpur, Malaysia

Coordinates: 3.1510°N 101.7002°E

- St. John's International School Lot 145, Jalan Bukit Nanas, 50250 Kuala Lumpur, Malaysia

Information
- Motto: Faith and Fortitude
- Founded: 2010
- Faculty: 34 (approx.)
- Enrollment: 1086 (approx.)
- Website: sjis.edu.my

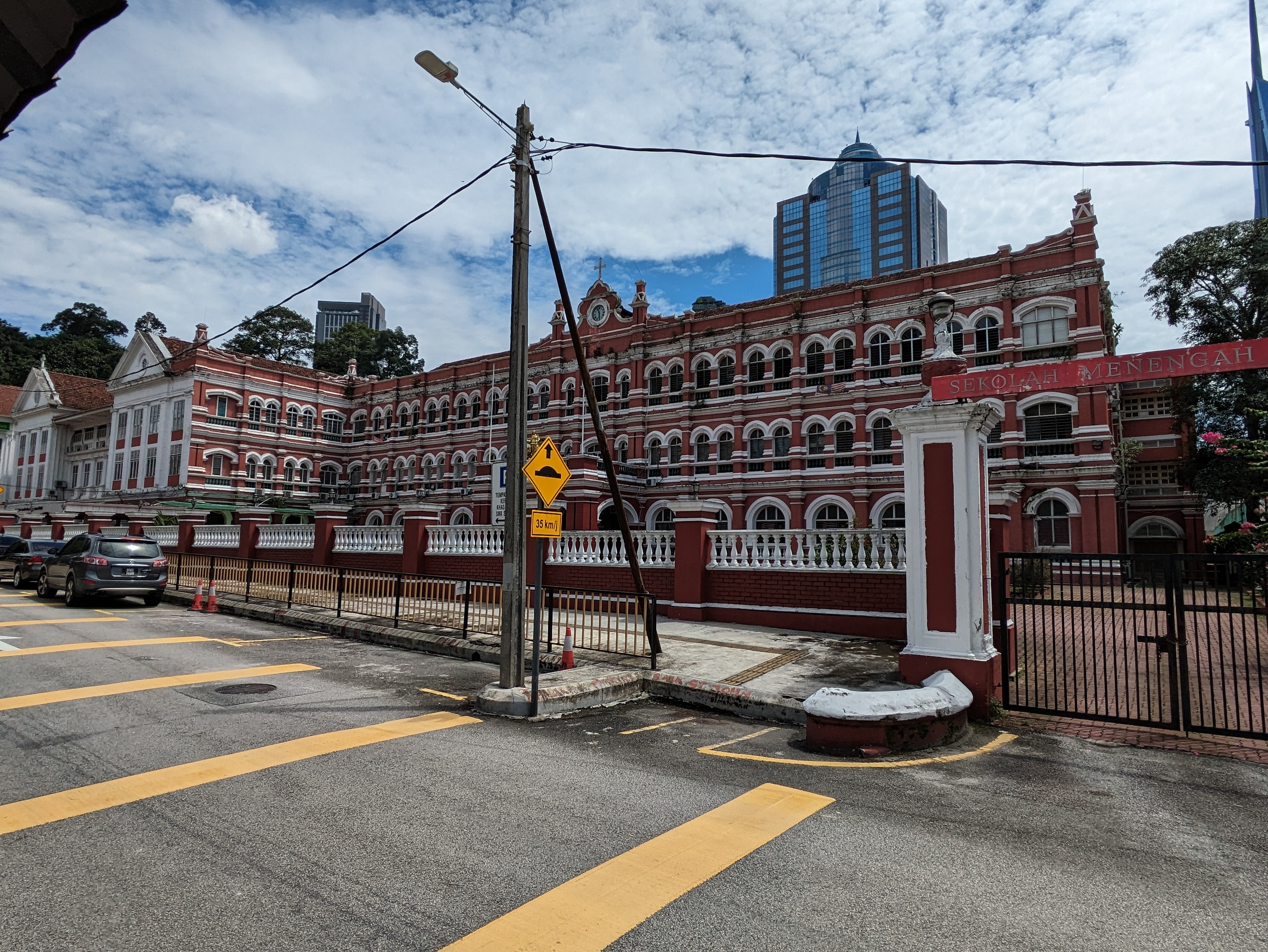

Saint John's International School (SJIS) is an international school located in Kuala Lumpur. This school is privately funded, and has collaboration with the La Salle brothers. Learning runs from lower secondary up to the A levels.

The school is located within Level 2 of the Bangunan Ming Annex, which is nearby the Masjid Jamek LRT station. The school rents the building rather than having its own constructed one.

== Admissions ==
Students must have at least 5 credits in SPM/IGCSE/GCE O Level subjects, including English. Students opting for a science subjects must have credits for science subjects at SPM/IGCSE/GCE O Level. Students opting for further mathematics courses must have a credit in additional mathematics at SPM/IGCSE/GCE O Level. They will be required to sit for a Direct English Placement test during the admission.

== Academics ==
Saint John's International School follows the Cambridge Curriculum (CAIE – Cambridge Assessment International Education), which is the international version of the British curriculum, developed by the University of Cambridge.

Students of Lower Secondary are assessed via the Lower Secondary Cambridge Checkpoint exam, which is taken in Year 9, assessing students in core subjects like English, Mathematics, and Science, providing a benchmark of their performance against international standards. In Upper Secondary (Year 10 & 11), students are assessed via the IGCSE (International General Certificate of Secondary Education) exam. Within SJIS, there is also pre-University education, or A-Levels (Advanced Level Qualification).

There are 9 subjects Lower Secondary students take:

- English
- Mathematics
- Science
- Geography
- Malay (Optional)
- ICT (Information & Communication Technology)
- History
- PE/Physical Education
- Esp

While Upper Secondary students take 9 subjects:

- English First Language and Second Language
- ICT
- Mathematics
- Biology
- Chemistry
- Physics
- Add. Mathematics (Additional Mathematics)
- Business
- Economics

Non-Malaysian students do not have to partake in the Malay subject. Moreover, ESP, or the English Support Programme, is not an extracurricular subject. Instead, it was implemented to improve students' proficiency in English grammar.

The school employs a disciplinary point system, in which each student is given a starting 25 points. Points cannot be added to a student or increased, but instead deducted from students. Once a student has had 20 points deducted, they will face suspension.

== Facilities ==
- Library (Located at Level PH, or penthouse)
- Two Science Labs (Physics, Chemistry and Biology labs, located at level 15)
- ICT labs (At Level 15)
- Student Lounge (At Level 1)
- Washrooms
- Air conditioned classrooms
- Canteen

There is no field or Futsal court present within the school, but students regularly use the field present within Sekolah Kebangsaan St. John 1 for PE (Physical Education).

Classes have a certain naming convention which is present within every class. They are named relative to their position within the building (e.g. Class 1 would be named Orion). In every class, there is one security camera. This can be accessed by the principal for any investigation/case related to said class. There are 6 names:

- Orion (Class 1, e.g. 8-Orion)
- Lynx (Class 2)
- Draco (Class 3)
- Centaurus (Class 4)
- Hercules (Class 5)
- Aquila (Class 6)
- Mensa (Class 7)

== Levels and grades ==
- Lower secondary [Year 7-9]
- Upper secondary/IGCSE [Year 10-11]
- A levels [Year 12]

== ECA/CCA ==
ECA and CCA are extra curricular lessons. ECAs are clubs, such as Robotics and Nature Club. CCAs has much examples, such as football and basketball.

SJIS has four sports houses with each having their own name to discern them from one another:

- Glasgow (red)
- Edinburgh (blue)
- Oxford (yellow)
- Cambridge (green)

There are 14 ECAs:

- Chess
- Culinary
- Art and Design
- Nature Club
- Robotics
- Interact Club
- Public Speaking and Debate Club
- Drone Technology
- Production Arts
- Photography
- Music Choir
- Music Band
- Modern Dance
- Traditional Games

There are 16 CCAs:

- Football
- Basketball
- Kickboxing
- Karate
- Taekwondo
- Badminton
- Tennis
- Cheerleading
- Squash
- Waterpolo
- Swimming
- Table Tennis
- Handball
- Gymnastium
- Netball
- Pickle Ball
