= Vijayaratnam Seevaratnam =

Malaysian politician

Yang Berbahagia Dato' Vijayaratnam Seevaratnam DSNS KMN ANS PJK JP

Vice-President of Parti Gerakan Rakyat Malaysia
- In office 2005–2008

Ministerial roles
- 2005–2008: Parliamentary Secretary of Plantation Industries and Commodities

Faction represented in Dewan Negara
- 2005–2008: Barisan Nasional

Personal details
- Born: 12 June 1950 Seremban, Negeri Sembilan, Federation of Malaya
- Died: 3 November 2008 (aged 58) Seremban, Negeri Sembilan, Malaysia
- Spouse: Anucia Tharumaratnam
- Children: 4
- Parents: S.Seeveratnam (father); Vijayalakshimi (mother)
- Profession: Medical doctor

Vijayaratnam s/o Seevaratnam (12 June 1950 – 3 November 2008) was a Malaysian politician of Ceylonese-Indian descent and one of the vice-presidents of the Parti Gerakan Rakyat Malaysia (PGRM) from 2005 to 2008.

== Biography ==
His father, S. Seeveratnam was Seremban Barat Member of Parliament (DAP), and his uncle, S. Rajaratnam served as Minister for Culture, Minister for Labour, Foreign Minister, Deputy Prime Minister and Senior Minister of Singapore. Vijayaratnam studied in Saint Paul's Institution. He was married to Datin Anuncia Tharumaratnam and had four children. From 1997 to 1999, he was a member of the Seremban Municipal Council. In 2002, he became a Malaysian senator and later in 2005, he became Parliamentary Secretary for the Plantation Industries and Commodities Ministry. He was also PGRM International Affairs and Ethnic Relations Bureau chairman and SLC, Negeri Sembilan Vice-Chairman, Sunngai Ujong Branch chairman. Besides political offices he was also an involved with a number of professional and social bodies. He was a Fellow of the Royal Society for the Promotion of Health in London, England. In 1999, he was made an Honorary Fellow of the Indian College of General Practitioners of New Delhi, and in 2007 he was made a Fellow of Faculty of Occupational Medicine, Royal College of Physicians, of Ireland.

He was a life member of the Malaysian Medical Association.

He died accidentally after falling from the roof of his clinic building in Jalan Tunku Hassan, Seremban.

== Honours ==
- Malaysia
  - Officer of the Order of the Defender of the Realm (KMN) (1999)
- Negeri Sembilan
  - Knight Companion of the Order of Loyalty to Negeri Sembilan (DSNS) – Dato' (2000)
  - Member of the Order of Loyalty to Negeri Sembilan (ANS) (1991)
  - Recipient of the Meritorious Service Medal (PJK) (1988)
  - Justice of the Peace (JP) (1994)
