= Stephen Van Huizen =

Malaysian field hockey player (born 1958)

Personal information
- Nationality: Malaysian
- Born: 1 September 1958 (age 67)
- Relative(s): Lawrence Van Huizen (father), Peter van Huizen (uncle)

Sport
- Sport: Field hockey
Medal record
Men's field hockey
Representing Malaysia
Asian Games
Bronze medal – third place	1982 New Delhi	Team

Stephen Van Huizen (born 1 September 1958) is a Malaysian field hockey player. He competed in the men's tournament at the 1984 Summer Olympics. He is the son of Lawrence Van Huizen and the nephew of Peter van Huizen, both too known for their role in Malaysian field hockey.
