= De La Salle College =

De La Salle College may refer to:

== Australia ==
=== New South Wales ===
- De La Salle College Ashfield, Sydney
- De La Salle College Caringbah, Sydney
- De La Salle College, Cronulla, Sydney
- De La Salle College, Orange, closed in 1977
- De La Salle College, Revesby Heights, Sydney
- O'Connor Catholic College in Armidale, formerly De La Salle College Armidale

=== Other states ===
- De La Salle College, Malvern, Melbourne, Victoria
- Southern Cross Catholic College in Redcliffe, Queensland, formerly De La Salle College, Redcliffe

== Ireland ==
- De La Salle College Ballyshannon, County Donegal
- De La Salle College Waterford, County Waterford
- De La Salle College Churchtown, Dublin
- De La Salle College Dundalk, County Louth

== Philippines ==
- De La Salle University, known as De La Salle College until 1975, Manila
- De La Salle–College of Saint Benilde, Manila

== United Kingdom ==
- De La Salle College, Jersey, St Saviour, Jersey
- De La Salle College of Higher Education, former name of Hopwood Hall College, Middleton, England
- De La Salle College, Belfast, Northern Ireland
- De La Salle College, Salford, former name of Pendleton College in Salford, England

== Other countries ==
- De La Salle College (Toronto), Ontario, Canada
- De La Salle Frere, Amman, Jordan
- De La Salle College (Malta), Birgu, Malta
- De La Salle College, Mangere East, Auckland, New Zealand
- De La Salle College, Colombo, Sri Lanka

== See also ==
- De La Salle (disambiguation)
- De La Salle Academy (disambiguation)
- De La Salle School (disambiguation)
- De La Salle High School (disambiguation)
- La Salle (disambiguation)
- La Salle College (disambiguation)
- La Salle High School (disambiguation)
- La Salle University (disambiguation)
- Lasallian educational institutions
