= La Salle University (disambiguation) =

La Salle University is a private, Catholic university in Philadelphia, Pennsylvania.

La Salle University or De La Salle University may also refer to:

== Brazil ==
- Universidade La Salle, a university in Canoas, Rio Grande do Sul

== Colombia ==
- La Salle University, Colombia, based in Bogotá

== Indonesia ==
- De La Salle Catholic University Manado

== Mexico ==
- Universidad La Salle México, based in Mexico City
  - La Salle University of Chihuahua, a campus in Chihuahua, Chihuahua

== Philippines ==
- De La Salle Araneta University, in Malabon
- De La Salle University, in Malate, Manila
- De La Salle University – Dasmariñas, in Dasmariñas
- La Salle University (Ozamiz), in Ozamiz
- University of St. La Salle, in Bacolod

== United States ==
- La Salle Extension University, a former correspondence/distance learning school in Chicago, Illinois
- LaSalle University, a defunct James Kirk diploma mill

== See also ==
- La Salle College (disambiguation)
- La Sallian educational institutions
- La Salle High School (disambiguation)
- La Salle (disambiguation)
- De La Salle Academy (disambiguation)
- De La Salle High School (disambiguation)
- De La Salle College (disambiguation)
- De La Salle (disambiguation)
