= De La Salle Academy =

De La Salle Academy may refer to:

- De La Salle Academy, a secondary school in Liverpool, England which is now Dixons Croxteth Academy
- De La Salle Academy, a name associated with De La Salle College (Toronto)
- De La Salle Academy, a name associated with La Salle Academy

== See also ==
- La Salle Academy
- La Sallian educational institutions
- De La Salle College (disambiguation)
- La Salle High School (disambiguation)
- De La Salle High School (disambiguation)
- De La Salle (disambiguation)
- La Salle (disambiguation)
