= La Salle College (disambiguation) =

La Salle College is a boys' secondary school in Hong Kong.

La Salle College or LaSalle College may also refer to:

- La Salle College (Buenos Aires), Argentina
- La Salle College, Perth, Australia
- La Salle College of Lucas do Rio Verde, Brazil
- LaSalle College Vancouver, British Columbia, Canada
- LaSalle College, Montreal, Quebec, Canada
- La Salle College–Victorias, Philippines
- La Salle College Antipolo, Philippines
- Lasalle College of the Arts, Singapore
- La Salle College Preparatory, Pasadena, California, US
- La Salle College High School, Wyndmoor, Pennsylvania, US

== See also ==
- De La Salle College (disambiguation)
- De La Salle High School (disambiguation)
- La Salle University (disambiguation)
- La Salle (disambiguation)
