= Agase =

Agase is a surname. Notable people with the surname include:

- Alex Agase (1922–2007), American footballer and coach
- Lou Agase (1924–2006), American footballer and coach
