= De La Salle =

De La Salle may refer to:

== People ==
- De La Salle (surname); in particular
  - Jean-Baptiste de la Salle (1651–1719), French Catholic priest and educational reformer
  - René-Robert Cavelier, Sieur de La Salle (1643–1687), French explorer and fur trader in North America
- De La Salle Va'a (born 2005), American Samoan–Australian rugby league footballer

== Education ==
- De La Salle Brothers, a Catholic lay religious congregation for men founded in France by Jean-Baptiste de La Salle
- Lasallian educational institutions, affiliated with the De La Salle Brothers (many listed at that article)
- De La Salle Academy (disambiguation)
- De La Salle College (disambiguation)
- De La Salle High School (disambiguation)
- De La Salle School (disambiguation)
- De La Salle University, Manila, Philippines
- École secondaire publique De La Salle, Ottawa, Canada

== Other uses ==
- De La Salle GAA, a sports club in Waterford, Ireland
- De la Salle (Mexico City Metrobús), a BRT station in Mexico City

== See also ==
- La Salle (disambiguation)
