= Marshall McLuhan Catholic Secondary School =

Catholic high school in Toronto, Canada

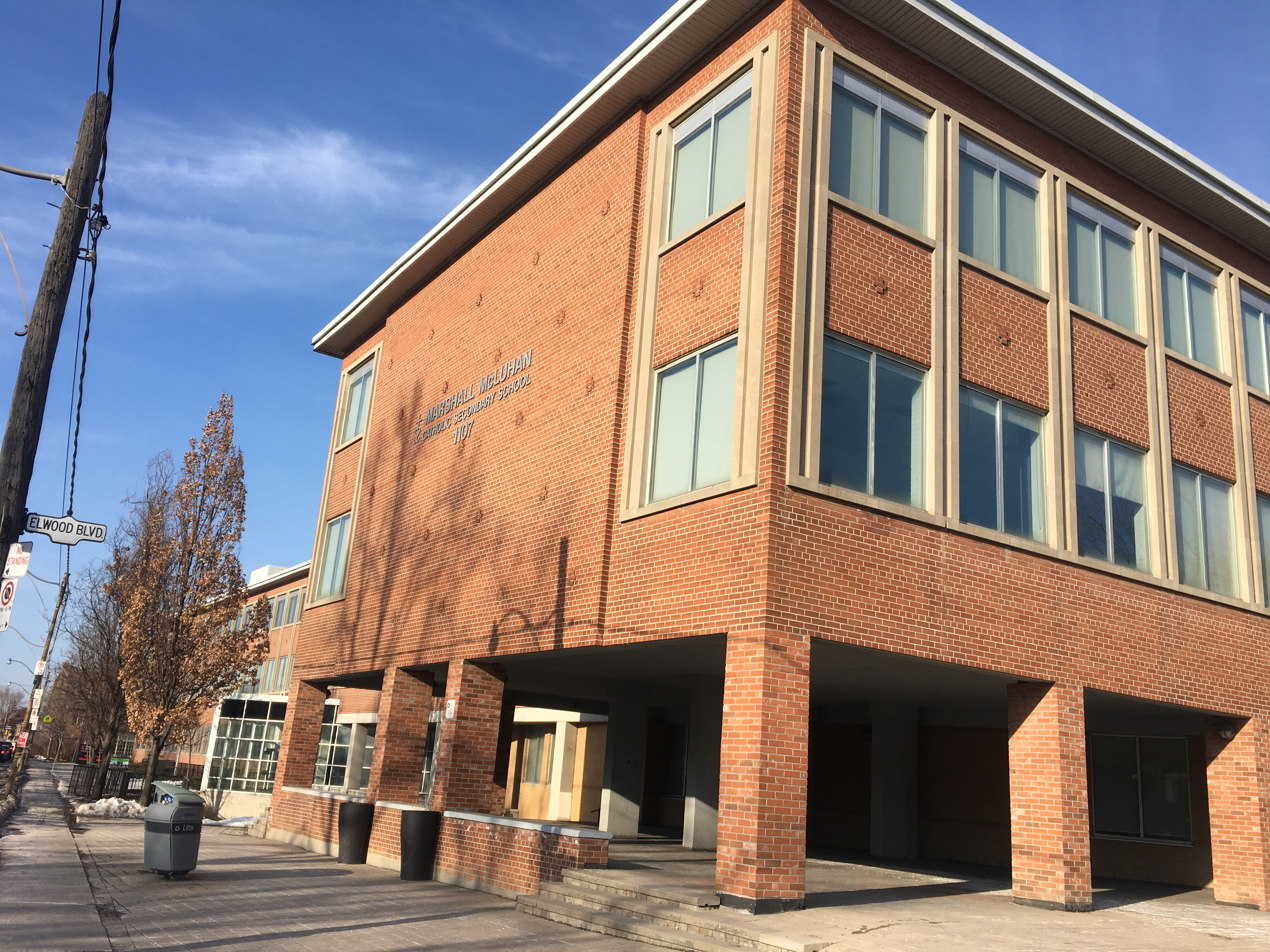

Location
- 1107 Avenue Road; Midtown, Toronto, Ontario, M5N 3B1; Canada; 43.7076°N 79.4095°W

Information
- School type: Catholic High school
- Motto: Faith Is Our Medium
- Religious affiliation: Roman Catholic
- Founded: 1998
- School board: Toronto Catholic District School Board
- Superintendent: Shawna Campbell; Area 3
- Area trustee: Maria Rizzo; Ward 5
- School number: 561 / 730653
- Principal: Robert Noble
- CSAC Chair: Diana Rojas (2019-22)
- Faculty: 65
- Grades: 9-12 (non-semestered)
- Enrolment: 1,080 (2017-18)
- Campus: Urban
- Colours: Grey, Navy, White, Green
- Mascot: Moose
- Team name: McLuhan Rebels
- Parish: St. Monica's Church
- Specialist High Skills Major: Information & Communication Technology; Non-Profit; Sports
- Program Focus: Advanced Placement; Extended French; Gifted; Cyber Arts
- Website: www.tcdsb.org/o/marshallmcluhan/

Marshall McLuhan Catholic Secondary School (Marshall McLuhan, MMCSS, Marshall McLuhan CSS, or McLuhan) is a coeducational, non-semestered, Catholic high school in midtown Toronto, Ontario, Canada managed by the Toronto Catholic District School Board. The school was formally founded in September 1998 to replace De La Salle College Oaklands campus, founded by the De La Salle Brothers in 1851, which was reverted as a private school in 1994. The school property was originally built for the Toronto Hunt Club and later used by the Canadian Armed Forces as the Canadian Forces Staff School until 1994.

This school was named after Marshall McLuhan, a Canadian educator, philosopher, and scholar—a professor of English literature, a literary critic, a rhetorician, a communication theorist, and a committed Roman Catholic. McLuhan is located on Avenue Road north of Eglinton Avenue West and is accessible from Eglinton station. Its motto is "Faith is our medium".

To fill in the void with De La Salle's re-privatization, the school board began the process to replace De La Salle. In 1995, the MSSB acquired the 2.7 hectare Canadian Forces Staff School although the homeowners were worried to see their homes expropriated.

== See also ==
- Education in Ontario
- List of secondary schools in Ontario
