= Nobby Wirkowski =

American gridiron football player and coach (1926–2014)

Profile
- Position: Quarterback

Personal information
- Born: August 20, 1926; Chicago, Illinois, U.S.
- Died: October 15, 2014 (aged 88); Mississauga, Ontario, Canada
- Listed height: 5 ft 10 in (1.78 m)
- Listed weight: 175 lb (79 kg)

Career information
- University: Miami (OH)

Career history

Playing
- 1951–1954: Toronto Argonauts
- 1955–1956: Hamilton Tiger-Cats
- 1956–1959: Calgary Stampeders
- 1960: Toronto Argonauts

Coaching
- 1952–1957: De La Salle College (HC)
- 1960–1962: Toronto Argonauts (AC)
- 1962–1964: Toronto Argonauts (HC)
- 1968–1975: York University (HC)
- 1984: York University (AC)
- 1987: York University (AC)
- 1988–1989: York University (HC)

Operations
- 1965–1967: Toronto Argonauts (DPP)
- 1968–1992: York University (AD)

Awards and highlights
- Grey Cup champion (1952)

Norbert "Nobby" Wirkowski (August 20, 1926 – October 15, 2014) was an American and Canadian football player and coach. He is best known as quarterback of the Toronto Argonauts. The touchdown he engineered in the 1952 Grey Cup turned out to be the last offensive touchdown by the Argonauts in a Grey Cup for 30 years.

Born and raised in Chicago, Illinois, he excelled in athletics and became the first athlete at Crane Technical High School to letter in 3 sports (football, basketball, and baseball) since George Halas accomplished the feat at the turn of the century.

Wirkowski played for two exceptional football coaches while attending Miami University. He started under Sid Gillman, whose ideas revolutionized the passing game in American football, and when Gillman left, Woody Hayes replaced him. Wirkowski led Miami to a 13–12 victory over Texas Tech in the 1948 Sun Bowl and then 3 years later put on a spectacular performance in the Salad Bowl. In that game Nobby completed 18 of 21 pass attempts, leading Miami past Arizona State. While at Miami, Wirkowski became a member of the Phi Kappa Tau fraternity.

After college, he joined the Toronto Argonauts and took over the quarterbacking spot for Toronto, leading the Argonauts to a 7–5 record in the 1951 season. In 1952, Wirkowski led Toronto to a Grey Cup championship over the Edmonton Eskimos.

From 1952 to 1957, Wirkowski coached the senior football team at De La Salle College (Toronto) which won consecutive league championships in 1955, 1956 and 1957.

He was traded to Hamilton in 1955 where he played for two years and was then traded to Calgary. At the end of the 1959 season he returned to Toronto as back-up quarterback and assistant coach. The following year Nobby saw his final action as a professional player when he injured his knee in a preseason exhibition game with the NFL St. Louis Cardinals.

In 1963, Argonauts General Manager Lew Hayman promoted Wirkowski to the head coaching position after Lou Agase was fired. He served as the Argonauts head coach through the 1964 season, after which he was promoted to Director of Player Personnel. He served in that role through the 1967 season.

After the 1967 season Wirkowski was approached by York University. York was looking at starting a football program and needed a coach who could build a team 'from scratch.' He accepted the offer from York and was named Athletic Director and Head football coach and joined the Faculty of Physical Education as a professor. He coached York from 1968 to 1975 and from 1988 to 1989, and was an associate coach for the 1984 and 1987 seasons.

He is a member of the Miami University Athletic Hall of Fame and the Mississauga Hall of Fame.

On October 15, 2014, Wirkowski died with his family at his side at the age of 88.
