= La Salle =

La Salle, LaSalle or Lasalle is part of the names of two men born in 17th century France, Jean-Baptiste de La Salle and René-Robert Cavelier, Sieur de La Salle, for whom many places and things are named:

== Places ==
=== Canada ===
- La Salle, Manitoba
- Ontario
  - LaSalle, Ontario, a municipality in Essex County
  - La Salle Township, Ontario, a geographic township in Nipissing District
- Quebec
  - LaSalle, Quebec, a borough of Montreal
  - LaSalle Boulevard, a thoroughfare in Montreal
  - LaSalle—Émard, a federal electoral district in Quebec
  - Lasalle (electoral district), a former electoral district in Quebec

=== France ===
- Lasalle, Gard
- La Salle, Saône-et-Loire
- La Salle, Vosges
- La Salle-de-Vihiers, in the Maine-et-Loire department
- La Salle-en-Beaumont, in the Isère department
- La Salle-et-Chapelle-Aubry, in the Maine-et-Loire department
- La Salle-les-Alpes, in the Hautes-Alpes department
- La Salle-Prunet, in the Lozère department

=== Haiti ===
- La Salle, Haiti, a rural village in the Pestel commune

=== Hong Kong ===
- La Salle Road, a road in Hong Kong

=== Italy ===
- La Salle, Aosta Valley

=== Thailand ===
- La Salle road, officially known as soi Sukhumvit 105

=== United States ===
- LaSalle, Colorado
- LaSalle, Illinois
- La Salle, Minnesota
- La Salle, Texas (disambiguation), multiple locations
- LaSalle County, Illinois
- La Salle County, Texas
- LaSalle Parish, Louisiana
- LaSalle Park, a neighborhood of St. Louis, Missouri
- LaSalle Street, Chicago, Illinois
- La Salle Township (disambiguation)

== Education ==
- Educational institutions affiliated with the Institute of the Brothers of the Christian Schools
- Lasallian educational institutions, including a list of schools worldwide
- La Salle High School (disambiguation), including La Salle School
- La Salle University (disambiguation)

== Transportation ==
- LaSalle, a former train which operated on the current route of the Hiawatha (Amtrak train), which operates between Chicago and Milwaukee
- LaSalle Expressway, an expressway in Niagara Falls, New York, United States
- LaSalle station (disambiguation), or La Salle station

== Other uses ==
- LaSalle (automobile), an American luxury car brand
- La Salle (surname)
- Lasalle & Koch, sometimes called Lasalle's, a defunct department store in Toledo, Ohio
- LaSalle Bank
- LaSalle's invariance principle
- LaSalle Records, a division of Atlantic Records
- La Salle Theater (Chicago)
- USS La Salle (AGF-3)
- USS La Salle (AP-102)

== See also ==
- LaSalle Hotel (disambiguation)
- De La Salle (disambiguation)
- Laksa, a food item, homophonous to "lasalle" in some Asian languages
- Salle (disambiguation)
