= La Salle, Texas =

La Salle, Texas may refer to:

- La Salle, Jackson County, Texas, an unincorporated community
- La Salle, La Salle County, Texas, a former community, absorbed into Cotulla
- La Salle, Limestone County, Texas, a former community on Farm to Market Road 1953

== See also ==
- La Salle County, Texas
- La Salle (disambiguation)
