= Canadian Forces College =

Senior military college Canada

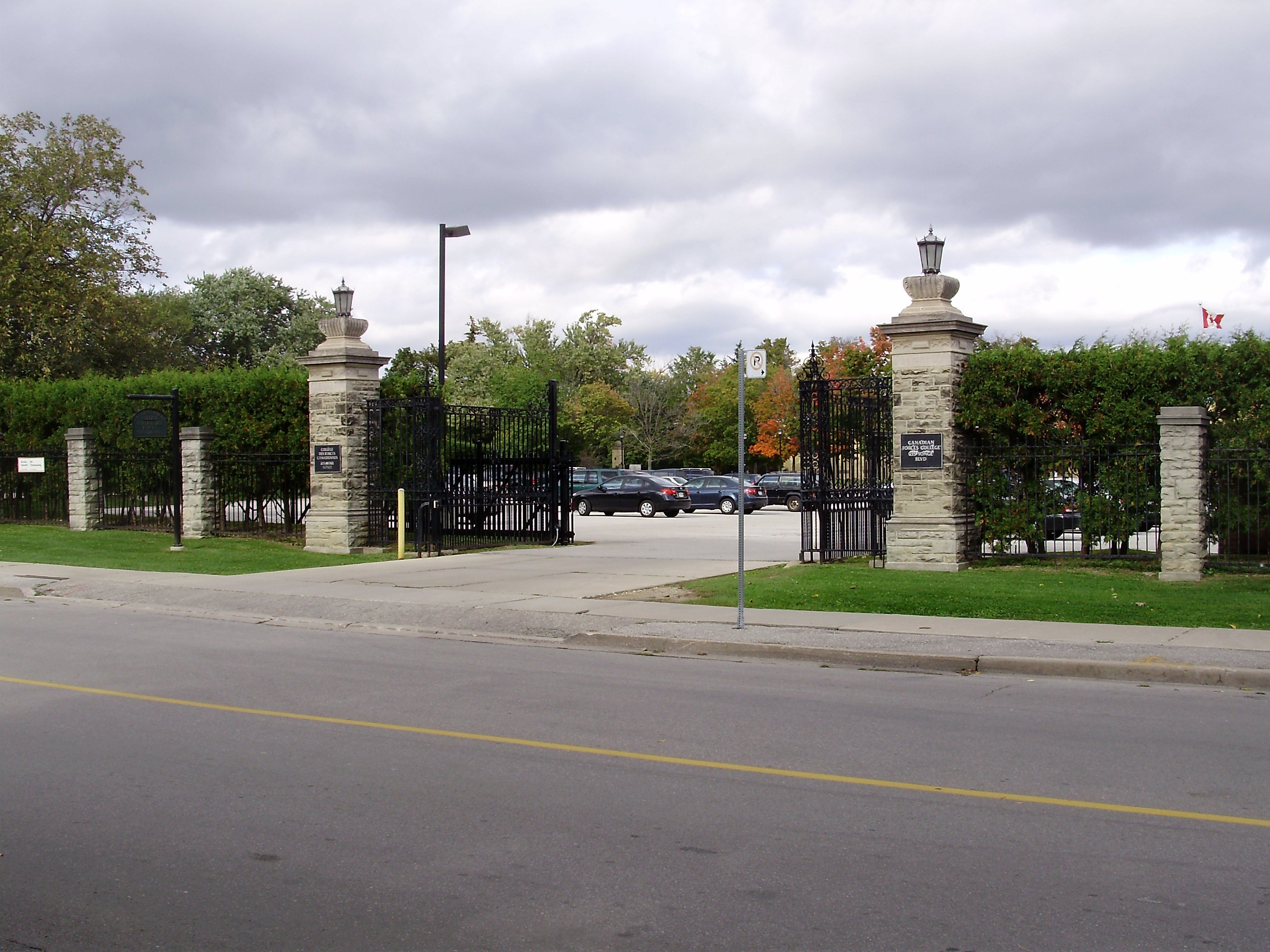
- Entry gates to the CFC campus
- Type: Staff college
- Established: 1943 (as the Royal Canadian Air Force War Staff College)
- Affiliations: RMC PPC, DRDC, OCGS
- Location: Toronto, Ontario, Canada; 43.742°N 79.414°W
- Website: cfc.forces.gc.ca

The Canadian Forces College (CFC) is a military staff college for senior and general officers of the Canadian Armed Forces. It provides graduate-level military education courses designed to develop leadership abilities within the Canadian Forces in a whole-of-government framework. The CFC campus is located at 215 Yonge Boulevard, on the north side of Wilson Avenue in the Armour Heights neighborhood of Toronto, Ontario.

== History ==
The institution was established in 1943 as the Royal Canadian Air Force War Staff College. The site was originally a property named Strathrobyn that was owned by real estate developer Frederick Burton Robins (1866–1948), and the centrepiece was a large Tudor Revival mansion which was built around 1914 pursuant to a design by the architectural firm of George & Moorhouse. The estate was renamed as Glenalton after it was purchased in 1926 for $175,000 by businessman Albert Leroy Ellsworth (1876–1950), who had founded the British American Oil Company in 1906. Ellsworth used the property as his residence until about 1942, at which point the Royal Canadian Air Force rented it from him to use as a wartime staff college. In the autumn of 1945, the Government of Canada bought the estate from Ellsworth for $103,500.

In 1945, the college was re-designated as the Royal Canadian Air Force Staff College, which became a component of the Air Force College in 1962. The Air Force College also included a Headquarters, a Staff School and an Extension School. Following integration of the Canadian Armed Forces, the college was renamed as the Canadian Forces College (CFC) in 1966. The Tudor Revival mansion containing the Officers' Mess was designated a "Recognized Federal Heritage Building" by the Canadian government in 1991.

The Canadian Forces Staff School for junior officers, formerly located at 1107 Avenue Road, was determined to be redundant and closed in 1994. That property was later sold to the Metropolitan Separate School Board (now called the Toronto Catholic District School Board), and it re-opened in 1998 as Marshall McLuhan Catholic Secondary School.

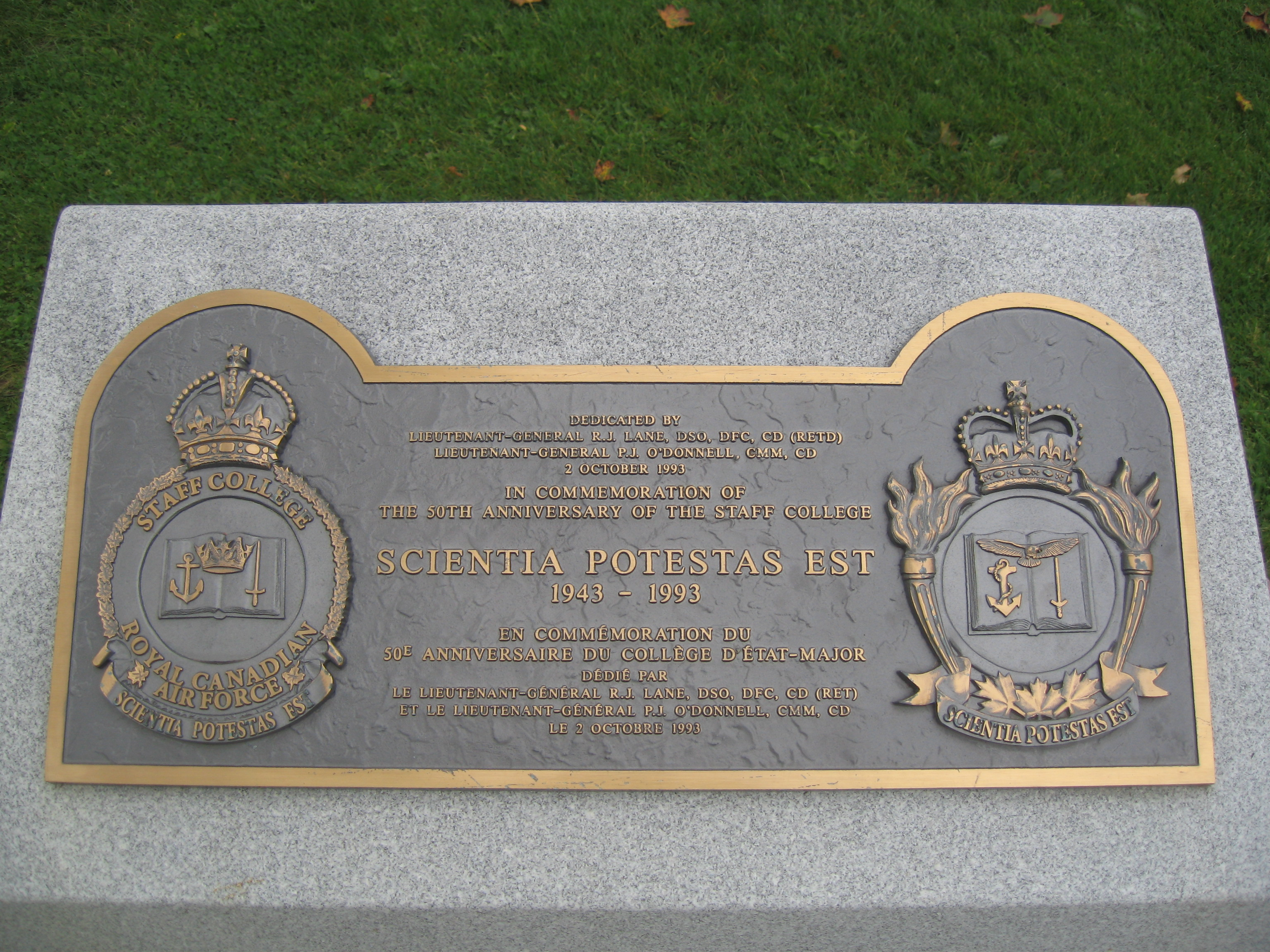
Commemoration memorial of the Canadian Forces College

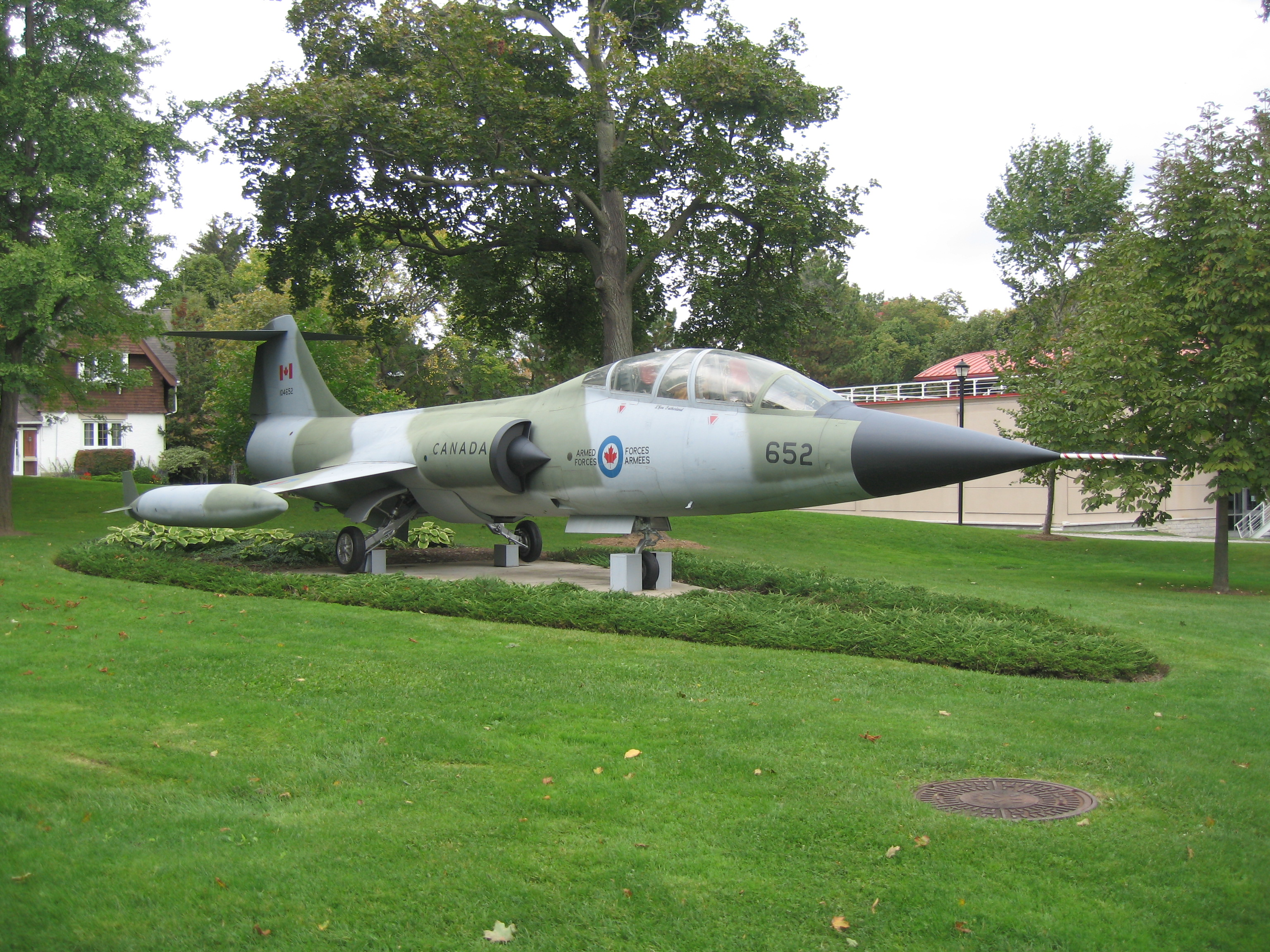
The Canadian Forces College's ex-AETE CF-104 Starfighter

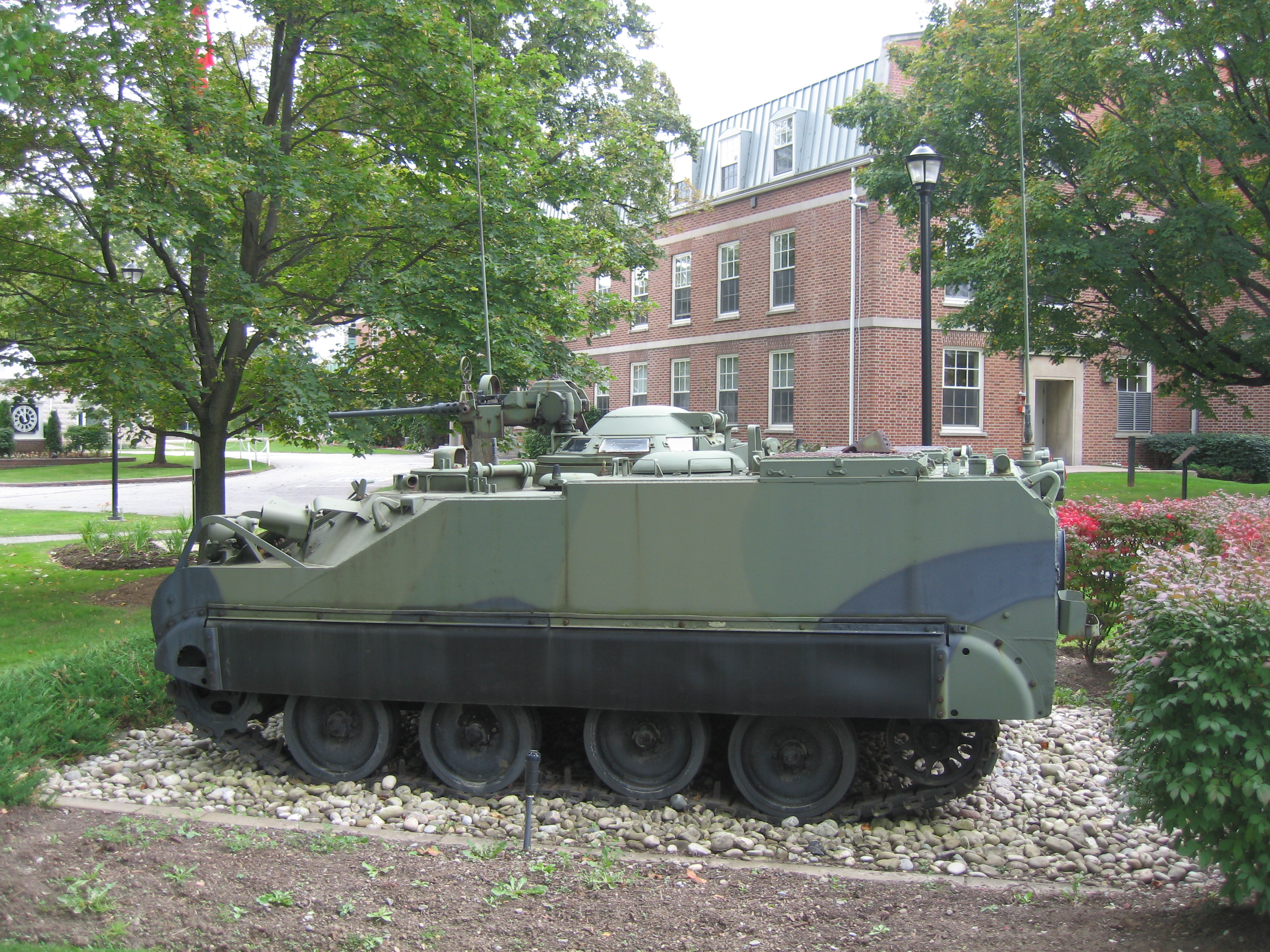
The Canadian Forces College's Lynx Reconnaissance Vehicle

== Curriculum ==
The programmes at the College are designed to “provide high-quality professional military education for selected Canadian and international officers[.]” The curriculum includes military doctrine, exercise and simulation, and the command, control, and administration of allocated personnel and financial resources. Instruction is bilingual and students are permitted to present written deliverables in the language of their choice. The institution maintains a partnership with the Royal Military College of Canada as well as liaisons with many other national and foreign educational institutions.

== Programmes ==
- Joint Command and Staff Programme (JCSP)
- National Security Programme (NSP)
- Joint Command and Staff Programme Distance Learning (JCSP DL)
- Joint Staff Operations Programme (JSOP)
- Canadian Security Studies Programme (CSSP)
- Executive Leaders' Programme (ELP)

== See also ==
- Royal Military College Saint-Jean
- Royal Roads Military College
- Royal Military College of Canada
- Canadian government scientific research organizations
- Canadian university scientific research organizations
- Canadian industrial research and development organizations
- The Canadian Crown and the Canadian Forces
- Defence Research and Development Canada
- Khaki University
