= De La Salle High School =

De La Salle High School may refer to:

- De La Salle College (Toronto) in Toronto, Ontario, Canada
- De La Salle High School (Concord, California)
- De La Salle Institute, Chicago, Illinois
- De La Salle High School (New Orleans, Louisiana)
- De La Salle Collegiate High School in Warren, Michigan
- DeLaSalle High School in Minneapolis, Minnesota
- De La Salle North Catholic High School in Portland, Oregon
- Colegio De La Salle in Bayamon, Puerto Rico

== See also ==
- De La Salle (disambiguation)
- De La Salle Academy (disambiguation)
- De La Salle School (disambiguation)
- La Salle (disambiguation)
- La Salle High School (disambiguation)
- La Salle University (disambiguation)
- Lasallian educational institutions
