= Toronto Hunt Club =

Coordinates: 43.680918°N 79.272022°W

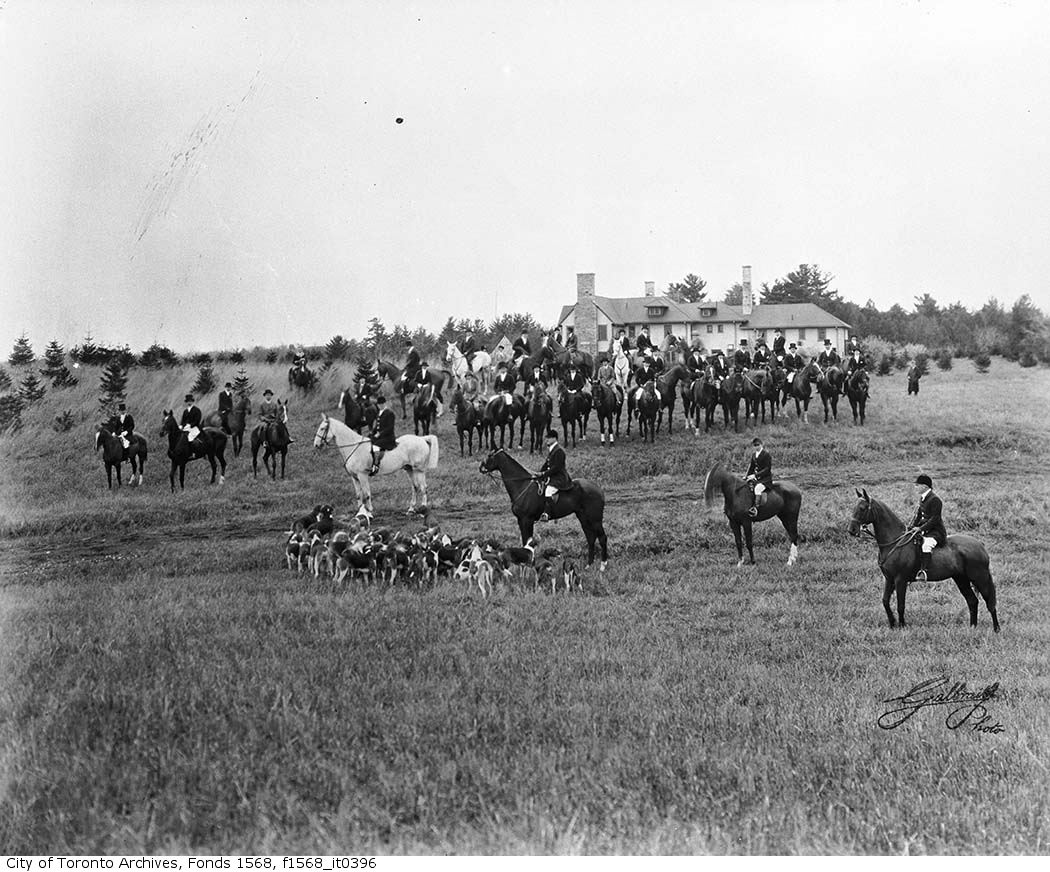
A meeting of the Toronto Hunt Club during the 1920s in King, Ontario

The Toronto Hunt Club was established in 1843 as a fox hunting club by British Army officers of the Toronto garrison (Fort York). It held gymkhana equestrian events at various sites around Toronto. In 1895, it acquired its first permanent home in a rural area east of the city in Scarborough, between Kingston Road and Lake Ontario.

In 1898, the Scarborough radial line was extended eastward to the site, and soon the area became a cottage district and then a streetcar suburb of Toronto. This forced the equestrian activities to move further afield. As a result, the horses were moved in 1907 to a property in Thornhill (Steeles' Corner at Steeles Avenue and Yonge Street) called "Green Bush Lodge".

During the 1920s, the Toronto Hunt Club split its pack of hounds into two groups. One group was moved to a farm in the Aurora area, and the other was moved to a property in Toronto near Eglinton Avenue.

== Eglinton site ==
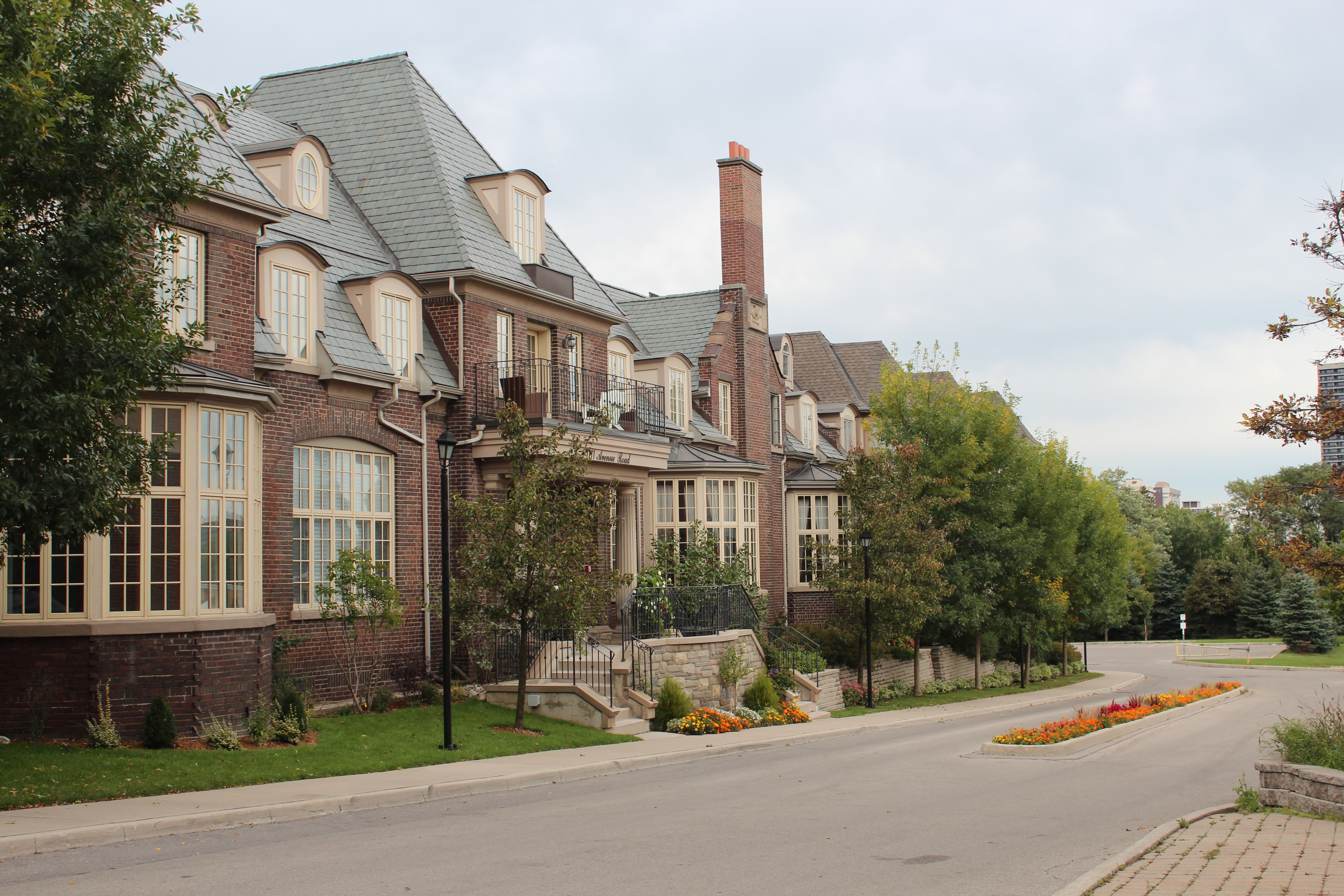
The 1929 clubhouse on Avenue Rd

In 1919, a member of the Toronto Hunt Club had established a large facility for equine sports on a then-rural site in Toronto to the northeast of Avenue Road and Eglinton Avenue. A polo arena, clubhouse and other facilities were constructed, and it became known as the Eglinton Hunt Club. In 1934, the Eglinton Hunt Club was officially recognized as a separate entity. However, the 1930s saw the club run into financial difficulties.

In 1939, with the outbreak of the Second World War, the large site was purchased by the Government of Canada and turned into a secret Royal Canadian Air Force (RCAF) research facility, the No. 1 Clinical Investigation Unit (CIU). Noted scientists Frederick Banting and Wilbur R. Franks were employed there, and it was at the CIU that Franks invented the anti gravity g-suit. The property was also home to RCAF No. 1 Initial Training School, a unit of the British Commonwealth Air Training Plan. After the war, the site became the RCAF Staff School, and it remained an officer training facility of the Canadian Forces until it closed in 1994.

By 1995, the federal government transferred the property to the Metropolitan Separate School Board (which was subsequently renamed as the Toronto Catholic District School Board) to replace De La Salle College Secondary School, which had been privatized in 1994. Marshall McLuhan Catholic Secondary School was built on the site in 1998.

== Scarborough site ==
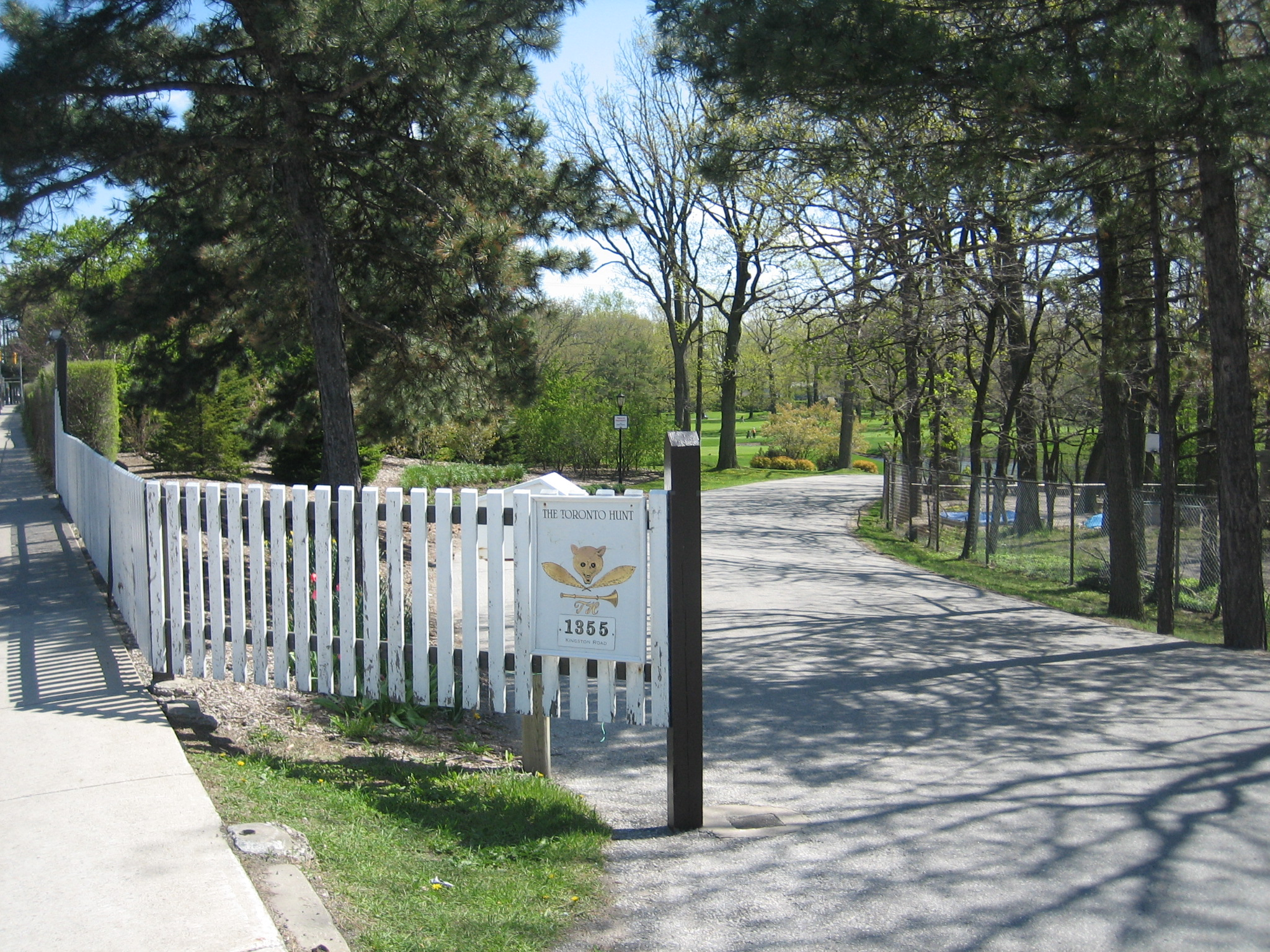
Entrance to the Toronto Hunt Club's original site in Scarborough, which is now a private golf club

The Toronto Hunt Club had acquired its original site in Scarborough in 1895, but during the ensuing decades, it was used increasingly as a golf course instead of for fox hunting. During the early 1930s, the hunting and golfing sections of the club were formally divided, with the hunting section becoming a separate entity known as the Toronto & North York Hunt, which still exists as a hunt club.

The Scarborough property remains an exclusive private golf club today, and its street address is 1355 Kingston Road. The golf club is called The Toronto Hunt, and it claims 1843 as its founding date.
