= LaSalle station =

LaSalle station or De La Salle station may refer to:

== Canada ==
- LaSalle station (Exo), a commuter rail station in Montreal, Quebec
- LaSalle station (Montreal Metro), a rapid transit station in Montreal, Quebec

== Mexico ==
- De La Salle (Mexico City Metrobús), a bus rapid transit station in Mexico City

== United States ==
- Kirkwood/La Salle station, a light rail station in San Francisco, California
- LaSalle station (CTA), a rapid transit station in Chicago, Illinois
- LaSalle Street Station, a commuter rail station in Chicago, Illinois
- LaSalle/Van Buren station, a rapid transit station in Chicago, Illinois
- Peru–LaSalle station, a former railway station in LaSalle, Illinois
- LaSalle station (Buffalo Metro Rail), a light rail station in Buffalo, New York

== See also ==
- La Salle (disambiguation) § Transportation
