= La Salle Township =

La Salle Township may refer to the following places in the United States:

- LaSalle Township, LaSalle County, Illinois
- La Salle Township, Michigan
