= Lou Agase =

American football player and coach (1924–2006)

Profile
- Positions: Left tackle, Tight end

Personal information
- Born: August 2, 1924; Evanston, Illinois, U.S.
- Died: June 26, 2006 (aged 81)

Career information
- College: Illinois
- NFL draft: 1948: 15th round, 131st overall pick

Career history
- 1948–1949: Paxton High School (HC)
- 1950–1954: Illinois (OLC)
- 1955–1959: Michigan State (DLC)
- 1960–1962: Toronto Argonauts (HC)

Awards and highlights
- First-team All-Big Nine (1947); 3× Rose Bowl champion (1947, 1952, 1956)

Lou Agase (August 2, 1924 – June 26, 2006) was an American gridiron football player and coach of Assyrian ancestry.

== Playing career ==
Agase played tight end and offensive tackle for the Illinois Fighting Illini football team from 1944 to 1947. He was a member of the Illini team that won the 1947 Rose Bowl. He was selected in the 15th round by the Green Bay Packers with the 131st pick of the 1948 NFL draft, but never played a game for the team.

== Coaching career ==
During the 1948–49 and 1949–50 school years, Agase was a teacher at Paxton High School in Paxton, Illinois. He coached football and track for the Mustangs and also started the school's first wrestling team. His two-year coaching record in football was 9–7.

On July 30, 1950, Agase returned to Illinois as an assistant coach. In 1955, he moved to Michigan State, where he was the Spartan's defensive line coach under Duffy Daugherty. During Mr. Agase's tenure as an assistant, MSU's football team won the Rose Bowl in 1956.

=== Toronto Argonauts ===
On December 4, 1959, Agase was named head coach of the Toronto Argonauts, replacing interim head coach Steve Owen, who was retained briefly as Agase's assistant. Toronto had finished each of the previous four seasons in last place in the four-team Interprovincial Rugby Football Union, and had not had a winning season since winning the Grey Cup in 1952. Agase introduced an adaptation of Michigan State's double-wing "T" offensive formation, in which the two halfbacks shifted into a wide position to become wide receivers. Acquiring NFL veteran quarterback Tobin Rote to run Agase's offence, the Argonauts won their first five games and finished in first place with a 10–4 record, Rote setting new IRFU records for completions in a game (38) and touchdown passes in a season (38), and passing for a record-tying seven touchdown passes in a single game on two occasions. However, the playoff final saw Toronto upset by second-place Ottawa, who had beaten them in three of five encounters in the regular season and won both legs of the two-game series. The novelty of Agase's offensive system having worn off, his injury-plagued team struggled to find consistency in the 1961 season, but finished strongly with wins in four of the last six games to secure third-place with a 7-6-1 record, the first time in nine seasons that Toronto had strung together back-to-back winning seasons. Fan and press frustration in the first half of the season were directed at Agase and Rote in particular, but the mood changed after a 43–19 upset victory in Ottawa to win the Eastern semi-final, and a 25–7 win in a sold-out Exhibition Stadium over Hamilton in the first leg of the Eastern final. But a disastrous 20–2 loss in the second leg in Hamilton, setting up an overtime period in which the Tiger-Cats scored four unanswered touchdowns, sealed Agase's fate in Toronto. The blame for this historic collapse, which recalled the 20-point blown lead in the 1960 final, was placed at the coach's door owing to some questionable play calling when Toronto had a chance to kick for a single point in the last minute of regulation time, and Agase was dismissed on August 25, 1962, after an 0–3 start to the 1962 season. His replacement, assistant coach Nobby Wirkowski, guided Toronto to a last-place, 4-10 finish, and the team would not have another winning season until 1968. Agase's overall coaching record with the Argonauts, 17–13–1, ranks among the best in team history.

== Personal life ==
Agase's older brother Alex was also a football player and coach.
