= LaSalle Hotel =

La Salle Hotel or LaSalle Hotel may refer to:

- LaSalle Hotel (Bryan, Texas), Bryan, Texas, US
- LaSalle Hotel (South Bend, Indiana), South Bend, Indiana, US
- La Salle Hotel, Chicago, Illinois, US
- The LaSalle Chicago, a hotel opened in 2022 in the Continental and Commercial National Bank
