= De La Salle College, Colombo =

De La Salle College
- 6.9623°N 79.8626°E; Mutwal, Colombo 01500; Sri Lanka

Information
- Type: National School
- Motto: Latin: Indivisa Manent (Remain Undivided)
- Denomination: Roman Catholic
- Established: 1905
- Founder: Rev. Br. Junianus Edward FSC
- Director: Rev. Br. Joseph Jeyakanthan FSC
- Grades: 1 - 13
- Gender: Boys
- Enrolment: 1250
- Colours: Red and blue
- Affiliation: De La Salle Brothers of the Christian Schools
- Alumni: Old LaSallians
- Website: delasalle.lk

De La Salle College, Colombo is the only school in Sri Lanka dedicated to the Patron Saint of Christian Teachers St. John Baptist de la Salle, founder of the congregation of De La Salle Brothers of the Christian Schools in Latin: "Fratres Scholarum Christianarum"(FSC).

== Directors / Principals ==
The college was inaugurated on 1 February 1905 by the LaSallian Brothers. Since then the school has been headed by many LaSallian Brothers as listed below.

Directors / Principals :
| Junianus Edward | 1905/02/01 | Founder |
| Bartholomew Paul | 1905/02/01 | First Director |
| Edwin George | 1905/02/01 | First Sub Director |
| Augustine Joseph | 1919 - 1923 | |
| Alexander Basil | 1923 - 1925 | |
| Luke Gregory | 1925 - 1931 | Silver Jubilee |
| Claude Marie | 1932 - 1933 | |
| Glastian Olivere | 1933 - 1935 | |
| Wenceslaus | 1935 - 1937 | |
| Caeser Albert | 1937 - 1938 | |
| Emile OD Jeziza | 1938 - 1940 | |
| Austin Anthony | 1940 - 1943 | |
| Anselm Calixtus | 1943 - 1945 | |
| Vincent Aloysius | 1945 - 1946 | |
| Caeser Albert | 1946 - 1949 | Second Time |
| Glastian Olivere | 1950 - 1951 | Second Time |
| Austin Anthony | 1951 - 1952 | Second Time |
| Stanislaus Norbert | 1952 - 1953 | Acting Director |
| Hermenegild Joseph | 1953 - 1958 | Golden Jubilee |
| Stephen Harding | 1958 - 1959 | |
| Vincent Joseph | 1960 - 1961 | |
| T Alphonsus | 1961 - 1966 | |
| Edwin Ambrose | 1966 - 1969 | |
| Thomas Philip | 1966 - 1967 | Acting Director |
| Joseph Nicholas | 1969 - 1972 | |
| A. Brenden | 1972 - 1976 | |
| Eustace Bastian | 1976 - 1978 | |
| Aloysius Stephen | 1978 - 1986 | Diamond Jubilee |
| Placidus Fernando | 1986 - 1989 | |
| Ignatius Warnakula | 1989 - 1992 | |
| Eustace Bastian | 1992 - 1994 | Second Time |
| Anil Fernando | 1994 - 1995 | Acting Director |
| Ernest Tarcisius | 1995 - 2012 | Centennial Jubilee |
| Newman Muthuthambi | 2013 – 2020 | OMI Priest |
| Joseph Jeyakanthan | 2021 – up to now | |

== House system ==
Rev Br Luke Gregory, introduced a house system, with four houses: Edward, Augustine, Luke and Hermenegild, each named after a De La Salle brother. This system is used for events such as inter-house sports and athletics.

=== Edward House ===
- Named after the Founder of the school Junianus Edward, guardian and the presiding genius of the De La Salle School from 1 February 1905 to 15 July 1925. German Junianus Edward was appointed Director of De La Salle Brothers' Mother House in Mutwal, Colombo on 8 July 1904 and was appointed the first Provincial Visitor of the De La Salle Brothers newly erected District of Colombo on 1 September 1919.
- House Colour : Green

=== Augustine House ===
- The first college hall was built by Augustine Joseph FSC during his tenure as director of the college between 1919 and 1923.
- House Colour : Blue

=== Luke House ===
- Named after Luke Gregory.
- House Colour : Red

=== Hermenegild House ===
- Named after Hermenegild Joseph.
- House Colour : Yellow

== Battle of the DEs ==
The Mazenodian-LaSallian (The Battle of the DEs) was an annual cricket encounter between De Mazenod College, Kandana and De La Salle College, Mutwal in since 1955. It is known as The Battle of the DEs due to the names of the two schools.
