= La Salle (surname) =

La Salle, Lassalle, or de La Salle is a surname. Notable people with the surname include:

- Adrien-Nicolas Piédefer, marquis de La Salle (1735–1818), a French writer and cavalry officer
- Antoine de la Salle (1385/86–1460/61), French courtier, educator and writer
- Antoine Charles Louis de Lasalle (1775–1809), French cavalry general during the French Revolution and Napoleonic Wars
- Bernard de la Salle (fl. 1360s), a French mercenary captain during the Hundred Years War
- Denise LaSalle (1939-2018), American singer
- Eriq La Salle (born 1962), American actor
- Ferdinand Lassalle (1825–1864), German-Jewish jurist and socialist political activist
- François Poulletier de la Salle (1719–1788), a French medical doctor and chemist
- Gadifer de la Salle (1340–1415), French soldier of Poitevine origin
- Horace His de la Salle (1795-1878), a French art collector
- Jean-Baptiste de La Salle (1651–1719), Patron saint of Teachers and Founder of Institute of the Brothers of the Christian Schools
- Joseph P. LaSalle (1916–1983), American mathematician known for the LaSalle invariance principle
- Lise de la Salle (born 8 May 1988), a French classical pianist
- Mick LaSalle (born 1959), movie critic for the San Francisco Chronicle
- Nicolas de la Salle (died 1710), French colonial governor
- René-Robert Cavelier, Sieur de La Salle (1643–1687), French explorer of North America
