= De La Salle School =

De La Salle School may refer to:

- De La Salle School, Basildon, in Essex, England
- De La Salle School, St Helens, in Merseyside, England
- De La Salle School, a former name of Dixons Croxteth Academy, in Liverpool, Merseyside, England
- De La Salle School, Singapore (see List of primary schools in Singapore)

== See also ==
- La Sallian educational institutions
- De La Salle High School (disambiguation)
