= De La Salle College (Toronto) =

Coordinates: 43.682476°N 79.398848°W

De La Salle College "Oaklands"
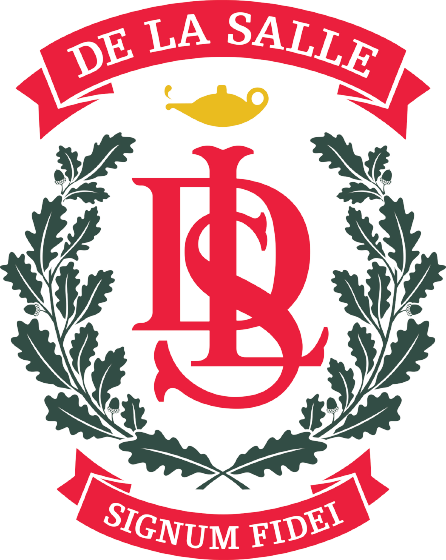

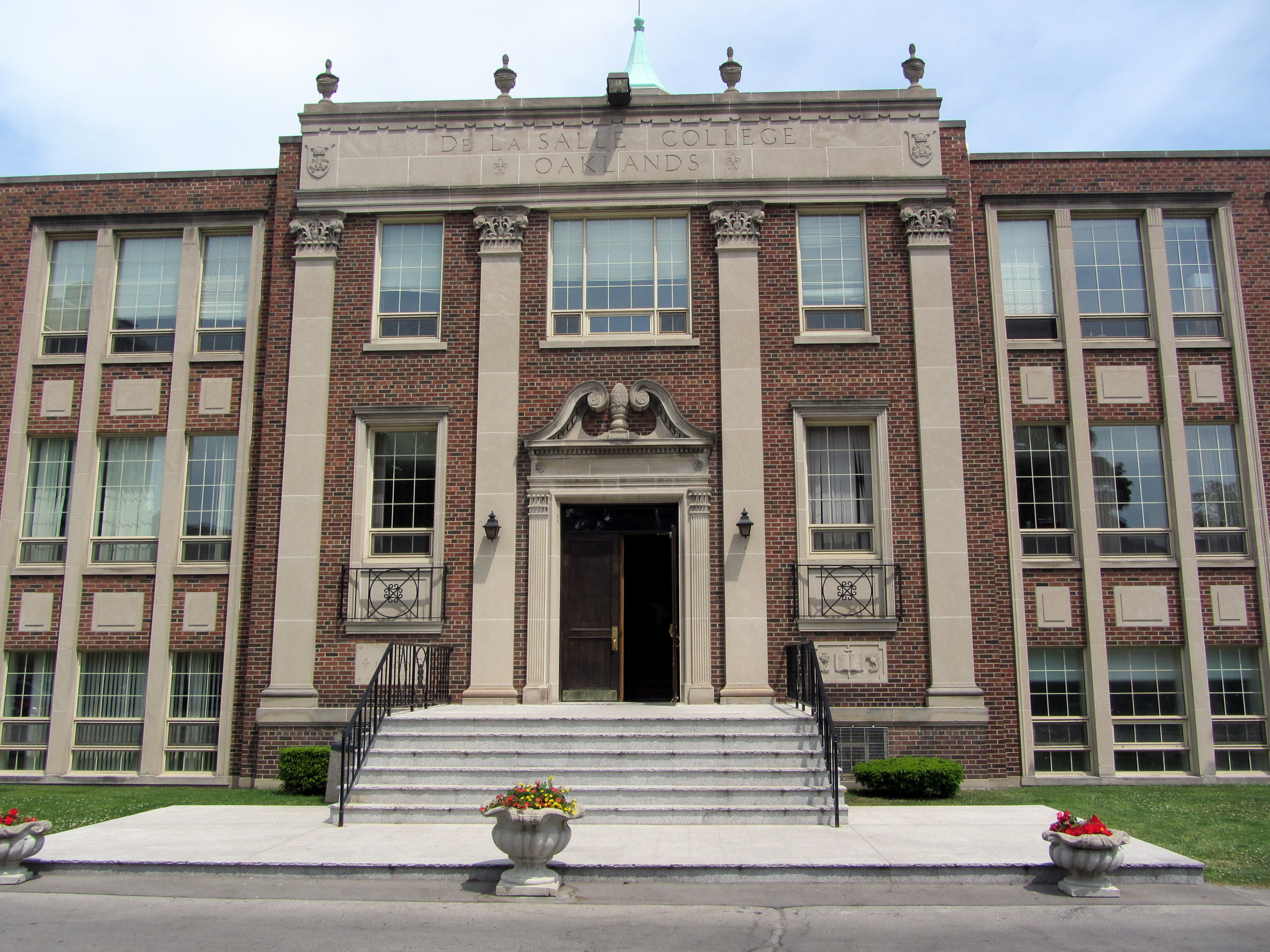
- 131 Farnham Avenue; Toronto, Ontario, M4V 1H7; Canada

Information
- Type: Independent day school
- Motto: Signum Fidei (Latin for 'Sign of Faith')
- Religious affiliations: Roman Catholic (Christian Brothers)
- Patron saint: Jean-Baptiste de La Salle
- Established: 1851; 175 years ago 1994 (current form)
- Founder: Institute of the Brothers of the Christian Schools
- School board: 1987–1994: Toronto Catholic District School Board (formerly Metropolitan Separate School Board); 1851–1967, 1994–present: Independent
- President: Robert Lundy
- Principal: Brother Philip Ejiro Tialobi, FSC
- Grades: 5–12
- Gender: Co-educational
- Enrolment: 680
- Language: English
- Colors: Green and Red
- Slogan: Enter to Learn, Leave to Serve
- Mascot: Sal the Squirrel
- Website: www.delasalle.ca

De La Salle College "Oaklands" (also known as De La Salle College, Toronto, or simply Del by the school community) is an independent, co-educational, Catholic college preparatory institution run by the Institute of the Brothers of the Christian Schools in Toronto, Ontario. Founded by the Christian Brothers in 1851, it offers a rigorous liberal arts education from grades 5 through 12, consistent with its Lasallian traditions and values.

De La Salle "Oaklands" has an extensive history as a college-preparatory institution in the Roman Catholic tradition as founded in 1679 in Reims, France, by Jean-Baptiste de La Salle (also the patron saint of the college). From 1967 to 1994, the school was operated as part of the Metropolitan Separate School Board, renamed to the Toronto Catholic District School Board in 1998, as part of its family of a public separate secondary schools, at first for ninth and tenth grades from 1967, then fully in 1987. Following its privatization in 1994, the school in the area was directly replaced by Marshall McLuhan Catholic Secondary School, which opened in 1998.

== History ==
=== Early history ===
De La Salle College "Oaklands" was founded by, and continues to be administered by, the Institute of the Brothers of the Christian Schools. It is part of a global community of Lasallian educational institutions that are assisted by more than 73,000 lay colleagues and teach over 900,000 students in over 80 countries, varying from teaching in impoverished nations like Nigeria to post-secondary institutions like La Salle University (Philadelphia), Bethlehem University and De La Salle University-Manila.

The central administration of the Brothers operates out of the Generalate in Rome and is made up of the Superior General and his councillors. From 1851 to the present day, the Brothers based in English Canada have provided assistance in creating 58 schools, ("Lasallian Educational Apostolates") primarily in Ontario, along with a few schools in Edmonton, Montreal, Saskatchewan and Cleveland, Ohio.

The Brothers of the Christian Schools arrived in Montreal in 1837 and founded the first permanent community of LaSallian Brothers in North America. At the request of Bishop Charbonnel, five Brothers came to Toronto in 1851 and established a grammar school at the corner of Lombard and Jarvis Streets. In September of that year, the Brothers extended their ministry to St. Paul's School, which is still in existence today. Among their early graduates was Denis T. O'Connor, who became the first Canadian-born Archbishop of Toronto in 1899.

The Brothers opened their own secondary school in 1863 on Jarvis Street, originally called the Christian Brothers Commercial Academy. In 1871, the school constructed a new building on Duke Street (258 Adelaide St. East today), and the name was changed to De La Salle Institute. The institute purchased the former post office next door (First Toronto Post Office) in 1874.

Twenty years later, the school was extended to include secondary education and took over the former Bank of Upper Canada building next door. The name De La Salle Institute was changed to De La Salle College in 1880, when university entrance courses were added to the commercial curriculum. The three-building site still stands at the corner of Adelaide and George Streets as 252–264 Adelaide Street East.

The next major step occurred in 1913, when De La Salle College took over part of the 67 Bond Street building adjacent to St. Michael's Cathedral. In 1916, the College vacated the buildings on Adelaide Street. In 1925, the senior section was relocated to De La Salle Moore Park, in what is now Our Lady of Perpetual Help School. In 1932 and 1933, these classes were moved to nearby De La Salle College "Oaklands", which had opened in 1931.

=== Later history: "Oaklands" ===
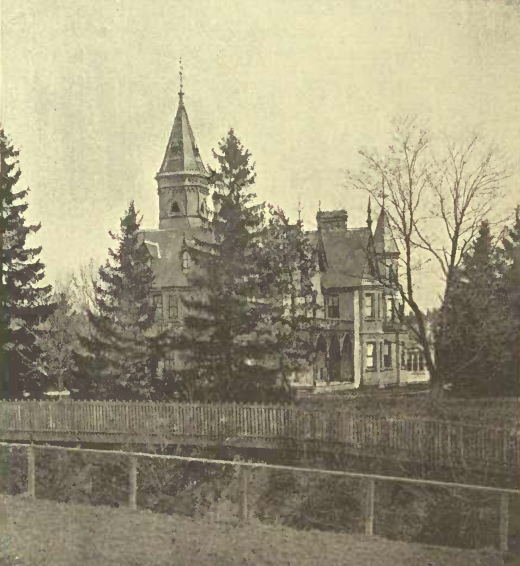
The Oaklands estate, seen here in 1891

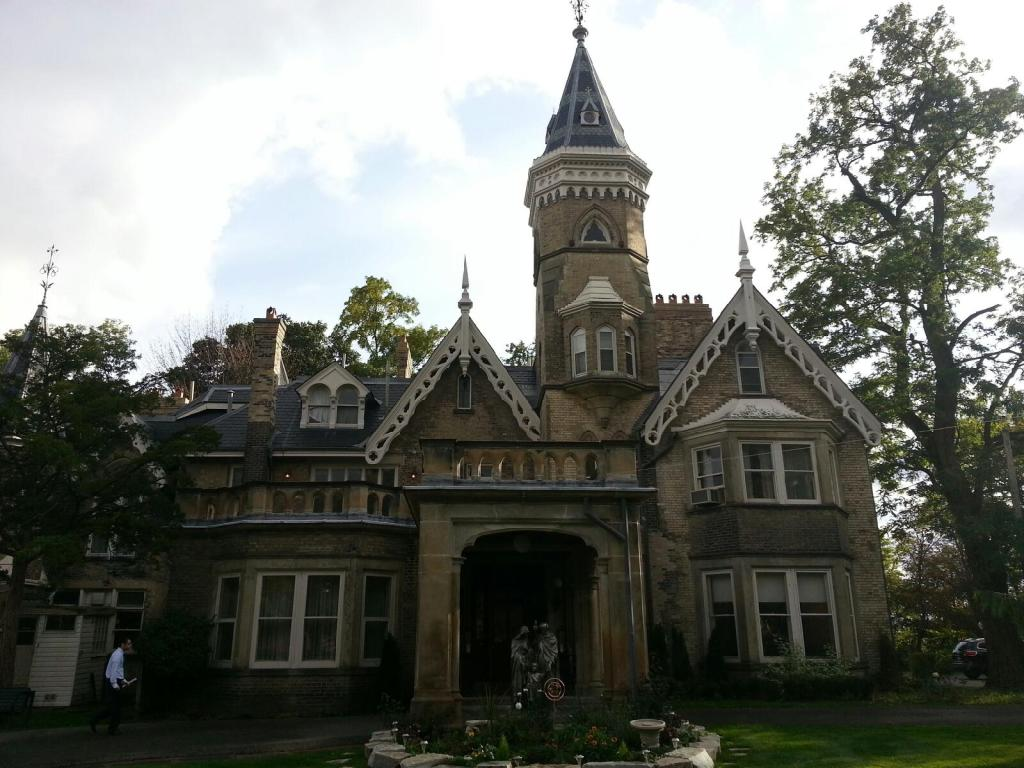
The Oaklands mansion in 2013

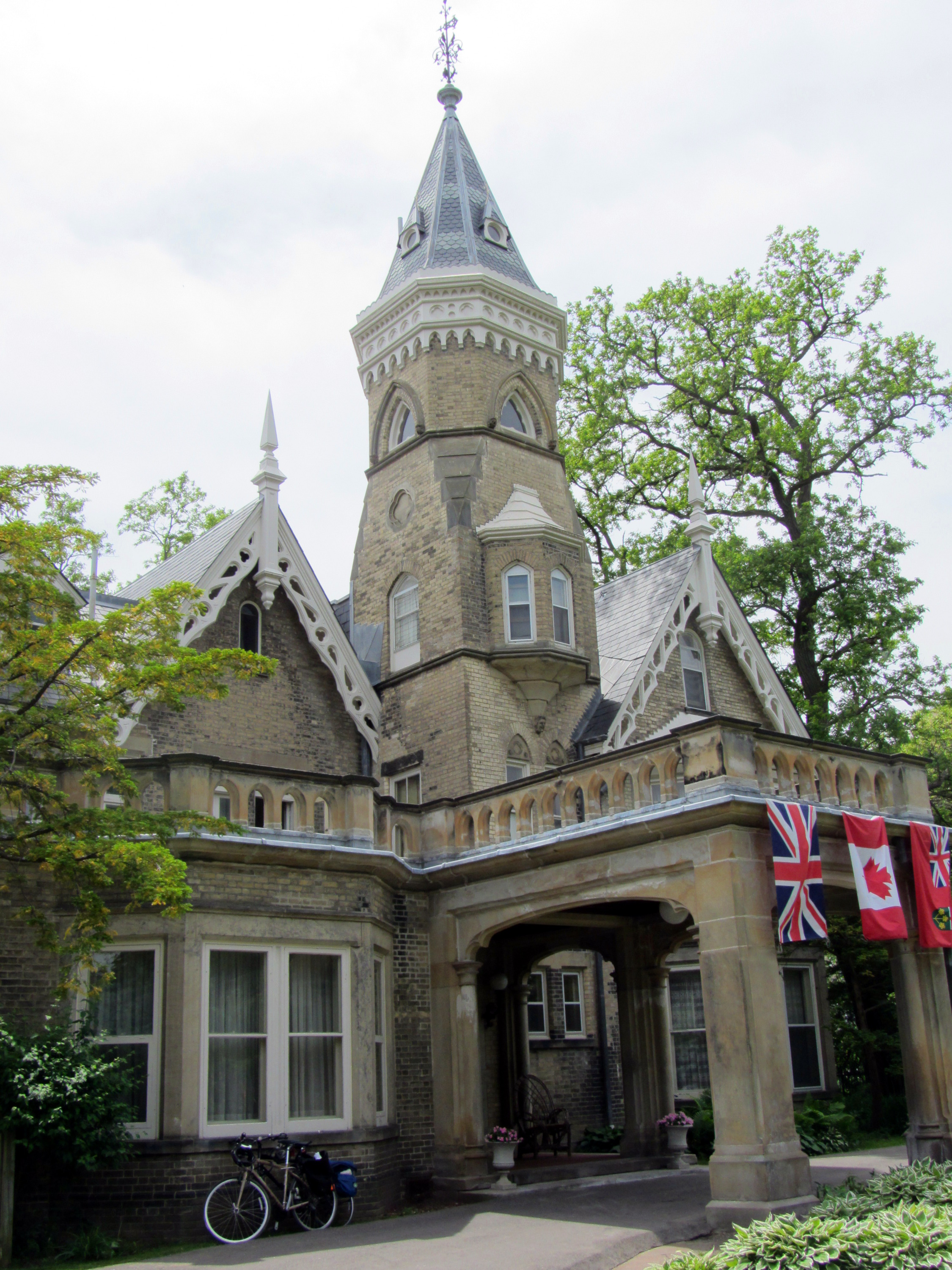
Front of the Oaklands mansion

Located in Deer Park, an estate named "Oaklands" was once part of the Crown land that was deeded in 1798 to the Honourable John Elmsley. In 1858, John Macdonald — a dry goods merchant who would become the only Liberal appointee to the Senate by Canada's founding Prime Minister, Sir John A. Macdonald — acquired 35 acres (140,000 m^{2}) of it from the Anglican Church and built what is at present the residence of the Brothers. This land ran up the east side of College Avenue (now Avenue Road) from what is today Cottingham Street to St. Clair Avenue. He named the property "Oaklands" due to the splendid abundance of oak trees in the area.

Construction of Macdonald's mansion on the property at the crest of the hill, begun in 1860, was completed with a tower observatory that would provide him with a clear view of Lake Ontario some 5 kilometres to the south. Currently, the Oaklands mansion has been designated as a historical building by the City of Toronto, as an example of local Gothic Revival architecture. The property was purchased in 1905 by the family of Cyrus McCormick, whose farm implement business evolved to become International Harvester. The home was used by Mary Virginia McCormick, who was the eldest daughter of Cyrus McCormick.

The Brothers of the Christian Schools bought 12 acres (4.9 ha) of the property in 1931 and turned it into a boys' school. Three benefactors (T. P. Phelan, Abe Orpen and Frank O'Connor) paid the interest on the property's CA$300,000 mortgage for three years to help establish the school. Brother Alfred was the guiding genius in acquiring the property and became the school's first Director/Principal. In its first year, the school was home to 270 students and had matriculation classes ranging from Grade 5 through to Grade 10. Ten years later, grades 1 through 4 were added. In 1970, the first 5 grades were phased out, leaving only Grades 6, 7 and 8 in addition to the full high school curriculum.

The school's primary focus is its emphasis on academia above all other matters. Traditionally, all graduates advance to universities in Canada and the United States; it is a very rare occurrence for a student to matriculate and not proceed to university.

Oaklands had also fostered a reputation for its musicals and drama efforts which, for the most part, commenced in 1951 and carry on to the present day. As well, its student-run newspaper, Oakleaves, which has provided commentary about the school's goings-on since 1931.

In 1950, after a great deal of effort and sacrifice on the part of the Brothers and the alumni of the school, the present main building structure was officially opened. De La Salle "Oaklands" had always been a completely private school, but in 1967, a very significant change took place when grades nine and ten were placed under the auspices of the Metropolitan Separate School Board (now known as the Toronto Catholic District School Board), while grades 6, 7, 8, 11, 12 and 13 remained under the Brothers' jurisdiction as an independent private school.

Prior to the 1970s, De La Salle "Oaklands" demonstrated an ordered and disciplined environment where direction and goals were clear and commitment by students, teachers and parents to that culture was strong. In the 1970s and 1980s, society underwent change and the school mirrored the milieu in which it existed. Spontaneity, flexibility and creativity replaced the status quo. The traditional students' blazer was abandoned, returning in 1974.

By 1987, the maintenance, curriculum, funding and control of the entire high school was under the MSSB. However, full funding of Roman Catholic public separate high schools in Toronto in 1987 was intended to preserve the individual identity brought to each school by its founding religious order. In a joint letter, the Catholic Private Secondary School Principals of Toronto urged the continuation of each school's heritage.

Individual religious communities have put their stamp on the schools that they have run. Such individual charisms are a unique and priceless legacy to our Catholic schools ... that should be preserved.

In 1989, a flood caused by student vandalism caused over $4,000,000 of damage to the main building. More than 850 students were moved temporarily to the former site of Kingsmill Secondary School, which closed a year prior and later became Bishop Allen Academy. The school was eventually completely repaired and renovated.

In September 1993, the Ontario provincial government proposed a "de-streaming" of classes, meaning that students would no longer be divided into advanced, general and basic levels (note: despite the participation of the MSSB at Oaklands since 1967, the school had only offered 'advanced' level classes). In response, the school requested of the MSSB that De La Salle carry on as an 'advanced-classes-only' academy. This request was rejected by the school board.

=== Since 1994 ===
In 1993, the school began considering whether it should leave the MSSB. That same year in a letter on June 28, the school notified the MSSB that as of June 30, 1994, Oaklands would re-privatize. After much ongoing thought and discussion, the Brothers of the Christian Schools determined that returning the school to its former independent status would best meet the spiritual and educational needs of the Catholic community they are called to serve. In September 1994, De La Salle College Oaklands again reopened its doors as a private, independent, now co-educational, university preparatory school. The school had planned to do a "phase-out" to allow existing students to continue going to a public separate school, but by 1994, Brother Francis McCrea delivered a letter to the MSSB on February 21, 1994 that stated the school would not participate in a phase-out. De La Salle had decided not to do a phase-out, and each student was willing to pay $6,300 per year in tuition, prompting protests from some parents. By December 1993, there was a proposed plan to allow the MSSB to pay for the continuing education of existing De La Salle pupils.

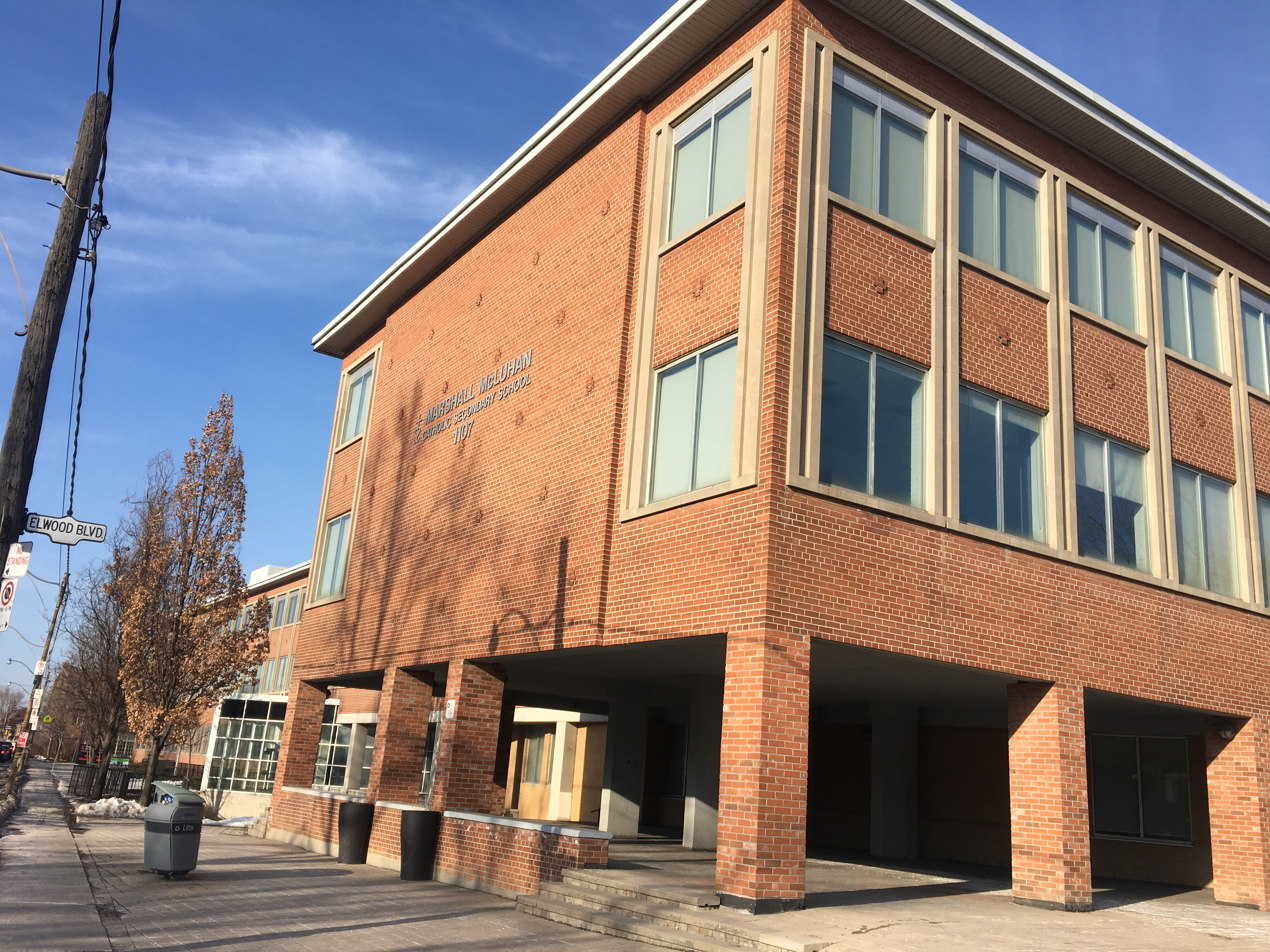
Marshall McLuhan Catholic Secondary School was established in 1998, as a replacement and a result of De La Salle's re-privatization.

In order to serve the needs of its existing students at the time of re-privatization, the Brothers of the Christian Schools funded financial assistance, from full scholarships to partial scholarships, to any existing advanced-level student who wished to stay enrolled at the school. In all, 58 students accepted the Brothers' offer. Today, the school provides numerous bursaries and scholarships, such as the Superior General's Scholarship which finances a students full tuition, to ensure that lesser-advantaged students have reasonable access to the school as was the Brothers' practice in the pre-MSSB era. As well, Oaklands strives to maintain its tuition levels to be among the lowest for independent secondary schools in the Greater Toronto Area — approximately $15,000 per academic year, in keeping with their Founder's ideals of accessibility to all students.

De La Salle's replacement and successor school in the area on Avenue Road north of Eglinton, Marshall McLuhan Catholic Secondary School, was opened in 1998 in the former Toronto Hunt Club. This co-educational high school has since served grades 9 to 12.

== Overview ==
=== Campus ===
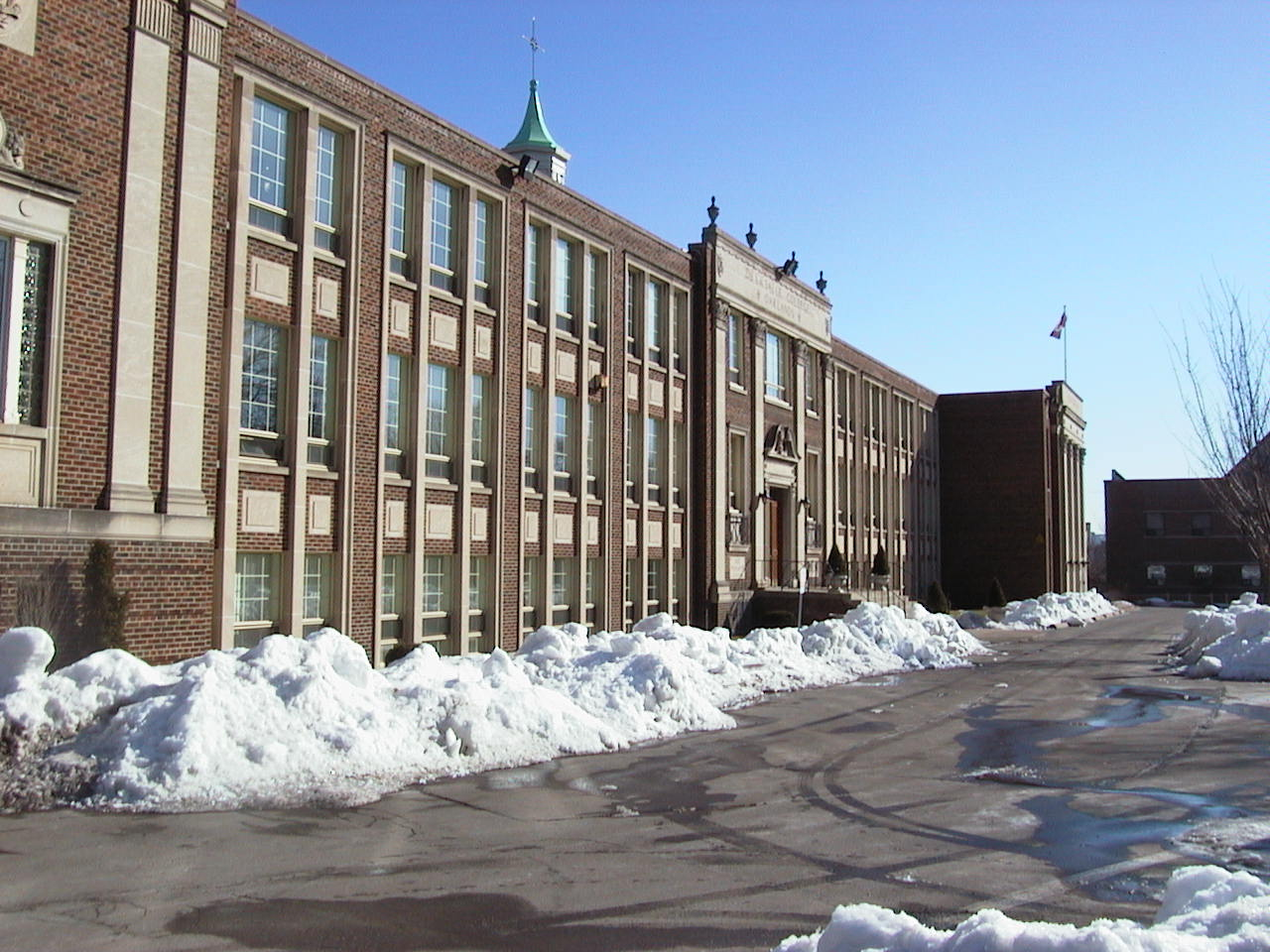
The school's main building

The Oaklands campus, in the heart of Toronto, obtained its name because of the great oak trees that adorned the property. To this day, the majestic oaks still stand, providing the ideal setting for study. There are eight major areas to the campus:

- Main Building
  - Which includes classrooms, administration, auditorium, gymnasium, cafeteria, and chapel.
- Innovation Centre
  - Which includes science labs, computer labs, study area, robotics workshop and offices.
- Oaklands Stadium
  - Which includes multipurpose field, running track; volleyball, pickleball and basketball courts.
- The "Bubble"
  - Indoor sport court
- John Hunt Student Life Centre
  - Which includes gymnasium, fitness room, library, multisport stimulator, classrooms and cafeteria.
  - previously the Arena.
- Music Hall
  - Which includes an Art Classroom.
  - Previously the De La Salle Student Centre.
- Brother Domenic Viggiani FSC Heritage House
  - Which includes offices and residence.
- Gate House

In 2005, the school completed construction of its outdoor, all-purpose gym/tennis courts/batting cages. As of September 2015, the school completed installation of its new artificial turf playing field.

In the summer of 2023, The school's President announced plans to reconstruct the Arena into the new Student Life Centre, this is planned to include; a student commons area, offices and gyms. In 2024 the started construction with the president breaking ground.

=== Athletics ===
The college formerly operated a junior ice hockey team from the 1910s to 1940s in the Ontario Hockey Association. The College won the J. Ross Robertson Cup as the playoffs champions in 1918. Alumni from the junior hockey team who later played in the National Hockey League include, Babe Dye, Red Green, Jack Ingoldsby, Duke McCurry, Eddie Rodden, Sid Smith and Jesse Spring.

De La Salle "Oaklands" have won multiple city and provincial championships (particularly in hockey and football) in the 1950s, 1960s, 1970s and 1980s. After the school had re-privatized in 1994, its initial efforts on the competitive playing fields were pale in comparison to its rich history. However, by the year 2000, teams from De La Salle were beginning to be noticed. Teams such as the Girls and Boys Varsity Hockey, Boys Varsity Basketball, Girls Volleyball, and Girls Soccer were regularly advancing far into the playoffs of their respective leagues, with some making their way to the OFSAA championships. In the fall of 2002, its Senior Boys football team made its improbable run to upset heavily favoured Upper Canada College and St. Andrews College for the CISAA championship, and then beat Markham, Lakeshore Catholic, and Nelson for the Ontario Golden Horseshoe Bowl (regional championships).

From 1952 to 1957, the school's senior football team was coached by Toronto Argonauts legendary quarterback Nobby Wirkowski and won consecutive league championships in 1955, 1956 and 1957.

Athletic championships (since 1932)
team	years
College Group Midget Hockey Championship	1932
OHA Provincial Junior "B" Hockey Championship	1944, 1946, 1947
OHA Provincial Midget Hockey Championship	1948
THL Minor Bantam Hockey Championship	1950, 1952, 1955
THL Minor Juveniles Hockey Championship	1958
THL Midget Hockey Championship	1948, 1950, 1951, 1954, 1958
THL Juvenile "A" Hockey Championship	1954, 1955, 1956, 1960, 1962
OCAC Senior Hockey Championship	1958
TDCAA Senior Hockey Championship	1964, 1977
CISAA Varsity Boys Hockey Championship	2012
TDCAA Junior Hockey Championship	1965, 1966, 1973, 1976, 1978, 1979, 1990, 1991
TDCAA Bantam Hockey Championship	1964
CYO Bantam Hockey Championship	1979-80
CISAA Boys U-14 Hockey Championship	2001
Brother Arthur Memorial Hockey Championships	1988, 2000, 2005, 2006, 2007, 2008, 2011, 2017
UCC Invitational Boys U-14 Hockey Tournament Championship	2001
TDCAA Varsity Girls Hockey Championships	1999, 2000
CISAA Girls Varsity Hockey Championship	2000, 2005–2006
Varsity Girls Hockey Ice Gardens Tournament Championship	2005
OCAC Bantam Football Championship	1962
OCAC Junior Football Championship	1953, 1957, 1959
OCAC Senior Football Championship	1955, 1956, 1957, 1958, 1961
TDCAA Bantam Football Championship	1966, 1967
TDCAA Junior Football Championship	1964, 1965, 1973
TDCAA Senior Football Championship	1965, 1966, 1967, 1968, 1969, 1971
CISAA Boys Football Championship	2002
OFSAA Golden Horseshoe Bowl Senior Football Championship	2002
OCAC Bantam Basketball Championship	1954, 1958
OCAC Midget Basketball Championship	1957, 1960, 1961, 1962
OCAC Junior Basketball Championship	1957
OCAC Senior Basketball Championship	1957
TDCAA Senior Basketball Championship	1966, 1967, 1973, 1974
CISAA Junior Basketball Championship (D II)	2008
CISAA Girls U-14 Basketball Championship	2004, 2006
TDCAA Senior Baseball Championship	1983, 1984, 1985
TDCAA Bantam Volleyball Championship	1984
TDCAA Boys Bantam Soccer Championship	1990, 1991, 2008
CISAA Girls Cross-Country Championship	2000, 2004, 2005, 2006, 2008, 2009, 2010
CISAA Overall Cross-Country Championship	2005, 2006, 2008, 2009, 2010, 2011, 2013–2016
CISAA Girls Track and Field Championship	2005 2008, 2009, 2010
CISAA Division 2 Junior Boys Basketball Champions	2012
CISAA Division 2 U14 Boys Hockey Champions	2019

=== Brother Arthur Tournament ===
Every December, Oaklands hosts an invitational hockey tournament named after Brother Arthur Brockman (1915–1979). The tournament began a year after his death and is held annually to this day.

=== Debating Society ===
De La Salle's Debating Society actively participates in numerous public speaking and debating tournaments, Canada-wide and internationally. De La Salle is a member of both the Fulford League and the Pro-Con League in Toronto. Former student Connor Campbell (2013) won the Debate Champion title at the 2012 World Individual Debating and Public Speaking Championship (WIDPSC) in Brisbane, Australia and the World Champion title at the 2013 WIDPSC Championship in Durban, South Africa. Del student Megan Campbell (2019) won the 2018 World Individual Debating and Public Speaking Championship in Cape Town, South Africa—the first time ever in the 31-year history of the event that a brother and sister have each won the World Champion title. Megan accomplished this in Grade 11.

=== Oak Leaves ===
Oak Leaves began as the school's student paper in 1938 and is still published today. It has won recognition from the Columbia University Literary Society and the Canadian School Papers Association not only for its appearance, but also for its journalistic qualities of writing and layout.

In response to the pandemic in the fall of 2021, Oak Leaves published its first-ever online publication. Each stage of production shifted to a virtual setting, embracing the mix of mediums that technology brings to this classic form of school-wide communication. The Editors in Chief worked closely with the Oak Leaves team to uphold the highest journalistic standards of its writers and editors in this new format.

== Student life ==
=== De La Salle Cadet Corps ===
The Oaklands Cadets (De La Salle Cadet Corps, DLSCC) was formed January 7, 1911 as #269 Royal Canadian Army Cadet Corps — involving nearly all the students at De La Salle College. (Though according to Corps historian Mr. Murt Howell, there is evidence to support the fact that the Cadet Corps at De La Salle existed even at the De La Salle grammar school at the corner of Lombard and Jarvis Streets even as far back as the 1860s). The Cadet Corps participated in the Guard of Honour for the Royal Visit in the 1930s. During the Second World War one of the ex cadets, Major Fred Tilston, was awarded the Victoria Cross for his actions at Hochwald Forest. Following the Second World War, the Cadet Corps was disbanded December 1, 1947, and perpetuated in the De La Salle Drum and Bugle Corps — which grew to great renown in the 1950s, 1960s and 1970s.

The Oaklands Cadets reformed September, 2004 by petition of Oaklands Lasallian student Mena Ghabbour. The Cadet Corps is independent and is not associated to the Canadian Cadet Organizations sponsored by the Army Cadet, Air Cadet and Navy League in partnership with the Canadian Forces. The president, Brother Domenic Viggiani, FSC is the Corps' Honorary Colonel — keeping in tradition with that begun by the brother who began the program in 1911, Hon LCol, Brother Rogatian, FSC.

The De La Salle Cadet Corps (DLSCC) is a student-run, teacher-moderated program designed as a leadership laboratory for the participants in the program. Cadets are taught to systematically assess problems of a task, determine best courses of actions, strike out a plan, and then lead a team of their peers to successfully accomplish that plan. The military model is used to help further develop the values of honesty, loyalty, integrity, and intelligent obedience, as well as the academic prowess and physical fitness that it entails. The Corps was awarded "Team with the most Spirit" by the Patients and Staff at the Hospital for Sick Children for their participation in the Cadet Corps selected Charity: Meagan's Walk, in 2006.

=== Drum and Bugle Corps ===
In 1958, with the dissolution of the De La Salle Band, the De La Salle Oaklands Drum and Bugle Corps was born. Different from a traditional marching band, the Drum Corps (as they became known) played modern music with quick-paced formations that were clearly designed for crowd appeal. In their first 2 years, the Drum Corps placed 3rd in the Junior A National Championships. From 1961 to 1965, the Drum Corps would finish in 2nd at the Canadian National Championships and finally in 1969, would win the National Championships. They would go on to win consecutive national championships in 1970, 1971 and 1973.

=== De La Salle Camp ===
A boys' camp was opened by the Brothers in 1916 on the shores of Lake Simcoe at Jackson's Point, Ontario. Following a fire in November 1931, the camp re-opened the next summer with newly built facilities. It continued operating until 1980 when most of the property was sold to Georgina Township. It is now a town park.

=== Boarders ===
Boarders were commonplace at De La Salle dating back to 1871. At Oaklands, boarders first occupied 6 rooms at the Brothers' residence. The school opened its Junior Hall on what is now the arena grounds in 1936 and two years later, the house at 423 Avenue Road was leased, then purchased to house students.

The Gate House at the property's south-west corner (which stood guard over Senator MacDonald's original still-standing ornate entrance) was converted for student housing. Also, an exclusive home donated to the Brothers by the late Senator Frank O'Connor at his Wexford estate was converted to student housing. With the onset of the MSSBs participation at Oaklands in 1967 (which resulted in an influx of more locally based students), the need for boarders at the school had diminished and eventually, the programme was phased out.

=== Theatre De La Salle ===
Brother Gabriel Ray became well known for his dramatic productions, which were originally staged at Massey Hall. Except for four-year hiatus, Brother Gabriel was on the staff of De La Salle Bond Street from its opening in 1914 until 1932. He published three short volumes on Shakespearean characters and was well known for the following productions which were staged at Massey Hall:

1922 Shattered Dreams - written by Brother Gabriel 1923 Hamlet 1924 Merchant of Venice 1925 Macbeth (with 4,500 people in attendance) 1926 Passion Play

The "Oaklands" Auditorium

It was to Brother Gabriel's credit that the new school on the current campus opened in 1950 with its own auditorium. At his insistence, the new school building was to have an auditorium separate from a gymnasium and that it be a specific size. This is why the auditorium extends beyond the rest of the building. The home of what was later to be known was Theatre De La Salle had a sloping floor, an orchestra pit, a large marble foyer, and a balcony. The official opening of the auditorium was a formal occasion with dignitaries on hand as well as a ribbon-cutting ceremony to separate the curtains which were a gift of the class of 1920.

Brother Gabriel directed the first two dramatic productions Cinderella O’Reilly (1951) and Dear Ruth (1952).

Brother Andrew spent his first year at Del (1950–1951) developing a glee club and an orchestra before staging the first of his five annual Gilbert and Sullivan musical productions. The female chorus was made up of soprano-voiced boys from the grade school dressed up as girls. The female leads were played by young ladies from local Catholic high schools. By 1954, Brother Andrew had built the student orchestra to 34 members.

Brother Walter Farrell replaced Brother Andrew as musical director, and in 1958 produced the first of his ten musicals. The popular scores of Richard Rodgers and Oscar Hammerstein counted for eight well-received productions. In 1960, the Toronto Star reviewed Oklahoma with these words:

The hardest thing to keep in mind is that it is a high school show. The quality is consistently far beyond what might be expected, better, in fact, than any university musical.''

The Toronto Telegram reported:

There was a spontaneous joie de vivre...that gave the show a 'refreshing quality sometimes missing from a seasoned professional performance.''

By 1961, boys no longer took female parts as 35 young women took their place with 41 boys from Del to make up the cast of Carousel. That year, the leads accompanied Brother Walter to the backstage of the O’Keefe Centre (now the Sony Centre for the Performing Arts) to meet the composer, Richard Rodgers, who was in Toronto on a promotional tour.

Following the departure of Brother Walter, Del began a 19-year period (1969–1987) in which not only a musical, but also a drama was staged almost every year. The success over so many years of top-rated productions is certainly due to the dedicated directors of musical and dramatic productions, choreographers, set designers, and costume and make-up artists who volunteered countless hours of their time and shared their passion for the performing arts with the boys and girls who took to the stage.

During the 1980s and early 1990s, Theatre De La Salle thrived under the direction of Ben Cekuta. Memorable productions of West Side Story (1980), Carousel (1981), All About Eve (1982), Jesus Christ Superstar (1983), Applause (1984), Man of La Mancha (1985), Dracula (1985), Camelot (1986) and Godspell (1987) cemented Del productions among Toronto's finest. The school flood of 1989 damaged the auditorium so badly that the theatre was closed for three years. It wasn't until 1993 that the theatre reopened its doors and the stage was put to use again.

In 1998, DELTA (Del Theatre Arts) was established and gave students the opportunity to take a leadership role in the theatre production process. Student directors Luke Arnott and Robert Kim went on to direct some of the private school's more memorable productions, including Little Shop of Horrors (1999) and Twelve Angry Men (2002). Classically trained drama teacher Glenn Cherny directed several dramas, including The Importance of Being Earnest (2006) and Pygmalion (2008).

In 2010, Del alumnus Michael Luchka (Class of ’93) revived the original Theatre De La Salle. With unprecedented support from the Administration, Parents Association, and Del Alumni, Theatre De La Salle launched a new era with Andrew Lloyd Webber and Tim Rice's Joseph and the Amazing Technicolor Dreamcoat (2012), and went on to flourish with Back to the 80s (2013), Grease (2014), and The Wizard of Oz (2015). The Theatre's 65th anniversary production was Disney's Beauty and the Beast (2016). 2017 will revisit the school's first musical from 1952 - Gilbert and Sullivan's swashbuckling comedy farce The Pirates of Penzance.

== Notable alumni ==
- Carl Brewer, NHL Defenceman Toronto Maple Leafs 1958–1980
- Robert Chisholm, vice chair, retired, Bank of Nova Scotia
- Tony Comper, '63, president and chief executive officer, retired, Bank of Montreal
- Andy Curran, musician
- Steven Del Duca, politician, Leader of Liberal Party of Ontario 2020–2022,
- Red Green, '18, NHL Forward 1923–1929
- Kris Draper, '90, NHL Forward Detroit Red Wings 1990 to 2011
- John D'Amico, NHL Referee / Linesman, Member Hockey Hall of Fame, 1937–2005
- Rishi Ganjoo, '91, frontman of the Toronto-based rock trio Danko Jones
- Jamal Mayers, NHL Forward St. Louis Blues, 1996–2007 Toronto Maple Leafs 2008, Calgary Flames 2010, Chicago Blackhawks 2011–2013
- Dennis O'Connor, Associate Chief Justice – Ontario Superior Court of Justice, Judge – Court of Appeal for Ontario
- Dennis T. O'Connor, Archbishop of Toronto 1899–1908
- Richard Park, '94, NHL Forward New York Islanders 1994–1996, Anaheim Ducks 1997–1998, Philadelphia Flyers 1999, Minnesota Wild 2001–2004, Vancouver Canucks 2005, New York Islanders 2006–2010, Pittsburgh Penguins 2012
- Keanu Reeves, actor
- Tim Ryan, '56, sportscaster for CBS Sports
- Sidney James "Sid" Smith, '44, NHL forward Toronto Maple Leafs 1946–1958
- Thomas Sutton, chairman, president and chief executive officer, retired Pacific Life Insurance Company
- Major Frederick Albert Tilston, VC, '24, former De La Salle cadet and Canadian war hero Victoria Cross recipient (the highest award in the Commonwealth for gallantry in the face of the enemy)
- Mike Wadsworth, Canadian Football League, Toronto Argonauts, athletic director Notre Dame University, former Canadian Ambassador to the Republic of Ireland
- Thomas Woods, '71, vice chairman, retired Canadian Imperial Bank of Commerce
- Gerry Dee, '88, comedian, NBC (Last Comic Standing) 2007, broadcaster, The Score Television Network, "Mr. D" sitcom, CBC Television
- Joseph Giordmaine, 52', notable Canadian physicist
- Joe Volpe, '66, Federal Member of Parliament, Cabinet Minister, Leadership Candidate, 1988–2011

== See also ==
- Education in Ontario
- Lasallian educational institutions
- List of secondary schools in Ontario
