= La Salle High School =

La Salle High School is the name of several educational institutions affiliated with the Institute of the Brothers of the Christian Schools, also known as the Lasallian Brothers, a Roman Catholic religious teaching order founded by French Priest Saint Jean-Baptiste de la Salle:

- Lasallian educational institutions

La Salle High School may also refer to the following educational institutions:

== Canada ==
- LaSalle Community Comprehensive High School, in LaSalle, Quebec
- La Salle Secondary School, in Kingston, Ontario

== Japan ==
- Hakodate La Salle High School
- La Salle High School (Kagoshima, Japan)

== Malaysia ==
- La Salle School, Brickfields, in Brickfields, Kuala Lumpur
- La Salle School, Klang, Selangor
- La Salle High School (Petaling Jaya), in Petaling Jaya, Selangor
- La Salle Secondary School, Kota Kinabalu, Sabah

== Pakistan ==
- La Salle High School Multan, in Multan, Punjab, Pakistan

== Philippines ==
- La Salle Green Hills, in Mandaluyong

== United States ==
- La Salle High School (Pasadena, California)
- La Salle High School, Cedar Rapids, Iowa, now Xavier High School
- La Salle High School (Miami, Florida)
- La Salle High School, in Olla, Louisiana
- La Salle High School (Niagara Falls, New York)
- La Salle High School (Cincinnati, Ohio)
- La Salle High School (Milwaukie, Oregon)
- La Salle High School (Union Gap, Washington)
- La Salle Academy, New York City, a private high school, also referred to as La Salle Academy High School
- La Salle College High School, in Wyndmoor, Pennsylvania
- LaSalle-Peru High School, in LaSalle, Illinois

== See also ==
- De La Salle High School (disambiguation)
