= List of De La Salle University people =

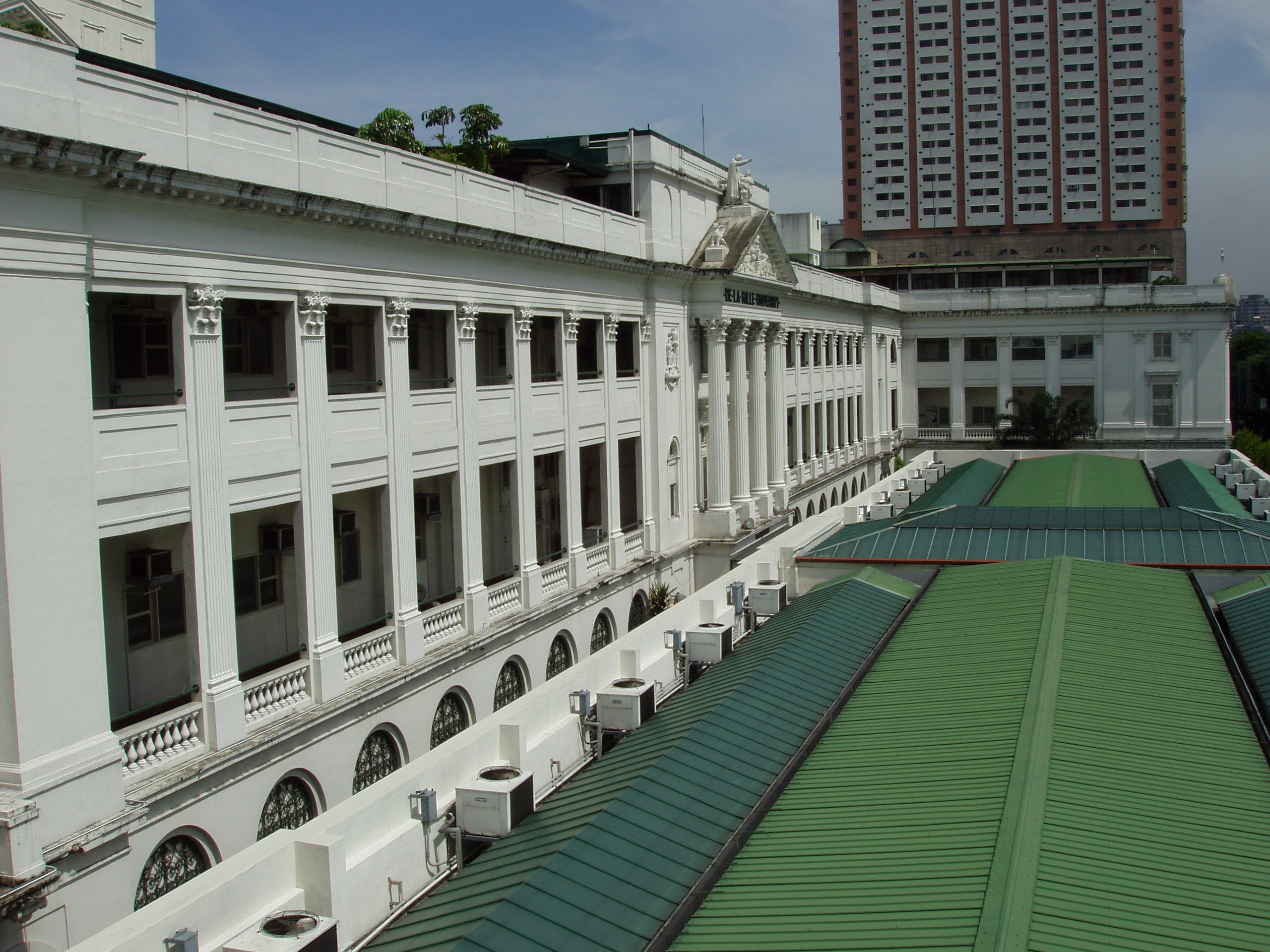
St La Salle Hall, called "DLSU's most historic building" by The LaSallian

De La Salle University (Tagalog: Pamantasang De La Salle) (DLSU) is a Catholic private Lasallian university in Malate, Manila, Philippines. It was founded in 1911 by De La Salle Brothers as the De La Salle College in Paco, Manila with Blimond Pierre serving as its first director. DLSU traces its founding to Manila Archbishop Jeremiah James Harty. He believed that the establishment of a La Salle school in Manila was instrumental in preempting the spread of Protestantism in the Philippines through the arrival of the Thomasites and Protestant missions. His request would later be endorsed in 1907 by Pope Pius X. An envoy of De La Salle Brothers arrived in 1910.

More than a century ago, the De La Salle College (DLSC) was established as an exclusive all boys' elementary and high school. The pre-war grade school and high school departments of DLSC were finally dissolved in 1968 and 1978, respectively. DLSU currently offers coeducational undergraduate and graduate degree programs through its seven colleges and one school specializing in varied disciplines, including business, engineering, computer sciences, education and liberal arts. DLSU, granted university status in February 1975, is the oldest constituent of De La Salle Philippines (DLSP), a network of 16 Lasallian institutions established in 2006 to replace the De La Salle University System.

The Lasallians affiliated with De La Salle University include over 100,000 alumni, 888 faculty, honorary degree recipients and university administrators. Among them are National Artists of the Philippines, Ramon Magsaysay Awardees, officials of the Catholic Church and the government of the Philippines.

== Alumni and faculty ==
=== Alumni ===
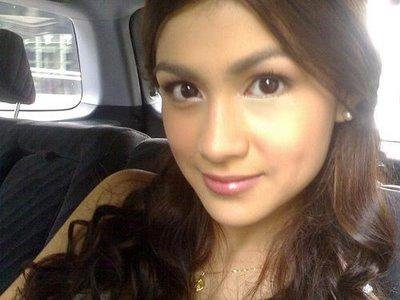
Carla Abellana

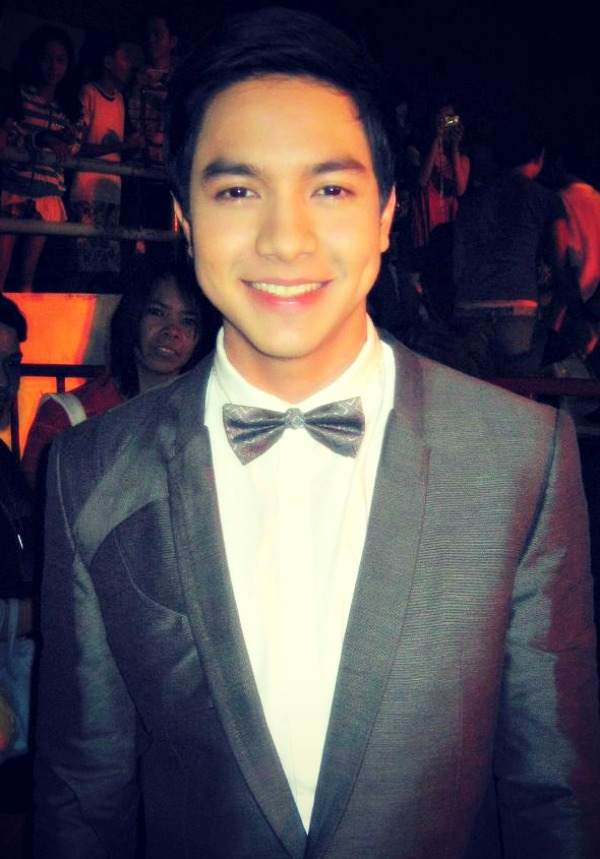
Alden Richards

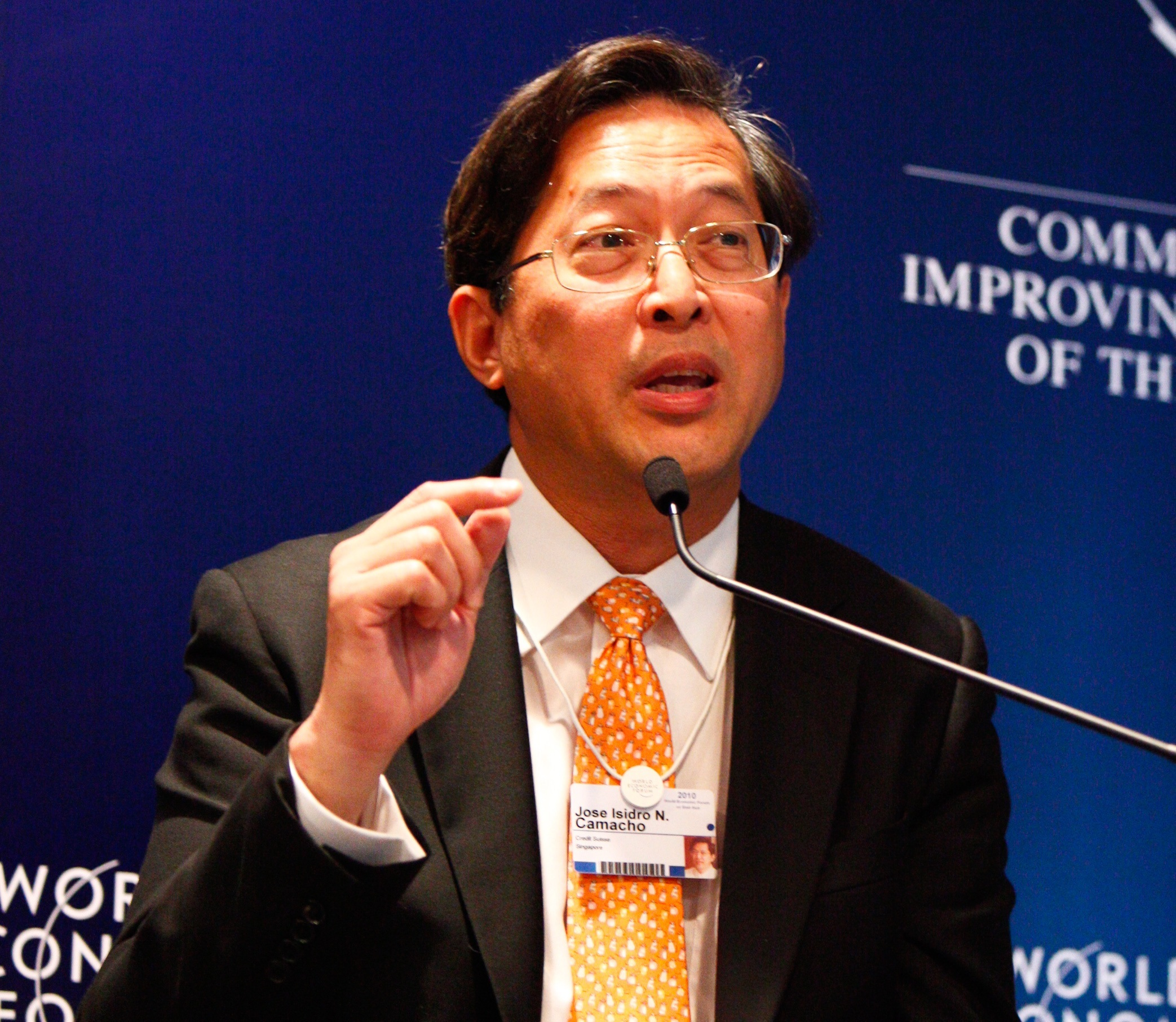
Jose Isidro Camacho

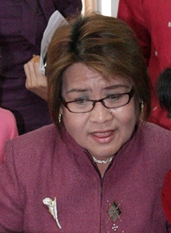
Leila de Lima

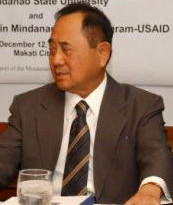
Jose de Venecia, Jr.

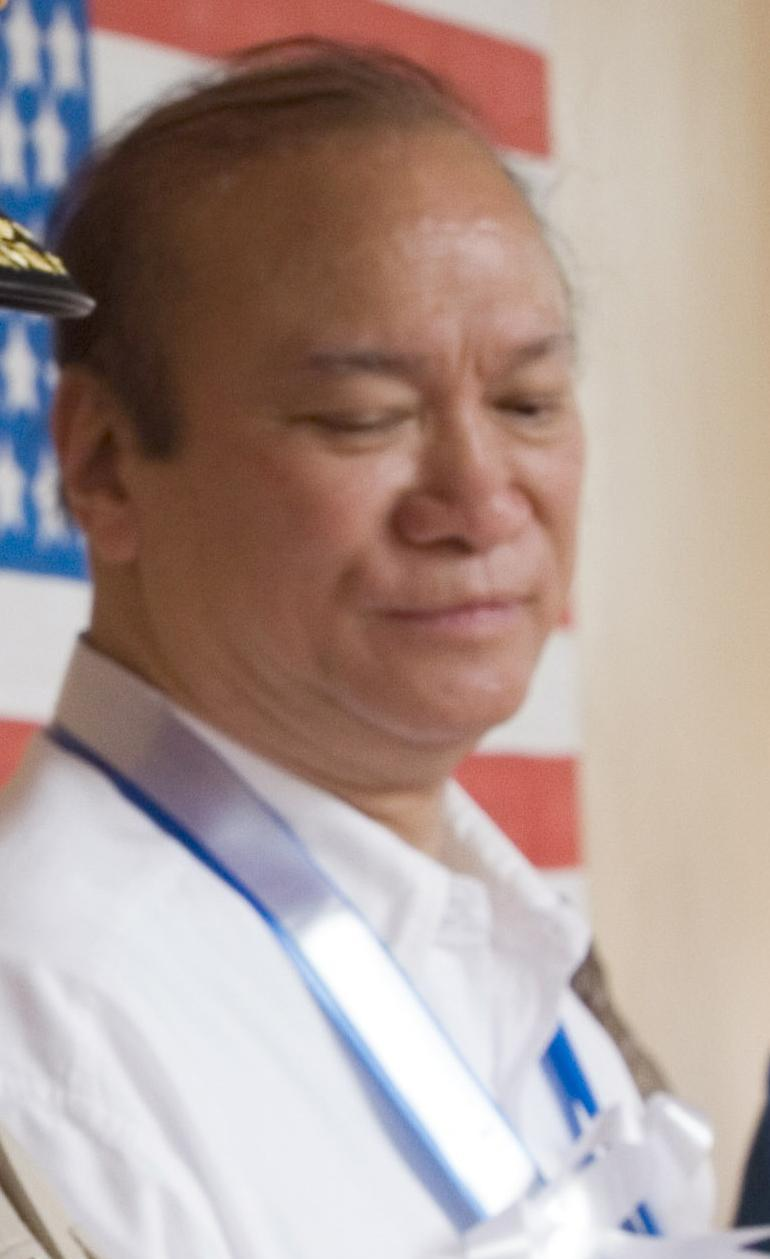
Ramon B. Magsaysay, Jr.

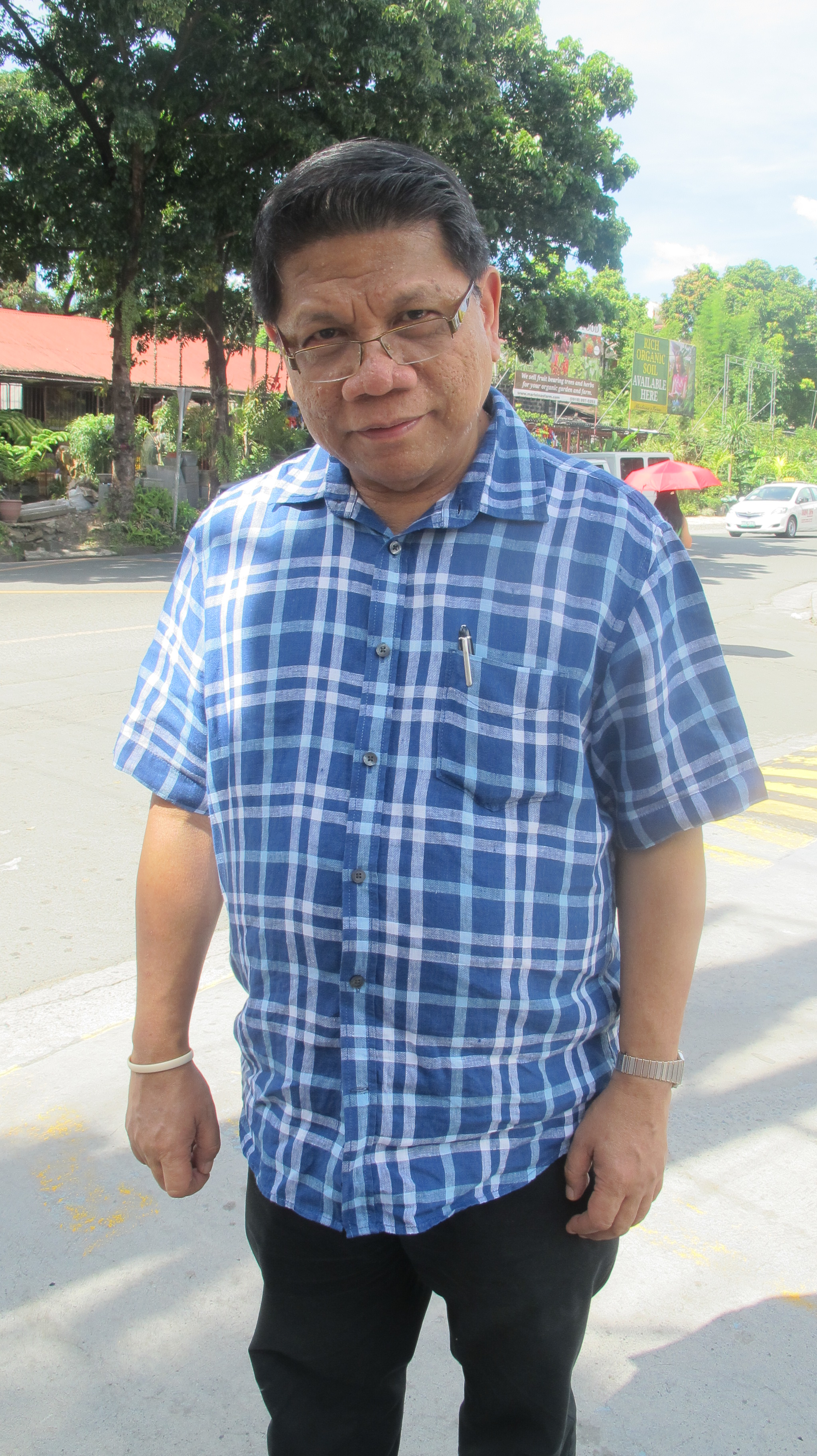
Mike Enriquez

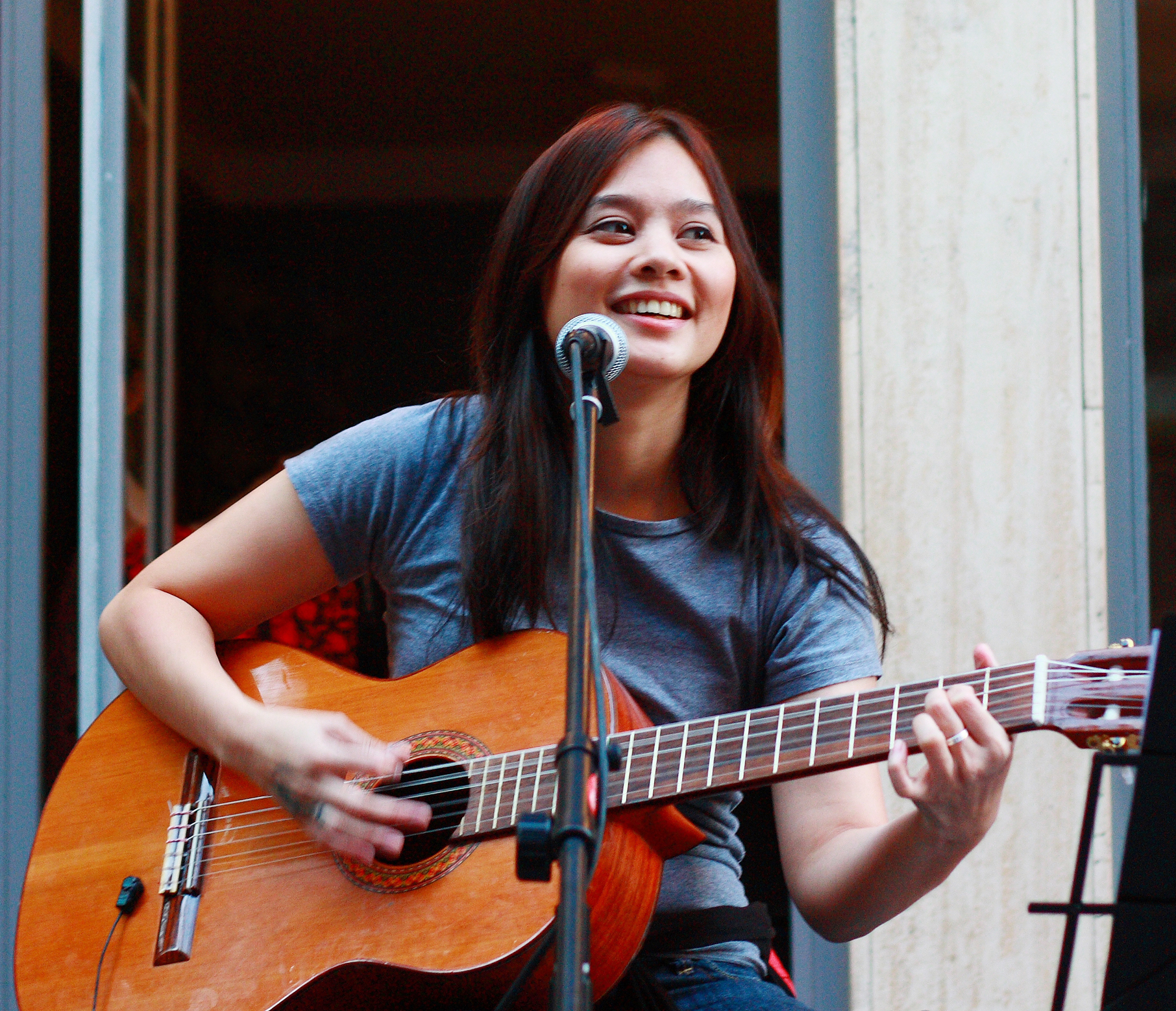
Kitchie Nadal

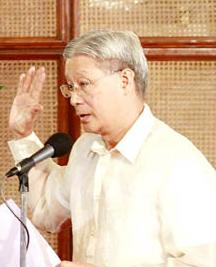
Cayetano Paderanga, Jr.

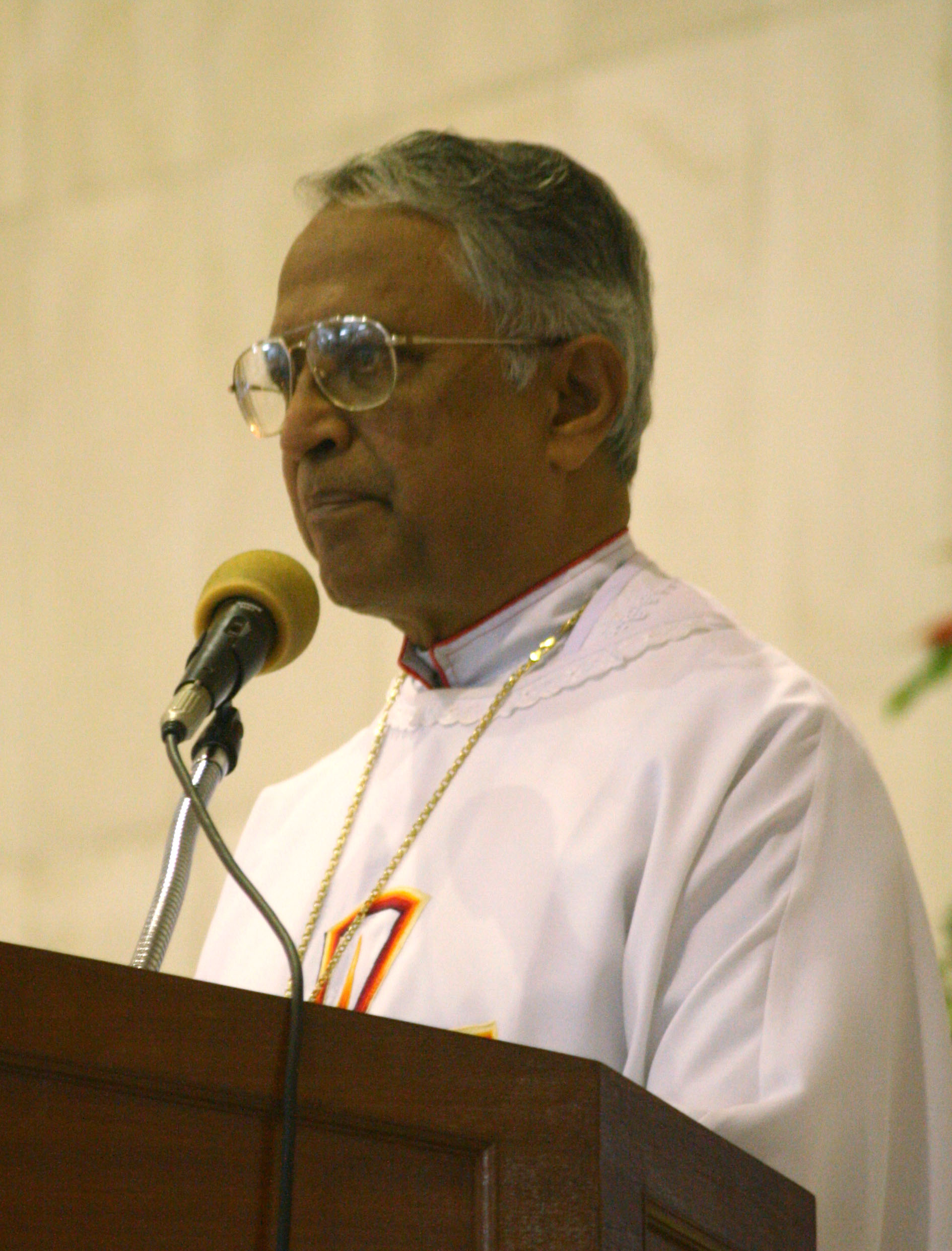
Murphy Nicholas Xavier Pakiam

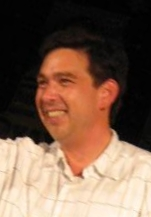
Ralph Recto

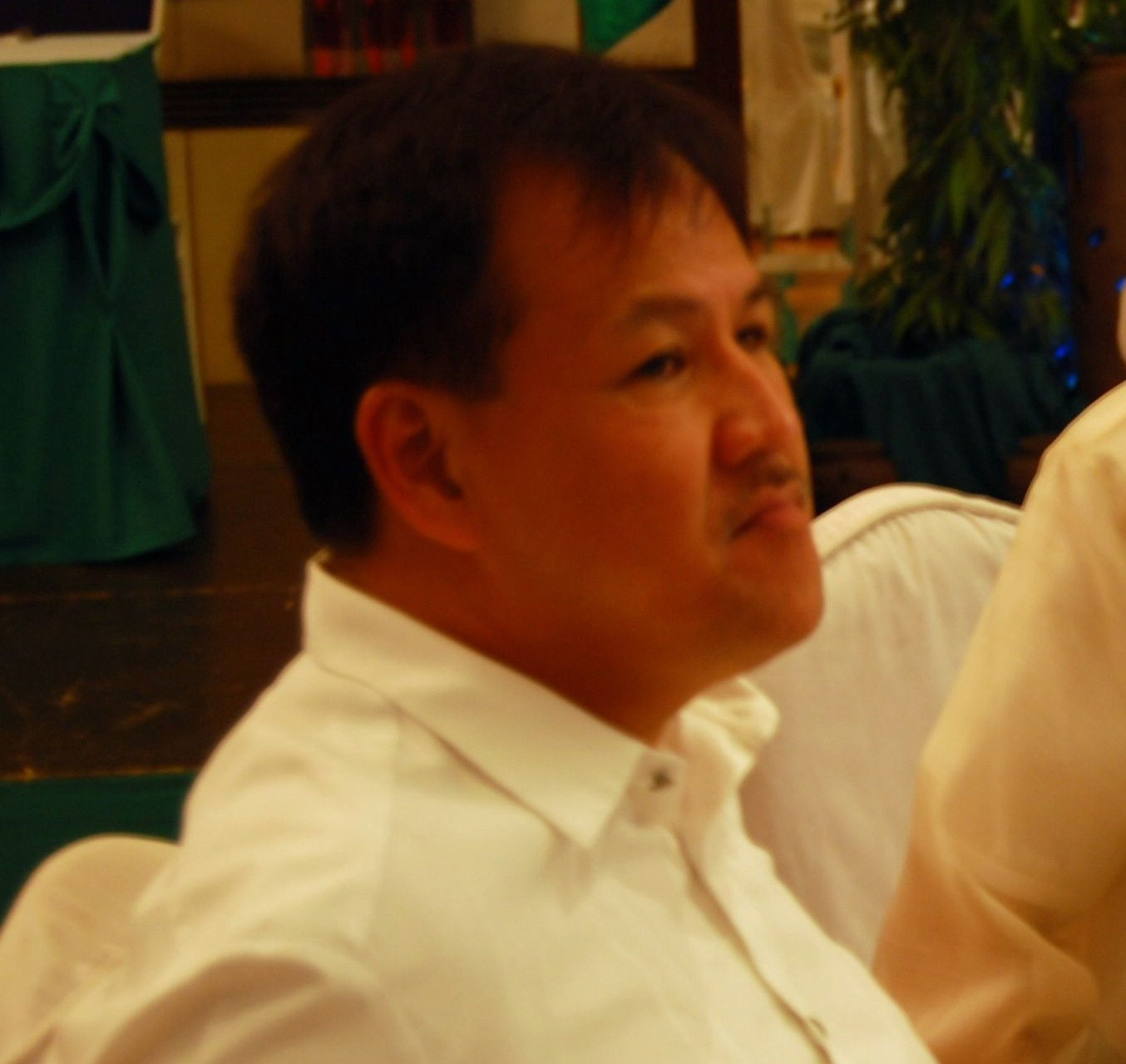
Jesse Robredo

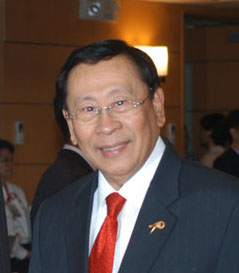
Alberto Romulo

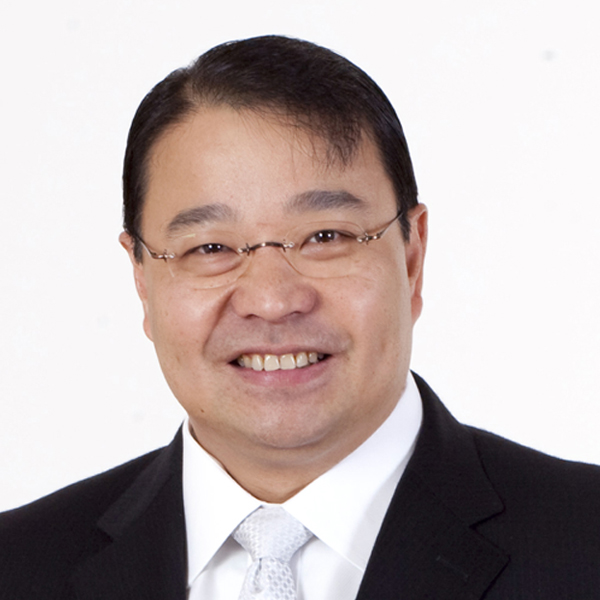
Lorenzo V. Tan

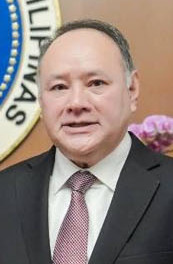
Gilbert Teodoro

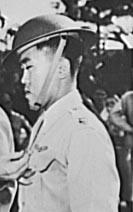
Jesús A. Villamor

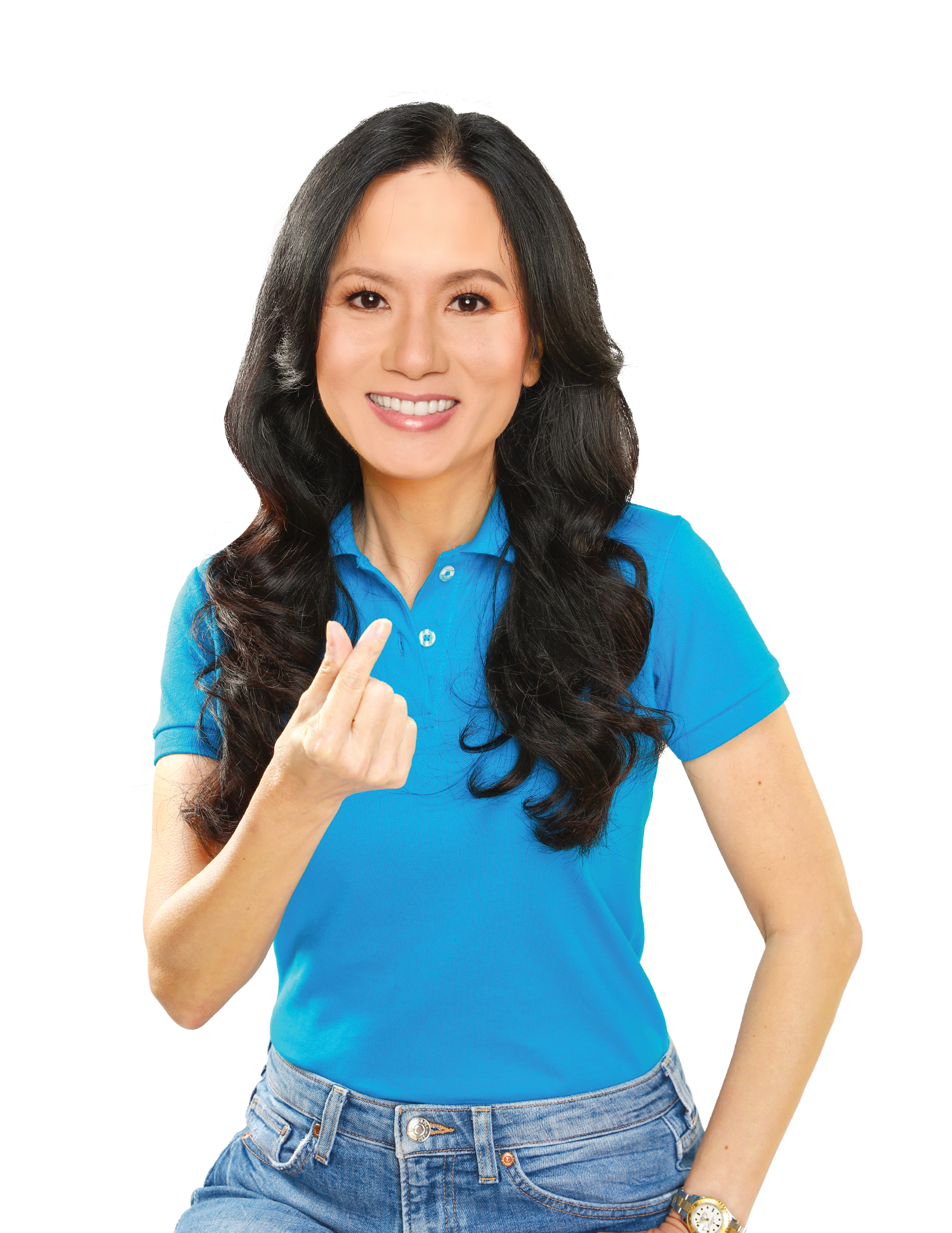
Jeannie Sandoval

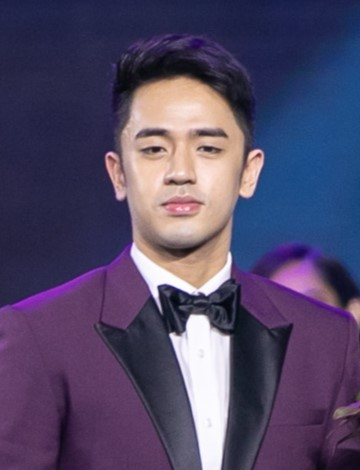
David Licauco

Fields with a – are unknown; NA – not applicable

Name	Relationship	Discipline	Known for	Notes
Benhur Abalos		History and political science	Member of the House of Representatives of the Philippines 2004–2007, mayor of Mandaluyong (1998–2004, 2007–2016)	
Andi Abaya	—	Advertising management	Actress	
Carla Abellana		Psychology (AB-PSM) cum laude	Actress	
Ogie Alcasid	—	—	TV host, songwriter, actor	
Don Allado	—	—	Philippine Basketball Association player	
Rafael Alunan III		Business administration and history	Department of the Interior and Local Government secretary 1992–1996	
Rolando Andaya, Jr.		Business and economics	Member of the House of Representatives of the Philippines	
Darlene Antonino-Custodio		Management	Mayor of General Santos	
Ryan Araña	—	—	Philippine Basketball Association player	
Drew Arellano		Marketing management	Actor, TV host	
Aaron Atayde		Communication arts	Sportscaster	
Arjo Atayde		Entrepreneurship	Actor, politician	
Mary Joy Baron	—	—	UAAP Season 79 Women's Volleyball Most Valuable Player, middle blocker for the Philippines women's national volleyball team	
Joseph Bernardo		Business administration	Ambassador of the Philippines to Spain	
Hernani Braganza		History	Department of Agrarian Reform secretary 2001–2003	
Rafael Buenaventura		Commerce	Central Bank of the Philippines governor 1999–2005	
Junjun Cabatu	—	—	Philippine Basketball Association player	
Jose Isidro Camacho		Mathematics	Department of Finance secretary 2001–2003	
Mark Cardona		—	Philippine Basketball Association player	
Eduardo Cojuangco, Jr.	Secondary	NA	Chairman of San Miguel Corporation	
David Consunji	Secondary	NA	Department of Public Works, Transportation and Communications secretary 1971–1975	
Mike Cortez	—	—	Philippine Basketball Association player	
Elsa Martinez Coscolluela	Graduate	Literature	Vice president for academic affairs of University of St. La Salle	
Leila de Lima		History and political science	Former Department of Justice secretary, former senator, incumbent partylist representative	
Jose de Venecia, Jr.	Secondary	NA	Speaker of the House of Representatives of the Philippines 1992–1998 and 2005–2008	
Enchong Dee		Development studies	ABS-CBN Star Magic celebrity	
Monsour del Rosario		Arts	Taekwondo practitioner, former member of the House of Representatives	
Kisses Delavin	—	Accountancy (now Business Administration)	Actress, beauty queen, brand endorser, singer and model	
Jose W. Diokno		Commerce	Senator of the Philippines 1963–1972	
Joseph Victor Ejercito		Political science	Member of the House of Representatives of the Philippines	
Mike Enriquez		Commerce	GMA VP radio and TV journalist	
Eileen Ermita-Buhain		Psychology	Member of the House of Representatives of the Philippines	
Cheryl Fuerte		Computer science	Web designer	
Jerwin Gaco	Graduate	—	Philippine Basketball Association player	
Peque Gallaga	Secondary	NA	Film director	
Albert S. Garcia		Philosophy	Member of the House of Representatives	
Tet Garcia		Accountancy and economics	Governor of Bataan 1992–1994	
John Gokongwei	Graduate	Business administration	Chairman of JG Summit Holdings	
John Paul Gomez		Mechanical engineering	Chess grandmaster	
Armando Goyena		Commerce	Actor	
Quinito Henson		East Asian studies and economics	Sports analyst	
Niña Jose-Quiambao		European studies	Actress and politician	
Philip Juico		Business	Sports official	
Edwin Lacierda		Communication arts	Spokesperson of President of the Philippines Benigno Aquino III	
Salvador Laurel	Secondary	NA	Vice president of the Philippines 1986–1992	
David Licauco		Marketing Management	GMA Network actor, model	
Lim Eng Beng		—	Philippine Basketball Association player	
Jun Limpot		—	Philippine Basketball Association player	
Japoy Lizardo		—	Taekwondo practitioner	
Leandro Locsin	Secondary	NA	National Artist of the Philippines for architecture	
Teodoro Locsin, Jr.	Secondary	NA	Former member of the House of Representatives of the Philippines, incumbent Secretary of Foreign Affairs	
Mara Lopez		Communication arts	Actress	
Ramon Magsaysay, Jr.	Secondary	NA	Former senator of the Philippines	
Tommy Manotoc	Secondary	NA	Philippine Basketball Association coach	
Edu Manzano	Elementary	NA	Actor, TV host	
Florencio Miraflores		Industrial engineering	Member of the House of Representatives of the Philippines	
Kitchie Nadal		Education and psychology	Singer	
Roselle Nava		Marketing Management	ABS-CBN diva, singer	
Paeng Nepomuceno	—	—	Bowler	
Sam Oh		International studies	Talk show host	
Jennifer Olayvar	U	International studies	Ballerina	
Sergio Osmeña III	Secondary	NA	Senator of the Philippines	
Cayetano Paderanga, Jr.		Accountancy	National Economic and Development Authority director-general	
Murphy Nicholas Xavier Pakiam	Graduate	Counselling	Roman Catholic Archbishop of Kuala Lumpur	
Francis Pangilinan		Accounting	Senator of the Philippines	
Prospero Pichay, Jr.		Commerce	Member of the House of Representatives of the Philippines 1998–2007	
Monico Puentevella		Political science	Member of the House of Representatives of the Philippines	
Ralph Recto		Business Administration	Senator of the Philippines	
Gilbert Remulla	Elementary	NA	2010 Philippine Senate election candidate	
José Javier Reyes		Literature	Film director	
LJ Reyes		Commerce	Actress	
Mark Reyes		Communication Arts	Television and film director	
Alden Richards		Marketing Management	GMA Network actor, model	
Ren-Ren Ritualo		Bachelor of early childhood education, major in guidance counseling and child psychology	Philippine Basketball Association player	
Jesse Robredo		Industrial management and mechanical engineering	Department of the Interior and Local Government secretary	
Mariel Rodriguez		Bachelor of Arts in Philippine Studies, major in Filipinos in Mass Media	Actress	
Alberto Romulo		Accountancy	Department of Foreign Affairs secretary 2004–2011	
Jeannie Sandoval		Computer science	Incumbent mayor of Malabon, vice mayor of Malabon 2013–2019	
Randy Santiago		Communication Arts	Songwriter, actor, comedian	
Sebastian Francis Shah	Graduate	Counselling	Auxiliary bishop of the Roman Catholic Archdiocese of Lahore	
Carlo Sharma	—	—	Philippine Basketball Association player	
Rogelio Singson	Graduate	Public and business management	Department of Public Works and Highways secretary	
Lorenzo V. Tan	Graduate	Commerce, major in Accounting	Banker, Bankers Association of the Philippines president	
Tyrone Tang		Business management	Philippine Basketball Association player	
Mark Telan	—	—	Philippine Basketball Association player	
Gilbert Teodoro		Commerce	Secretary of Department of National Defense since 2023 and previously 2007–2010; former member of the Philippine House of Representatives from Tarlac	
John Iremil Teodoro	Graduate	Fine arts	Literary writer	
Antonio Trillanes IV		Electronics and communications engineering	Senator of the Philippines	
TJ Trinidad		Commerce	Actor	
Jong Uichico	—	—	Philippine Basketball Association coach	
Gary Valenciano	—	—	Dancer, songwriter, TV host	
Luis R. Villafuerte, Jr.		Political science	Governor of Camarines Sur	
Jesús A. Villamor		Arts	World War II USAFFE ace fighter pilot	
Iya Villania		Psychology	Actress, TV host, and VJ	
Martin Villarama		Business administration	Supreme Court of the Philippines justice	
Bernardo Villegas		Commerce and humanities	Founder of University of Asia and the Pacific	
Jason Webb	—	—	Philippine Basketball League player	
Pinky Webb		Psychology	Newscaster	
Willy Wilson	—	—	Philippine Basketball Association player	
Rico Yan		Business management	Actor	
Joseph Yeo	—	—	Philippine Basketball Association player	
Francis Zamora		Psychology	Mayor, San Juan, Metro Manila	
Ronaldo Zamora	Secondary	NA	Executive secretary to President of the Philippines Joseph Estrada	
Jose Zubiri, Jr.		Management	Governor of Bukidnon	

=== Faculty ===
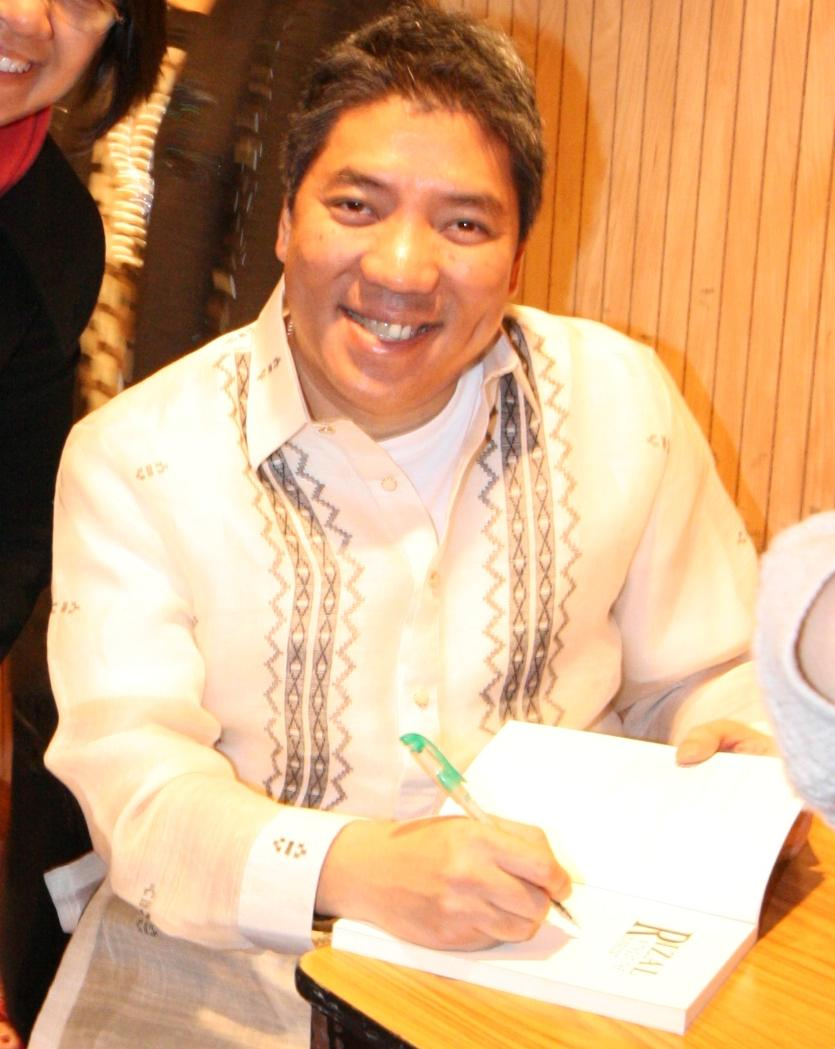
Ambeth Ocampo

Name	Relationship	Discipline	Known for	Notes
Heber Bartolome	Former professor	Literature	Musician	
Cirilo Bautista	Professor	Literature	Literary writer	
Josette Biyo	Professor	Biology	Biologist	
Albert Casuga	Professor	Literature	Literary writer	
Xiao Chua	Professor	History	Historian, academic, and television personality	
Isagani R. Cruz	Professor emeritus	Literature	Literary writer	
Chel Diokno	School of Law founding dean and professor	Law	Human rights lawyer	
Marjorie Evasco	Professor	Literature	Poet	
Rico Hizon	Former lecturer	Broadcast journalism	BBC newscaster	
Bienvenido Lumbera	Professor	Literature	National Artist of the Philippines for Literature	
Ambeth Ocampo	Professor	History	National Historical Commission of the Philippines chairman	
Vicente Paterno	Former lecturer	Business administration	Senator of the Philippines 1987–1992	
Louie Jon A. Sanchez	Professor	Literature	Named Poet of the Year by the Commission on the Filipino Language	
Julio Teehankee	Professor	Political Science	Dean of the College of Liberal Arts	

== Honorary degree recipients ==
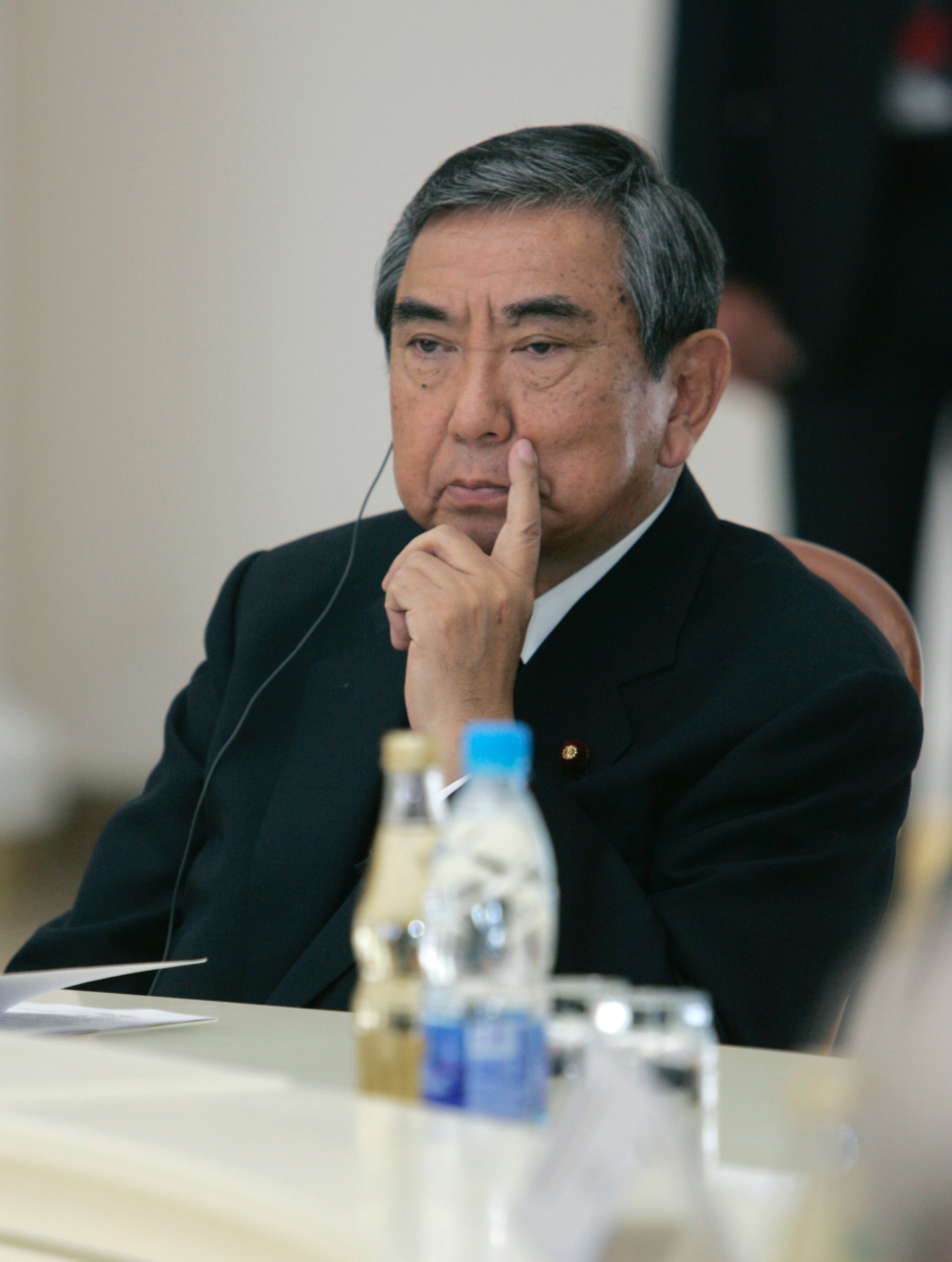
Yōhei Kōno

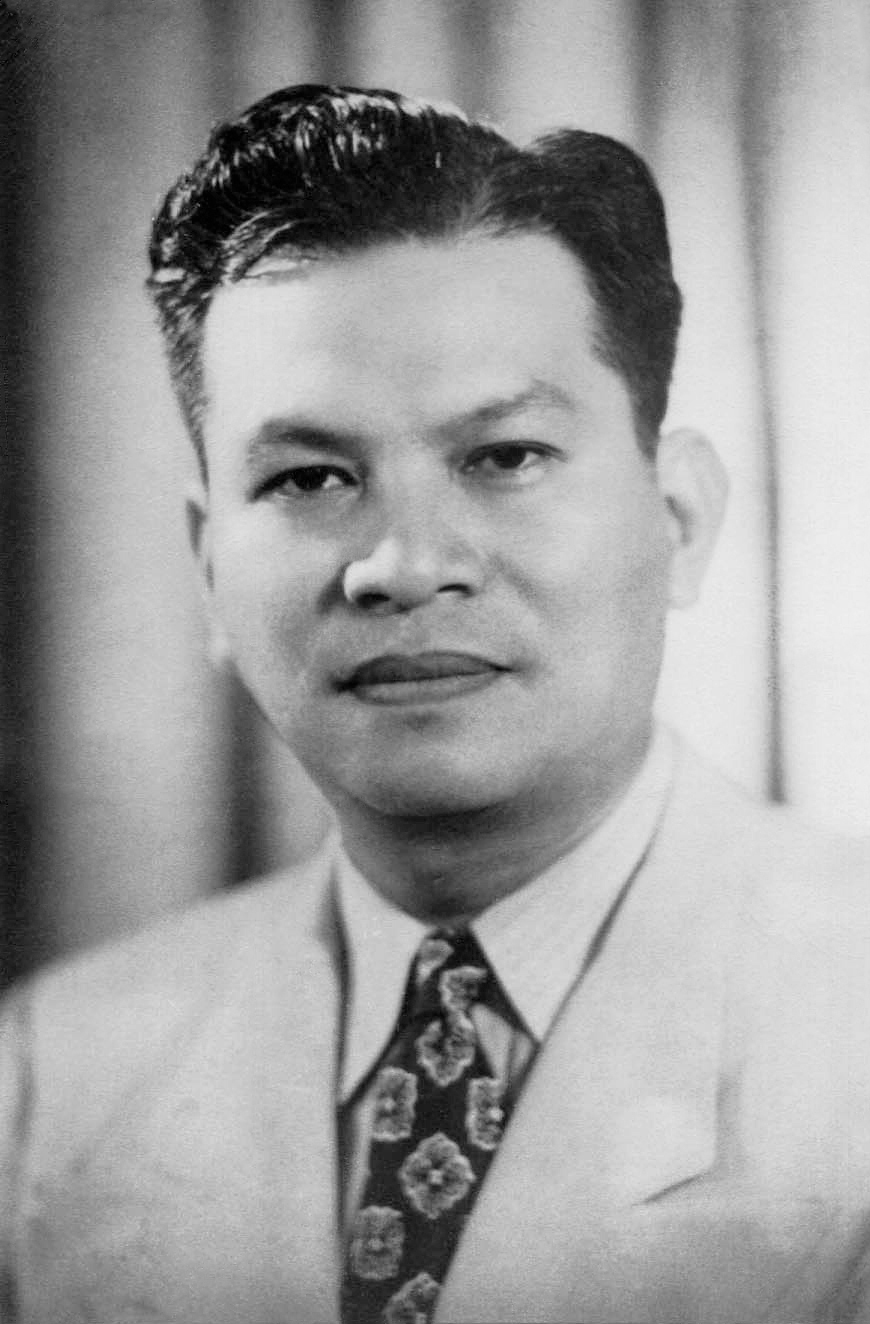
Ramon Magsaysay

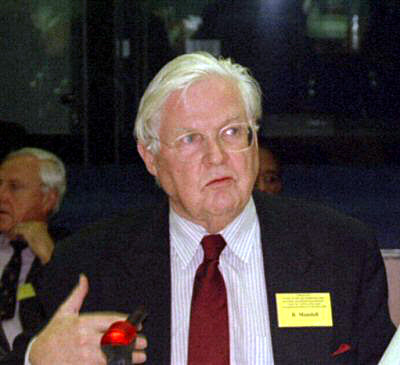
Robert Mundell

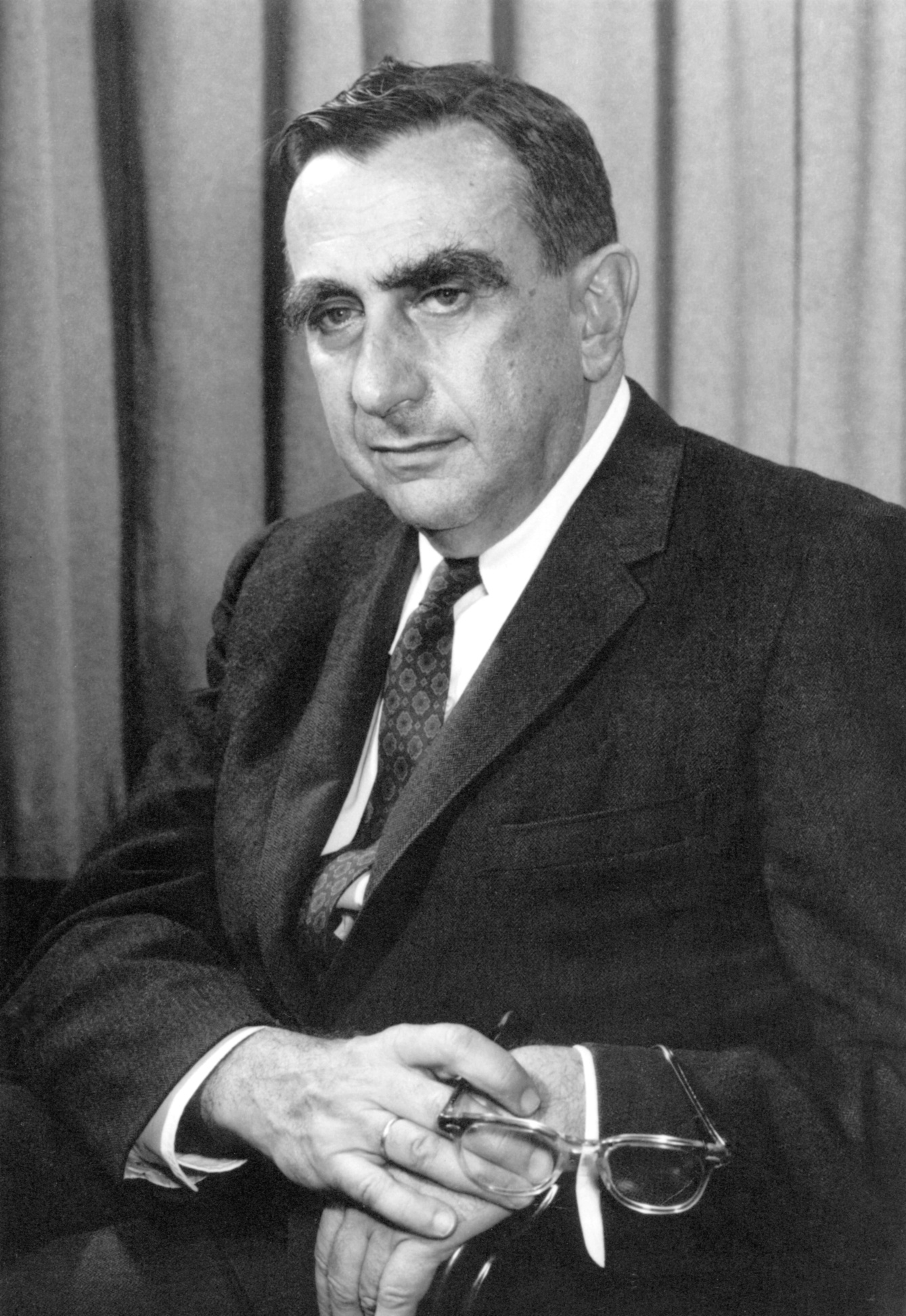
Edward Teller

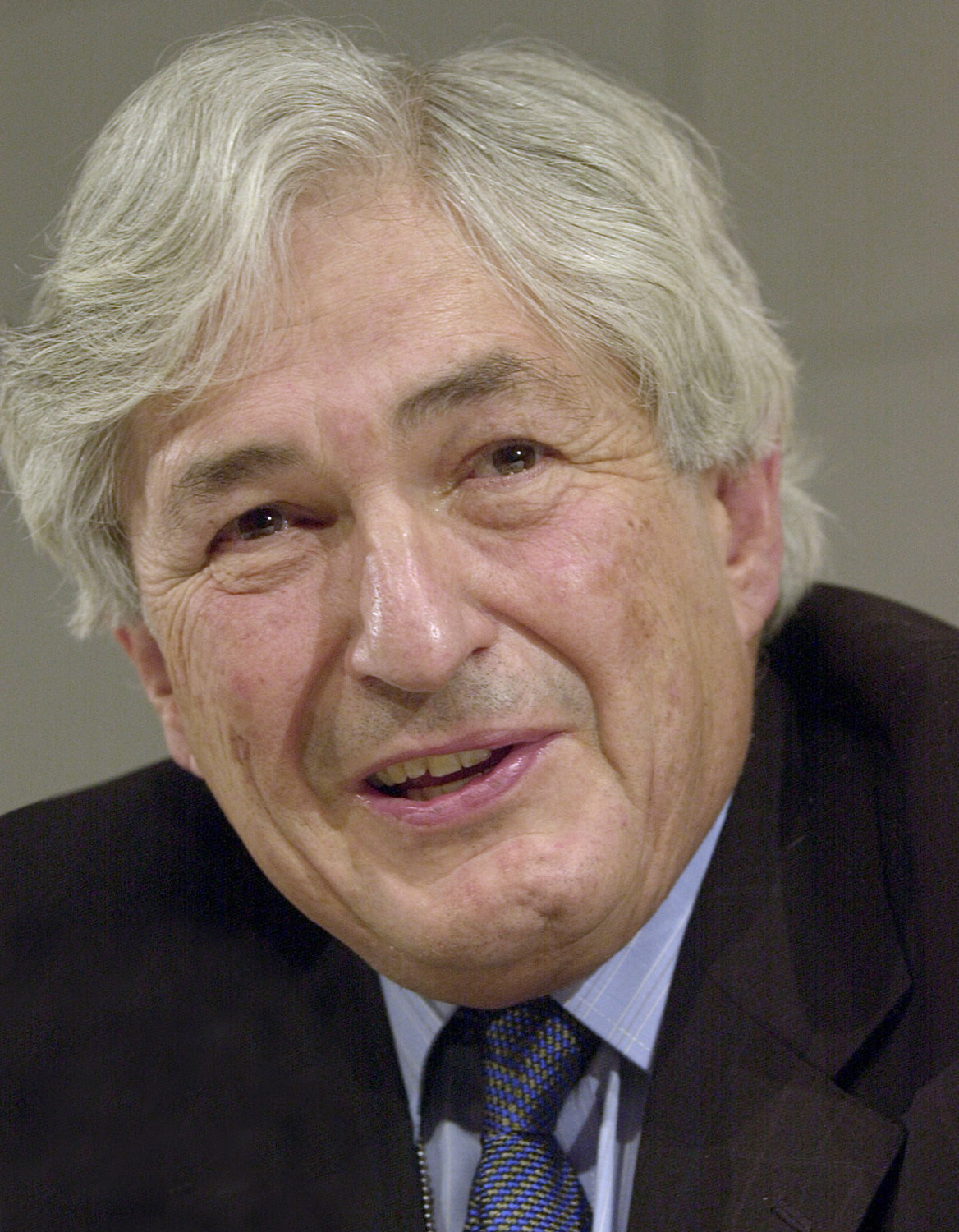
James Wolfensohn

DA – Doctor of Arts; DBM – Doctor of Business Management; EdD – Doctor of Education; LHD – Doctor of Humane Letters; DHum – Doctor of Humanities; LLD – Doctor of Laws; LittD – Doctor of Letters; DMgt – Doctor of Management; DNatSc – Doctor of Natural Science; PedD – Doctor of Pedagogy; PhD – Doctor of Philosophy; ScD – Doctor of Science

Name	Degree	Year	Known for	Notes
Ismail Mohamed Ali	DMgt	1993	Governor of Bank Negara Malaysia 1962–1980	
Edgardo Angara	Doctor of Educational Management	1989	Senator of the Philippines	
Angelo Caloia	PhD	1997	President of Vatican Bank 1989–2009	
Hilario Davide, Jr.	LLD	2001	Chief justice of the Supreme Court of the Philippines 1998–2005	
Roberto De Ocampo	PhD	1996	Department of Finance secretary 1992–1998	
Álvaro Rodríguez Echeverría	DHum	2010	Superior general of the Institute of the Brothers of the Christian Schools	
Marcelo Fernan	DMgt	1991	Only person to become both president of the Senate of the Philippines and chief justice of the Supreme Court of the Philippines	
David Gross	ScD	2008	2004 Nobel Prize in Physics laureate	
Pilar Hidalgo-Lim	PedD	1964	Women's rights advocate	
Joseph Höffner	DMgt	1986	Archbishop of Cologne 1969–1987	
Daisaku Ikeda	LHD	1997	Leader of Sōka Gakkai	
Khir Johari	EdD	1967	First minister of education of Malaysia	
F. Sionil José	PhD	1995	1980 Ramon Magsaysay Awardee for Literature	
Toshiki Kaifu	DMgt	1991	Prime minister of Japan 1989–1991	
Yōhei Kōno	PhD	2003	Speaker of the House of Representatives of Japan from 2003 to 2008	
Ramon Magsaysay	LLD and LittD	1957	President of the Philippines 1953–1957	
Robert Mundell	DHum	2007	1999 Nobel Memorial Prize in Economic Sciences laureate	
Cecilia Muñoz-Palma	LHD	1987	First female Supreme Court of the Philippines justice	
Bienvenido Nebres	ScD	2004	President of Ateneo de Manila University 1993–2011	
Eugene Nida	LHD	1985	Developer of the functional equivalence method of Bible translation	
José Ramos-Horta	DHum	2009	President of East Timor	
Carlos P. Romulo	ScD	1964	President of the UN General Assembly in 1940 and 1950	
Julio Rosales	DHum	1966	Archbishop of Cebu 1949–1982	
Bienvenido Santos	DA	1990	Literary writer	
Rufino Jiao Santos	Doctor of Ecclesiastical Finance	1958	First Filipino cardinal	
Jaime Sin	LHD	1975	Archbishop of Manila 1974–2003	
Chatri Sophonpanich	DBM	1986	Chairman of Bangkok Bank	
Su Nan-cheng	DMgt	1989	1983 Ramon Magsaysay awardee for Government Service	
Henry Sy	ScD	1999	Owner of SM Investments Corporation	
Washington SyCip	PhD	1977	1992 Ramon Magsaysay awardee for International Understanding	
Edmund Szoka	Doctor of Financial Management	1990	President emeritus of the Pontifical Commission for Vatican City State	
Lorenzo Tañada	EdD	1968	Senator of the Philippines 1948–1971	
Jean-Louis Tauran	DHum	2001	President of Pontifical Council for Interreligious Dialogue	
Edward Teller	DNatSc	1981	Inventor of the hydrogen bomb	
Edith Tiempo	DHum	2001	National Artist of the Philippines for Literature	
Torsten Wiesel	ScD	2010	1981 Nobel Prize in Physiology or Medicine laureate	
James Wolfensohn	DHum	2008	President of the World Bank 1999–2005	
Manuel T. Yan	DHum	2008	Youngest person to be appointed as chief of staff of the Armed Forces of the Philippines	
Yong Pung How	PhD	2003	Chief justice of Singapore 1990–2006	
Alfonso Yuchengco	PhD	1982	Former Philippine representative to the United Nations	
Enrique Zobel	DBM	1983	Former chief executive officer of Ayala Corporation	
Jaime Zobel de Ayala	DBM	1985	Fourth richest person in the Philippines as of 2010	

== Presidents ==
De La Salle University has had 21 presidents, including two acting presidents. The first, Antony Ferdinand Kilbourn, acted in Lucian Athanasius Reinhart's capacity during his return to the United States while the second, another American Brother named Andelino Manuel, completed Reinhart's term of office after he died in 1950.

Presidents
#	Name	Term
1	Blimond Pierre Eilenbecker	1911–1912
2	Goslin Camille Thomas	1912–1915
3	Acisclus Michael Naughter	1915–1919
4	Albinus Peter Graves	1919–1923
3	Acisclus Michael Naughter	1923–1927
5	Celba John Lynam	1927–1930
6	Dorothy Joseph Brophy	1930–1933
7	Marcian James Cullen	1933–1936
8	Flannan Paul Gallagher	1936
9	Egbert Xavier Kelly	1937–1945
10	Lucian Athanasius Reinhart	1945–1950
13	Hyacinth Gabriel Connon	1950–1959
14	Denis of Mary Ruhland	1959–1961
15	Crescentius Richard Duerr	1961–1966
13	Hyacinth Gabriel Connon	1966–1978
16	Andrew Gonzalez	1978–1991
17	Rafael Donato	1991–1994
16	Andrew Gonzalez	1994–1998
18	Rolando Ramos Dizon	1998–2003
19	Carmelita Quebengco	2003–2004
20	Armin Luistro	2004–2011
21	Narciso S. Erguiza	2011–2012
22	Ricky Laguda	2012–2015
23	Raymundo Suplido	2015-present
