= Lorenzo V. Tan =

Filipino banker

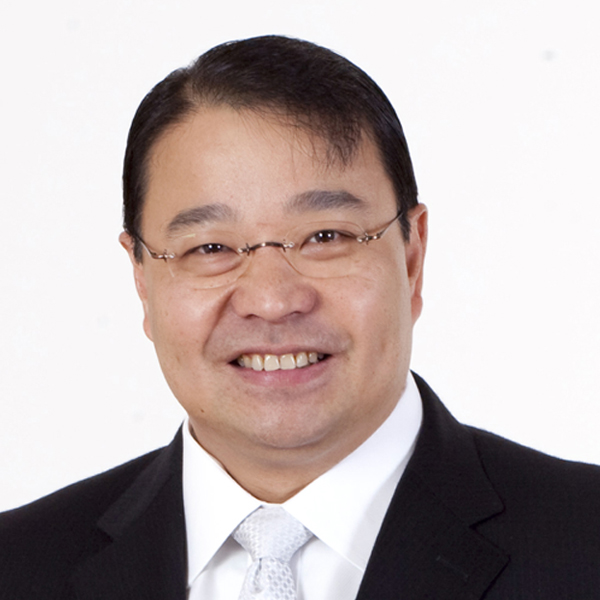
- Born: Lorenzo Villanueva Tan; August 10, 1961 (age 64); Manila, Republic of the Philippines
- Other name: LVT
- Education: Certified Public Accountant (CPA) in Pennsylvania, USA and in the Philippines
- Alma mater: J.L. Kellogg Graduate School of Management, Northwestern University (Master of Management, 1987); De La Salle University (Bachelor of Science, Major in Accounting, 1982)
- Occupations: Banker, CPA
- Known for: Current president and CEO of House of Investments, Inc., Former chairman Asian Bankers Association, Former president Bankers Association of the Philippines, Rizal Commercial Bank Corporation, Philippine National Bank, Sunlife of Canada (Philippines), United Coconut Planters Bank
- Board member of: House of Investments, Petro Energy Corp, EEI, iPeople and Smart Communications
- Parent(s): Rufino Tan; Erlinda Villanueva - Tan
- Awards: Ten Outstanding Young Men (TOYM) for Banking in 1999, 2011 La Sallian Achievement Award, 2006 IABC Insurance CEO of the Year, PeopleAsia 2015 People of the Year Award, PeopleAsia 2016 Men Who Matter Award

Lorenzo Villanueva Tan (born August 10, 1961) is a prominent Filipino banker and former president of the Banker's Association of the Philippines, and chairman of the Asian Bankers Association. At 37 years old, he became the youngest president of a universal bank in the Philippines.

Tan is currently serving as the president and CEO of House of Investments, Inc. of the Yuchengco Group of Companies. He holds the vice chairmanship of the Pan Malayan Management and Investment Corporation (PMMIC), the controlling shareholder of House of Investments, RCBC, and other leading firms.

Tan is the former president and CEO of the Yuchengco-owned publicly listed bank, Rizal Commercial Banking Corporation. Prior to that, he also served as the president and CEO of the largest life insurer in the Philippines, Sun Life of Canada (Philippines), Inc., another publicly listed universal bank, the Philippine National Bank; the fourth largest universal bank in the Philippines, and the United Coconut Planters Bank.

Tan is the son of Philippine Constitutional Association governor Rufino R. Tan and the brother of current Banker's Association of the Philippines, and Banco de Oro Unibank president Nestor V. Tan.

He is known in the banking industry as "Mr. Turnaround" for his knack of improving the economic performances of the various corporations he has headed.

In February 2017, he joined leading Manila-based investment advisory firm Primeiro Partners as a board advisor. Stephen Sieh, the company's Managing Partner hailed the move as a "profound step forward" for the firm. Adding that "there is no better industry leader and advisor more respected than (Tan)," whom he says "epitomizes the values of achievement, integrity and wisdom." Tan is currently one of Primiero's Managing Partners.

Tan also restores old houses. In 2011 he sold one of his projects in Forbes Park to boxing champion, Manny Pacquiao for the then record amount of Php 388 million, triggering a price surge that has sent property prices in the posh subdivision soaring to as high as Php 1 billion pesos for a "nine-bedroom, ten-bathroom, two-story South Forbes house."

== Education ==
Tan graduated from De La Salle University with a Bachelor of Science degree in commerce, Major in Accounting in June 1982. In June 1987, he received a Master of Management degree from the J.L. Kellogg Graduate School of Management, Northwestern University in Evanston, Illinois where his concentration was in Finance and Management Information Systems. He is also a certified public accountant in Pennsylvania, USA and in the Philippines.

== Current Positions ==
Tan currently serves as vice chairman of the Pan Malayan Management and Investment Corporation (PMMIC), a privately owned conglomerate that is a controlling shareholder in House of Investments, energy firm Engineering Equipment, Inc. (EEI) Corporation, PetroEnergy Resource Corporation, iPeople. RCBC, RCBC Realty Corporation, Malayan Insurance Company Inc., Sunlife Grepa Financial, Honda Cars Philippines, and Isuzu Manila, Inc. Tan serves on the boards of many of these companies.

On July 19, 2019, it was announced that Tan was appointed president and CEO of Yuchengco-owned House of Investments Inc. (HI), an investment holding and management company counted as one of the four major flagship corporations of the Yuchengco Group.

Tan currently serves as director of Smart Communications, Inc., EEI, Sunlife Grepalife, Malayan Insurance, House of Investments, and De La Salle Zobel, He is also on the board of adviser of Roberto Ongpin's Alphaland Development Corporation.

He is a managing partner and co-founder of leading Manila-based advisory firm Primeiro Partners. In January 2018, he was elected as Director of the Yuchengco Group's, iPeople, Inc., owner and operator of the Mapua Institute of Technology.

== Contributions to the Philippine and Asian Banking Industry ==
Tan was the president of the Bankers Association of the Philippines (BAP) from 2013 to 2016, and represented the BAP in the ASEAN Bankers Association (ABA), composed of the national banking associations from the 10-member countries in the Association of Southeast Asian Nations (ASEAN).

He was one of the longest serving BAP presidents steering the banking industry through regulatory reforms. He led the merger of two twenty-year-old ATM networks, Megalink and Bancnet. He also spearheaded the merger of the Philippine Stock Exchange (PSE) and the Philippine Dealing Exchange (PDEX), the Philippines' bond and foreign exchange platform.

From 2012 to 2014, Tan also led as chairman of the Asian Bankers Association, a banking association of 103 banks from 26 Asian countries. Tan encouraged the association's members to offer innovative products that help the movement of debt and equity from markets with excess funds to markets with demand for development such as infrastructure, manufacturing equipment, or other long term needs.

In 2013 he was the keynote speaker at the 13th Annual Pacific Region Investment Conference, which is hosted by the Asia Pacific Association for Fiduciary Studies (APAFS), "a Guam based non-profit educational and charitable association whose goal is to raise the level of understanding and standards of practice among fiduciaries in the region by providing educational programs and opportunities, so that they may provide the most prudent stewardship of the funds entrusted to their care. " He also keynoted the 2016 Philippine Business and Investment Forum in New York, where he talked about how "new foreign banks add capacity" to the Philippine economy.

== Professional life ==
=== Early career ===
Lorenzo Tan has had extensive experience in banking both in the Philippines and abroad. This includes various positions in Citibank N.A. and Citibank Singapore from 1987 to 1995, where he served as Director of Regional Financial Advisory of Citibank Singapore (1993 to 1995), Vice President of Global Finance of Citibank Los Angeles, USA (1991 to 1993) and Assistant Vice President of Citicorp Real Estate of Citibank, New York (1987 to 1991). In addition, Mr. Tan has served in 37 Boards of four different organizations across five different industries.

Tan was also the former president and COO of United Coconut Planters Bank, and the vice chairman and director of UCPB Savings Bank and UCPB Rural Bank. He was the director/president of Minola Corporation, and of HLG Capital Philippines and HLG Assets Management (Philippines), Inc. he was also a director of the National Food Authority, Philippine International Trading Corporation, Island Country Telecommunications, Inc., Orion Land, Inc., Tutuban Properties, Inc., Dao Heng Bank, Pepsi Cola Products Phils., Inc., First Lepanto Taisho Insurance and Bradstock Aurora Insurance Brokers.

=== Rizal Commercial Banking Corporation ===
Lorenzo Tan was president and chief executive officer of RCBC for 9 years, from 2007 to 2016. During his first year with RCBC he steered the bank to a 56% growth in its net income at Php 3.21 billion, the steepest profit growth among the Philippines' top 10 banks. In 2009 RCBC recorded a 54% increase in its net income at Php3.33 billion. This was followed by net incomes of Php4.28 billion in 2010, Php5.9 billion in 2011, and peaking at Php5.94 billion in 2012.

It was also during his tenure as president that the bank was able to secure several equity and debt capital raisings, including Cathay Life Insurance Co. Ltd of Taiwan (Php8 billion in 2015), CVC Capital Partners (US$115 million in 2012), and the International Finance Corporation led US$320 million bond issue, which in 2015 was "the largest dollar-denominated bond issuance by a Philippine bank.

Tan also initiated the acquisition of 49% of Grepalife by Sunlife Financial Philippines, creating Sunlife-Grepa Financial, the third largest bancassurance partnership in the Philippines.

RCBC was also the recipient of numerous banking awards and recognitions during Tan's turn at the helm of the bank. This includes being named by Asiamoney Magazine as "Best Domestic Private Bank" and the "Overall Best Private Bank in the Philippines" for four straight years. Asiamoney also recognized RCBC for being the "Best Domestic Provider for Overall FX Services in the Philippines" and "Best Domestic Provider for FX Options in the Philippines." In 2016, the magazine again named RCBC as "Overall Best Private Bank" in its annual poll. RCBC was also named as the Philippine bank with the “Best Implementation of a Technology Solution” at the Wealth Briefings Asia Awards 2015 in Singapore for the successful rollout of its new Finacle Wealth Management System.

During his term as president and CEO OF RCBC, Tan also served as Executive Vice Chairman of RCBC, Vice-chairman of RCBC Savings Bank, Director of Rizal Commercial Banking Corp., and a Director of RCBC Capital Corporation.

==== Bangladesh Bank Heist Controversy ====
In February 2016, RCBC became involved in the Bangladesh bank heist when one of the bank's branches was used by still unidentified hackers to transfer US$81 million, of the total US$951million that was initially stolen from the Bangladesh Central Bank.

In the wake of the incident, Tan went on voluntary leave in order to give the bank a free hand in its investigation. But even after being cleared by the bank's independent investigation, Tan still chose to resign as head of RCBC on May 6, 2016, to take "full moral responsibility" for the incident. He was also subsequently cleared by all other investigating government agencies.

Tan filed civil and criminal cases against the former RCBC bank manager at the center of the controversy for libel and perjury after she dragged his name into the case. The manager admitted to lying in her statements given to the committee conducting an investigation in the Philippine Senate. On January 10, 2019, Deguito was found guilty of money laundering in connection with the $81-million cyber heist on Bangladesh's central bank. She was sentenced to 4 to 7 years in prison for each of the 8 counts of money laundering by the Makati Regional Trial Court. She was also fined a total of $109 million.

Subsequent investigations into the hacking, which are being conducted by the Federal prosecutors in the United States, have revealed that the government of North Korea may have possibly had a role in the theft of the US$81 Million. Some or all of the stolen funds may have found its way to North Korea. The FBI is examining the totalitarian state's link to the hack, according to two officials with direct knowledge of the investigation. US National Security Agency Deputy Director Rick Ledgett was also quoted as saying that, “If that linkage from the Sony actors to the Bangladeshi bank actors is accurate — that means that a nation state is robbing banks."

The U.S. has charged a North Korean computer programmer with the 2016 cyber-heist of Bangladesh's central bank, among other celebrated global hacking attacks, alleging they were carried out on behalf of the regime in Pyongyang. The hacks also included the WannaCry 2.0 virus, the 2014 Sony Pictures attack. The hack of the central bank of Bangladesh saw at least $81 million stolen and transferred between a number of accounts in the Philippines and elsewhere, rendering most of it unrecoverable.

On March 23, 2020, the US District Court for the Southern District of New York has finally dismissed the case filed by Bangladesh Bank to RCBC and its officers. Due to its failure to state a Racketeer Influenced and Corrupt Organizations (RICO) Conspiracy act claim, the US Court has granted the defendant's joint motion for dismissal.

The controversy that dragged his reputation finally comes to a conclusion. The situation was seen as Bangladesh Bank's neglect and inefficiency has caused the situation to happen.

=== Sun Life of Canada (Philippines) ===
From 2005 to 2007, Tan was responsible for the business growth and leadership of Sun Life Financial in the Philippines. This consisted of three businesses: insurance, pre-need and mutual funds.

The insurance company was the second largest in the Philippines in 2005 with total assets in excess of Php60 billion, with a more than 2,300 strong agency force, and 53 branches and sales offices nationwide. By year-end 2006, Sun Life pre-need leapt to the number one position (from 6th), its mutual funds business overtook its main competitor, and its life insurance unit remained a strong second. That same year he was awarded the Insurance CEO (CEO EXCEL Awards) of the year by IABC/Phils.

=== Philippine National Bank ===
At 40 years old, Tan became the youngest president in the bank's history. While serving as president and CEO of the Philippine National Bank, Tan was responsible for managing the fourth largest private bank in the Philippines with 324 domestic branches and 99 overseas offices with total assets in excess of Php 200 billion.

Tan joined the PNB on April 10, 2002, upon the invitation of its two major shareholders, namely, the government-owned Philippine Deposit Insurance Corp. (PDIC) and the Lucio Tan Group. At that time, the PDIC had just infused P7.8 billion in equity, in the form of preferred shares in the bank, in line with its five-year rehabilitation program. Tan was given the "principal mandate to lead the five-year rehabilitation efforts and turn around the financial performance from losses to profits." He is credited with the adoption of the "good bank-bad bank" strategy, which resulted in the early recovery of government funds, including premium in just the third year of the five-year rehabilitation program. During his term as president of PNB, Tan was able to steer the bank to its first profitability in 6 years with Php 168 million net income in 2003 versus P2 billion projected loss, reversing Php 33 billion losses in 5 years.

=== Yuchengco Group of Companies ===
Following his extended stint as RCBC's top executive, Tan is currently the head of the Yuchengco Group of Companies' House of Investments (HI). The firm was first incorporated in 1959 as the first investment bank in the Philippines. Currently, HI's diverse portfolio is focused on car dealerships, construction, education, and project and property management. HI operates car dealerships under the Honda and Isuzu brands. HI owns Landev Corporation, which is primarily engaged in property and project management for the YGC as well as security services. The firm also owns a majority stake in the EEI Corporation, a leading Philippine construction and general contracting firm with projects across Asia, and in iPeople, owner of the Malayan Education System, Inc. which operates as Mapúa University. In January 2018, Tan was elected as Director of iPeople.

== Mr. Turnaround ==
Lorenzo Tan is known in the banking industry as "Mr. Turnaround" for his knack of improving the economic performances of the various corporations he has headed. When he was appointed president and chief executive officer of Rizal Commercial Banking Corp. (RCBC) on February 1, 2007, the institution was under capitalized and its asset quality was poor.

Just one year later, following some structural, operational and capital changes, RCBC was able to report a 56% jump in unaudited net income to P3.21 billion (US$77.2 million); the steepest profit growth among the country's top 10 banks for that year. Before taking charge at RCBC, Tan was at the helm of Sun Life of Canada (Philippines) for 18 months, during which time he took the company to higher levels in insurance, the pre-need industry and mutual funds.

Prior to that, he was able to reverse the fortunes of the formerly state-owned Philippine National Bank (PNB). One year under Tan's watch, PNB was able to go from five straight years of losses to enter the black in 2003. It then doubled net income in 2004 and was ready for privatization the following year, two years ahead of schedule.

== Awards and recognitions ==
Lorenzo V. Tan is the recipient of numerous awards and recognitions, including being named one of the Ten Outstanding Young Men (TOYM) for Banking in 1999.

He has also been consistently among the top taxpayers in the Philippines, having made the list in 2012, 2013, and 2015.

In 2014 Tan was named by Megaworld as among the Philippines Top 25 Visionaries.

In 2015 Tan was a recipient of the prestigious PeopleAsia "People of the Year" award. He was again honored by the magazine in 2016 when he was included in their "16 men who matter" in the Philippines list.

He received a La Sallian Achievement Award in 2011 from the De La Salle University, which is given to alumni who have "achieved either industrial, managerial, professional, vocational, or public service distinction or series of distinction."
