= Nestor Tan =

Nestor V. Tan
- Born: Nestor Villanueva Tan; February 26, 1958 (age 68); Manila, Philippines
- Education: De La Salle University(BS); Wharton School of the University of Pennsylvania(MBA)
- Occupations: President and CEO - (BDO Unibank, Inc.); Chairman - (De La Salle University)

Nestor Villanueva Tan is the President and CEO of BDO Unibank, Inc. (BDO), Philippines' largest bank in terms of total resources, loans, deposits and assets under management as of the end of 2015.

Tan was born on February 26, 1958. He is the eldest son of Atty. Rufino Reyes Tan and Erlinda Angeles Villanueva. He is the brother of former Banker's Association of the Philippines (BAP) president, Lorenzo V. Tan and Raul Tan, vice president for engineering of Therma-Wave, Inc. in Fremont, California.

Concurrently, he holds vice chairmanships and/or directorships in the following subsidiaries of BDO Unibank, namely, BDO Capital & Investment Corporation, BDO Insurance Brokers, Inc., BDO Leasing and Finance, Inc., BDO Private Bank, Inc. and BDO Remit (USA), Inc. He is also a director in Generali Pilipinas Life Assurance Company, Inc., Generali Pilipinas Insurance Co., SM Keppel Land, Inc., and Asian School of Business & Technology. He was elected president of the Bankers Association of the Philippines in March 2016. He also holds directorships in the Advisory Board of Mastercard Worldwide. At the same time, he holds chairmanships in BDO Strategic Holdings, Inc. and BancNet Inc. and a trustee of BDO Foundation, Inc., Pinoy Me Foundation, De La Salle University Board of Advisors, Asian Institute of Management and Philippine Business for Education. He was the chair of MegaLink prior to its Bangko Sentral ng Pilipinas-mandated merger with BancNet.

Tan previously worked with the Mellon Bank (now Bank of New York-Mellon) in Pittsburgh, Pennsylvania; the Bankers Trust Company (now Deutsche Bank) in New York City; and the Barclays Group in New York and London. Prior to joining BDO Unibank, he was chief operating officer for the Financial Institutions Services Group of BZW, the investment banking arm of the Barclays Group.

== Education ==
Tan graduated from De La Salle University with a Bachelor's Degree in Commerce and obtained his Masters in Business Administration from the Wharton School, University of Pennsylvania.

== Awards and recognition ==
In 2015, Tan won the Best Executive in the Philippines award from Asiamoney. Other citations received include Asia's Best CEO Award from Corporate Governance Asia, CEO Excel Award from the International Association of Business Communicators (IABC) and the KPMG Executive Leadership Team of the Year from Asia CEO Awards.
