= Marcian James =

Irish educator (1868–1938)

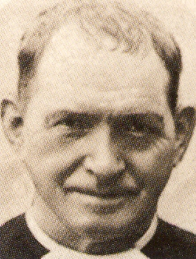
James as the Director of St Joseph's College.

Brother Marcian James (30 August 1868 – 2 September 1938), also known as James Marcian and Marcian James Cullen, was an Irish educator and Catholic missionary who served as the Brother Director of St. Xavier's Institution in Penang from 1912 to 1915 and again in 1917, of St Joseph's College in Hong Kong from 1921 to 1922, of St. Joseph's Institution in Singapore from 1922 to 1927, of De La Salle College in Manila from 1933 to 1936, and of St. Michael's Institution in Ipoh in 1938. He wrote the lyrics to the school songs for several Lasallian institutions, including four of the five aforementioned.

== Early life and education ==
James was born on 30 August 1868 in the village of Emo in what was then Queen's County, Ireland. He was the son of James Cullen. He joined the De La Salle Christian Brothers in his youth, receiving his education in Ireland and France.

== Career ==
James was first posted to the De La Salle Teachers Training College in Waterford as the Assistant Master. In 1903, he was posted to the Far East, serving in Colombo and Penang. He held the positions "with great distinction". By February, he was teaching at the St. Xavier's Institution in Penang. In 1912, he was appointed the institution's Brother Director, succeeding Brother Marius James Byrne. On 30 September 1914, he left for Kuala Lumpur to act as the Brother Director of St. John's Institution in Kuala Lumpur, taking the place of Brother James Gilbert who was on sick leave. He stepped down from this position in 1915. By August 1916, he was the president of the Selangor Catholic Club's Literary Association. He again served as the headmaster of St. Xavier's Institution for a brief period around August 1917. As headmaster, he was regarded as a "zealous worker and an experienced educationalist." In the late 1910s, he was the Director of the St. Joseph's Novitiate in Pulau Tikus, Penang. In September 1919, he stepped down from the novitiate and left for Europe as he had been in "indifferent health".

James was then posted to Hong Kong to serve as the Brother Director of the St Joseph's College (SJC), a post he assumed on 16 January 1921. He took over from Brother Aimar Pierre Sauron, who had gone on leave. Under his leadership, the school performed well academically and in athletics, winning the local Schools Football League. According to the Hong Kong Daily Press, his tenure was considered successful, and with his "great kindness he easily won the esteem and respect of all his pupils and the old boys of the College." He was reportedly "widely esteemed for his piety." James oversaw the relocation of SJC to its new premises on Kennedy Road, opened by Governor Sir Edward Stubbs. He had moved the school prior to that campus's completion to allow for the Wah Yan English School, which was in desperate need of a larger premises, to move into SJC's old premises. He stepped down from the post on 1 February 1922 as he was to be transferred to the St. Joseph's Institution (SJI) in Singapore. He was succeeded at St. Joseph's College by Brother Michael Noctor, formerly of SJI.

Arriving in Singapore in mid-February, James began acting as the Brother Director of SJI, with the Director, Brother Aimar, having left for France on leave due to failing health, However, the latter would not ultimately return to the post and James officially assumed the position instead. As headmaster, he revived an old Lasallian practice which required each class standing up every half an hour. The hall monitor would say: "Remember that we are in the Holy Presence of God." The rest of the class would respond with a "Hail Mary". The practice was again discontinued in the 1950s, though it continued to "[survive] tenuously". He founded the school's cadet corps. Under his tenure, the school performed well in athletics.

In October 1922, James was elected to the committee of the Singapore and South Malaya Boy Scouts Association. According to The Straits Budget, he "did much to encourage the Boy Scout movement" in Singapore. He was elected the vice-chairman of the Singapore Teachers' Association, headed by D. A. Bishop of Raffles Institution, in November 1925. In May 1927, James announced that he would be retiring from the post. A farewell was held on 4 May, shortly before his departure. He was succeeded at SJI by Stephen Buckley, who had previously served as the school's director. Sometime in this period, he returned to Queen's County, Ireland to teach at the Novitiate in Castletown. He also returned to Hong Kong to revive the St. Joseph's College Association. In 1931, James acted as the Director of the St. Paul's Institution in Seremban in place of Brother Barnitus Kennedy, who had been admitted to the Singapore General Hospital. After this, he returned to directing the Pulau Tikus Novitiate before leaving for Manila in 1933 to assume the post of President at De La Salle College, where he remained until 1936.

In January 1938, James arrived in Ipoh and assumed the position of Brother Director at the St. Michael's Institution, succeeding Brother Finan Ryan. As Director, he founded the Confraternity of the Infant Jesus and secured the future expansion of the school's enrollment from the local Education Department. He also initiated dual sessions at the school. He was reportedly "much loved by pupils who crowded around him especially during the times when he was in hospital." His term as Director was cut short by his death five months into the role.

At St. Joseph's College, he wrote the lyrics to the school song, which took its melody from the traditional Irish song O'Donnell Abú. He then adapted it slightly for St. Joseph's Institution, St. Michael's Institution and St. Xavier's Institution. According Brother Herman Fenton, though he never actually taught at or directed the La Salle College, also in Hong Kong and the sister school to St. Joseph's College, he also wrote the lyrics to that institution's school rally, based on a melody taken from a "French martial air" supplied by the principal Brother Brigant Cassian.

== Personal life and death ==
At the Novitiate at Pulau Tikus, James was "revered" as Novice Haster. At SJI, he was the only Brother who wore the calotte, which was historically required of Brothers. He was known to "stand in school Assembly with his hand pressed to his side as though he were in pain." In July 1931, he was "taken seriously ill", and it was believed that a trip by sea would "do him good". He then agreed to preside at the Brothers' annual retreat in Hong Kong. However, he "had relapse" on the trip there and was admitted to the St. Teresa's Hospital shortly after arriving in the city. The doctors there "held out little hope for his recovery" and he died on 2 September. The funeral was held at the St. Michael's Catholic Cemetery in Happy Valley the day after, where he was buried. Requiem masses were held at the Cathedral of the Good Shepherd in Singapore and the St Michael's Church in Ipoh.
