= Michael Noctor =

Irish-American educator (1856–1936)

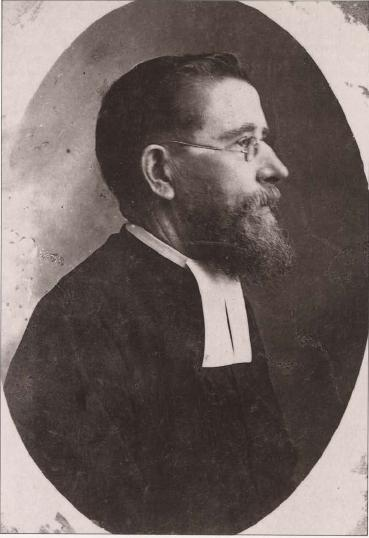
Brother Michael as Director of St. Joseph's Institution.

Edward Joseph Noctor (Note: Also referred to as Edward Joseph Naughter.) (1852 or 25 December 1856 – 9 July 1936), whose religious name was Brother Ascisclus Michael (Note: Also referred to as Acisclus Michael.) and who was best known as Brother Michael Noctor or simply Brother Michael, was an Irish-American educator, Catholic missionary and builder. He served as the headmaster of the St. Joseph's Institution in Singapore from 1900 to 1914, the De La Salle College in Manila from 1915 to 1919 and from 1923 to 1927, and the St Joseph's College in Hong Kong from 1922 to 1923. He extended the SJI premises and erected the De Le Salle College's Taft Avenue campus.

== Early life and education ==
Noctor was born on either 1852 or 25 December 1856 in the town of Kilmurray in County Wexford, Ireland, and was baptised at nearby Gorey shortly after. He was the son of Charles and Catherine Donohue Noctor. In 1874, he emigrated to New York City and enrolled in the Christian Brothers Academy of the De La Salle Brothers, taking his habit there the year after. He served as the headmaster of the elementary school at St. Gabriel's Roman Catholic Church in Riverdale, Bronx. He attained United States citizenship by the end of the century. He lived in Canada for a time.

== Career ==
=== Singapore ===
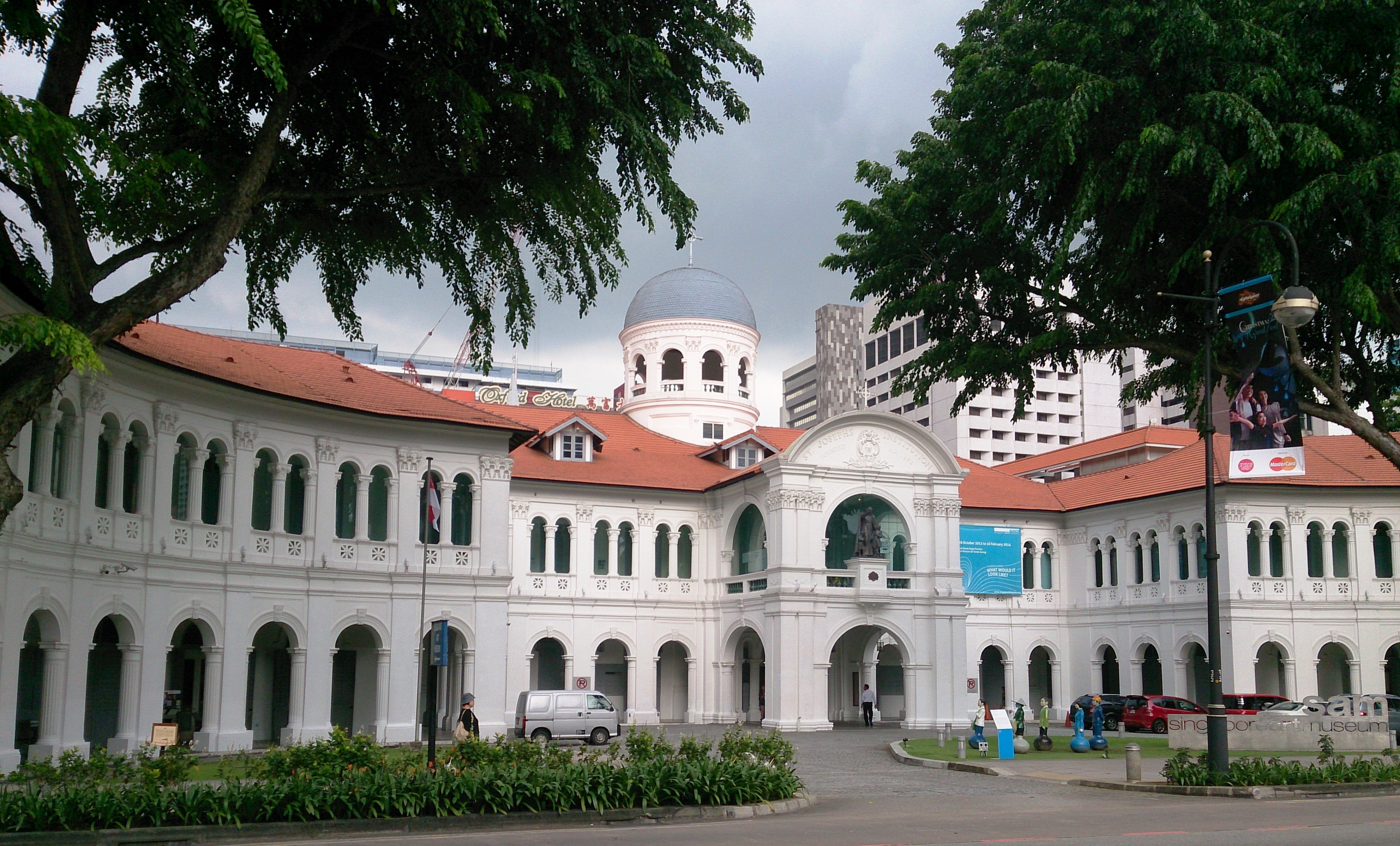
The former premises of St. Joseph's Institution in 2013.

In 1900, Noctor was told that he was to be posted to the Far East for a "short duration." He arrived in Singapore in November, succeeding Brother Gregory McGrath as the Brother Director of St. Joseph's Institution (SJI). By then, the school had already outgrown its now "old and dingy" premises on Bras Basah Road. In November 1902, he started work on an extension which was to include two curved wings with verandahs accompanied by arched openings, as well as a dome. He had initially intended on following through Brother Gregory's plans for the addition of a third storey, though architects Swan & Maclaren advised against going forward with that plan. The plans for the extension had been drawn up by Charles Bénédict Nain, a Catholic missionary who was also an architect and who had been approached by Noctor shortly after the latter had arrived on the island. The extension was completed in 1903.

However, the 1903 additions soon proved insufficient, with enrollment having grown from 426 in 1900 to 743 in 1905, and in 1906 he began raising funds for yet another extension. Named the Anderson Block after benefactor Sir John Anderson, the Governor of the Straits Settlements, it was opened in August 1907. Noctor had approached both Sir Anderson and philanthropist Tan Jiak Kim, who were persuaded to contribute significantly to the fundraising for this extension. Later that month, he left Singapore on retirement, unsure if he would return. Brother Aimar Pierre Sauron acted as Director in his place. He then went on a "tour of the world", which involved visiting former students who were studying elsewhere on scholarship and visiting schools across Europe, America, Japan and the Philippines, before returning to Singapore as headmaster of SJI by January 1909. In 1911, Noctor ordered the addition of the King George Hall and a school chapel above, which were both opened in 1912. The old school hall had been deemed a safety hazard that could "fall down at any moment." This was his "last great building enterprise" at SJI. He was able to raise $7,950 for the expansion, supplemented by $2,107 raised by students. With these, the school reportedly became "one of the largest in Singapore."

In 1913, Noctor raised funds for a chapel for the Brothers at Telok Kurau and a bungalow for Boarders, with Nain designing the latter. Francis Brown argues that this may have been why he had chosen to forego a holiday trip he had planned to embark on in that year, and that this may have "broke his health completely". In the same year, he oversaw the installation of the Statue of de La Salle, sculpted by Cesare Aureli and donated by a descendant of Jean-Baptiste de La Salle. In March 1914, it was announced that Noctor would be stepping down from SJI and leaving Singapore entirely as his health had begun to decline over the past 15 months. A farewell ceremony was held on 25 March, the day before his departure. He was succeeded as Director by Brother Stephen Buckley, who had aided Noctor throughout the latter's tenure as Director. According to archivist Jennifer Joseph, Noctor "raised educational standards even further" at the school. As Director, he heavily scrutinised the readiness of the Brothers who were sent to teach at SJI. He would "swiftly [send] home" those who "failed to survive" this and the remaining Brothers "gave years and years of devoted service." He would encourage the students, who were mostly Catholic, to go to the school chapel at the start of the day. He was known to let less fortunate boys study and lodge at the school for free.

=== Manila and Hong Kong ===
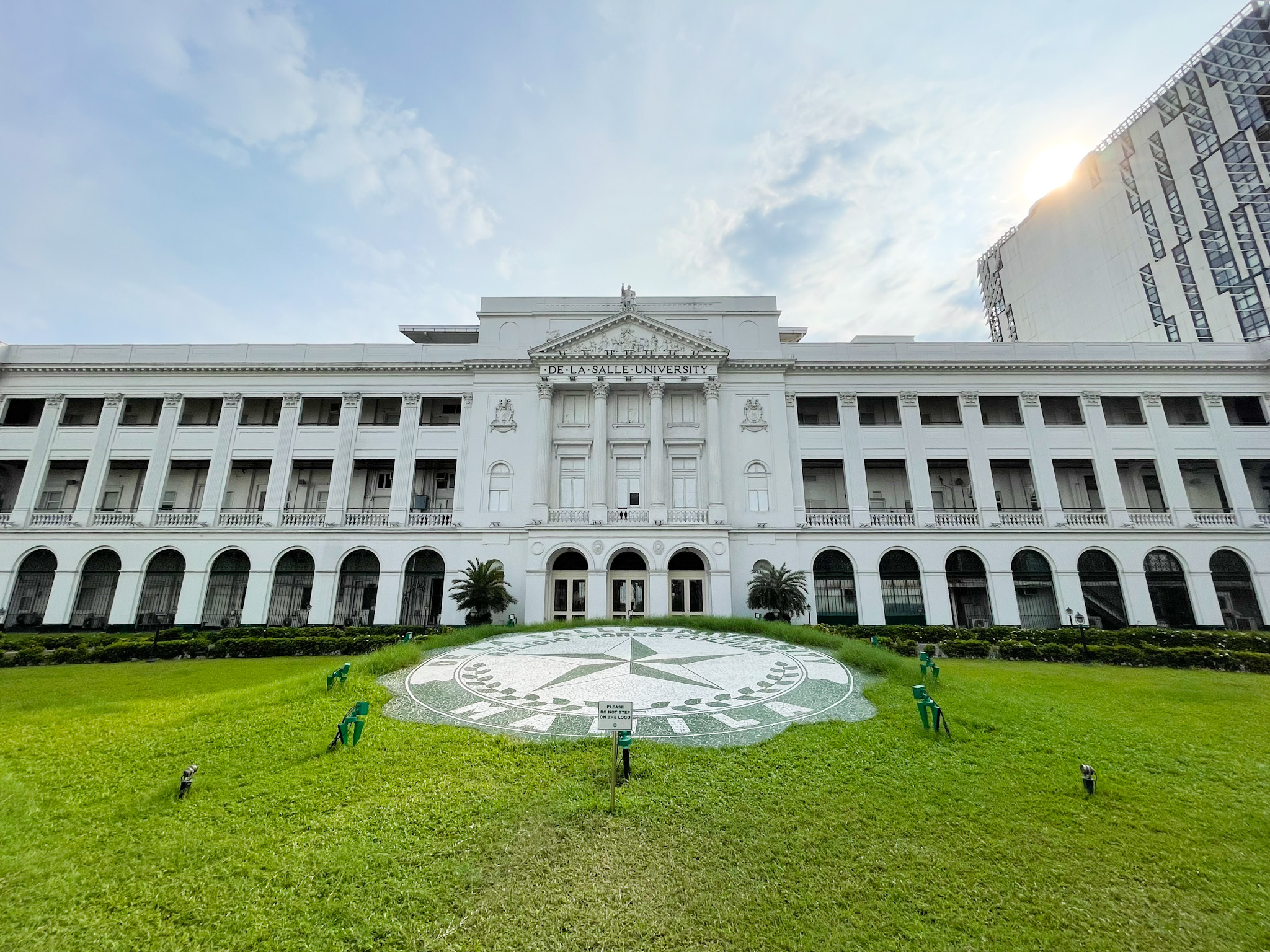
St. La Salle Hall in 2025.

After "finding his health restored", Noctor agreed to return to East Asia and was posted to Manila. He had previously studied the feasibility of establishing a Lasallian institution in the area, which led to the founding of the De La Salle College on Nozaleda Street in 1911. He assumed the position of Director there at the start of 1915 and quickly found the school's premises to be inadequate, deciding to relocate the institution to a larger site. After taking a loan from Singapore, he acquired a site on what is now Taft Avenue shortly after assuming the post and organised an architectural competition seeking a design for the college. Tomás Mapúa's design for the St. La Salle Hall was selected, though work on the campus was met with several delays due to a lack of funding. Noctor stepped down as Director in January 1919, after which he left for the United States. He was succeeded by Brother Albinus Peter Graves.

Noctor was posted to the St Joseph's College in Hong Kong in 1921, taking over from Brother Marcian James as the Director until the return of Brother Aimar in 1922. Later that year, he succeeded Brother Aimar as the school's Brother Director. The Green and White School Magazine was first published under his tenure. However, only a year after he had assumed the position, he was asked to return to Manila to again head the De La Salle College. He took over from Brother Peter, becoming the first to serve two terms as President of the college, which was then still facing "growing pains". He established the physics and chemistry laboratories, followed by the biology laboratory, set up with samples acquired from a nearby museum which shuttered while work on the laboratory was still ongoing. He stepped down as president in 1927, after which he was succeeded by Brother Celba John Lynam.

== Personal life, death and legacy ==
On resigning as President of the De La Salle College in Manila, Noctor officially retired in 1928, visiting Singapore before returning to the United States. The Straits Times described this as a "loss to the cause of education in Malaya." He spent his final years at the Christian Brothers' St. Joseph's Normal Institute in the hamlet of Barrytown, New York. The Brothers there affectionately nicknamed him "China Mike" for his time in the Far East. He died there following a "short illness" on 9 July 1936. The requiem mass was held there on 11 July, after which he was buried at St. Joseph's Cemetery. A memorial service was organised by the Christian Brothers Old Boys' Association at the Cathedral of the Good Shepherd in Singapore.

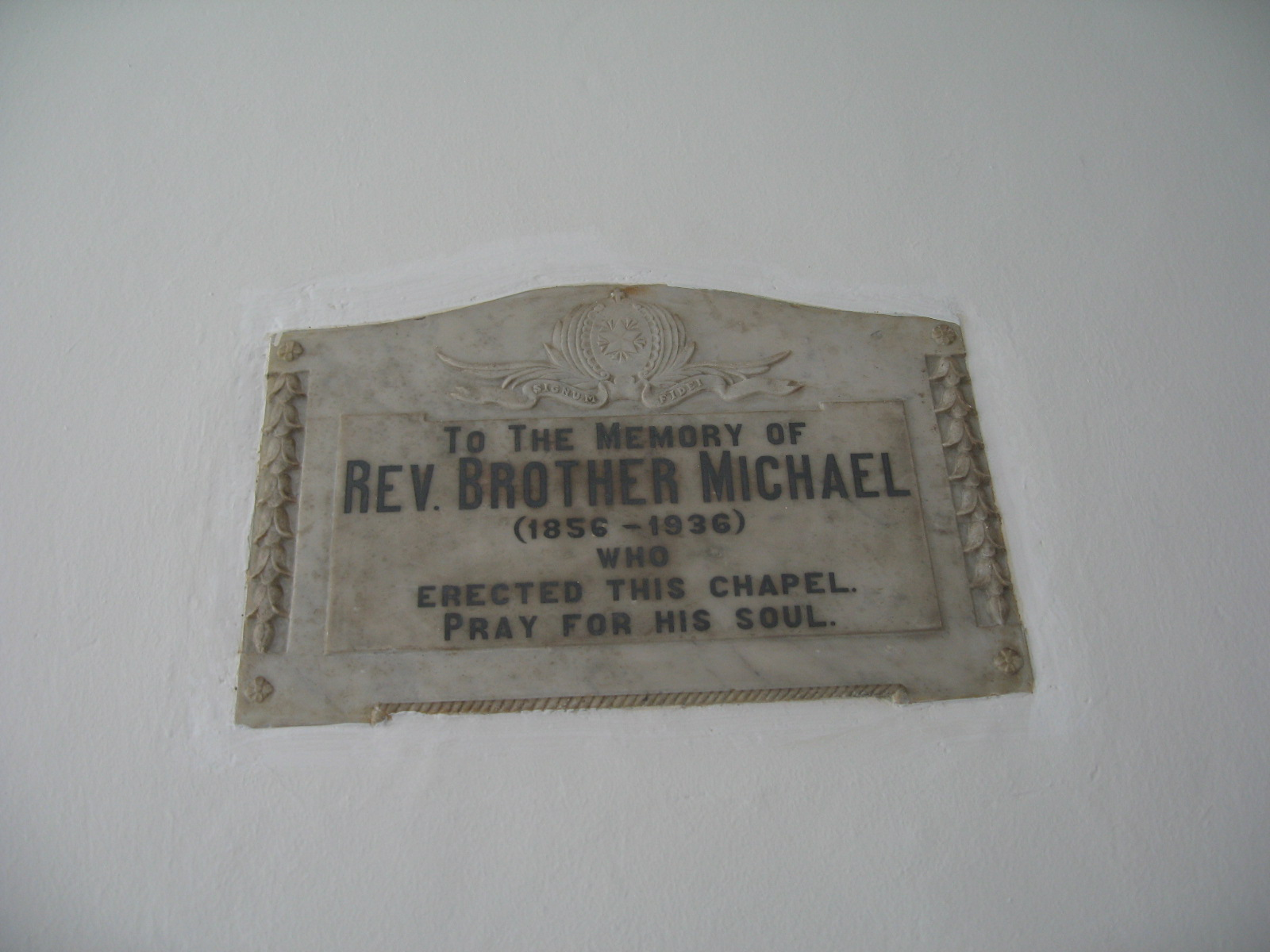
The plaque commemmorating Brother Michael at the former SJI premises.

In his obituary in The Straits Times, it was remarked that the SJI premises would "stand as a monument of his labour for the cause of education in Singapore." He was labelled "the man who built St. Joseph's". The dome and curved wings would become iconic features of the building, which has since been gazetted a National Monuments of Singapore. Students of SJI under his tenure remembered him as an "outstanding Director". In April 1937, C. J. Webb first proposed at a meeting of the committee of the Old Boys' Association that a scholarship of "not less than $3,000" for the "education of poor boys" be established in Noctor's memory. It was also proposed that a tablet be installed in the school chapel. A. J. Braga initially opposed the scholarship proposal, finding that it did not align with the association's objectives and that it was "too great an undertaking to meet with success." The committee agreed to the plan for a scholarship the month after. The scholarship was established in late 1938.

On the separation of the De La Salle primary school in Singapore from SJI, completed in 1954, the primary school was renamed St. Michael's School after Noctor, as well as St. Michael. When the plans for the school were announced, The Singapore Free Press commented that Noctor remained one of the "best-known" Directors of SJI. Frank Caulfield James, who taught at SJI under Noctor, recalled that the latter's fundraising capabilities were "something of a legend", such that it was said that "if a child swallowed a coin, Brother Michael should be the person to send for as he would be able to get it out". A small plaque commemmorating him was installed on the second floor of the Bras Basah Road premises of SJI, outside of the old school chapel. In December 1995, SJI donated two portraits to the Singapore Art Museum, then housed in the school's former premises on Bras Basah Road; one portrait was of Noctor, the other Nain. The portraits, the work of Brother Joseph McNally, were part of a series of 15 paintings depicting the prominent figures in the school's history from 1900 onwards, mostly former Directors.
