= Chang Min Tat =

Malaysian judge

Tan Sri Datuk Michael Chang Min Tat (2 April 1916 – 27 September 2007) was a Malaysian Federal Court judge, a Commissioner of Law Revision and Law Reform and chairman of the Penang State Planning Appeals Board, among other roles, and was acknowledged for his tremendous contributions to the development of the law in Malaysia.

== Education ==
From St. Michael's Institution in Ipoh, Perak he went to Raffles College in Singapore on scholarship in 1936 graduating with Diplomas in Arts and Education. Later, at Oxford he obtained his Master of Arts (Oxon) from the Honour School of English Language & Literature.

== Career ==
After Raffles, he became a teacher (at St Xavier's Branch School) but then went to Oxford - Exeter, Oxon 1950-1952 - to further his education. Once he graduated from Oxford he became a barrister and returned to practise law in Penang—his firm commenced in 1954, was at one time known as Chang and Vello. He later became a High Court judge and then a Federal Court judge. He first took oath as a Judge of the High Court of Malaya on the 25th of June 1966 before Chief Justice of Malaya, Dato Azmi bin Haji Mohamed, Justice Dato Ong Hock Thye and Justice Dato Aziz bin Mohamed Zain.

After retirement, he held various posts including:

1. Head of the Royal Commission of Inquiry to investigate the collapse of the upper deck of the Pengkalan Sultan Abdul Halim ferry terminal in Butterworth on July 31, 1988, which killed 32 people and injured 1,543 others.
2. Chairman of the Penang State Planning Appeals Board in the 1990s.
3. Commissioner of Law Revision and Law Reform (3 March 1981 - 2 April 1984).
4. Director of the public listed company Highlands & Lowlands Berhad, A Member Of The Kumpulan Guthrie Group
5. Chairman of the panel of judges for HSBC Bank Malaysia Bhd-sponsored The Penang Heritage Trust - Living Heritage Treasures of Penang Awards, 2005

== Notable court activities ==
1. Passed the death sentence on one of the country's most famous criminals, Botak Chin in 1977
2. Admitted Malaysia's first prime minister Tunku Abdul Rahman (after leaving office) to the Bar as an advocate and solicitor on July 4, 1974.

== Private life ==
He was a horse racing enthusiast and a committee member of the Selangor Turf Club. His sister is the maternal grandmother of Raja Zarith Sofiah Almarhum Sultan Idris Shah, the wife of Sultan Johor.

== An Uncommon Kindness ==
Dr. Richard Eric Holttum, third Director of Gardens, Straits Settlements (1927–1941) had this to say about him:

On one occasion, when Tan Sri Chang Min Tat heard that I would be driving from Penang to Singapore with Dr. and Mrs. Holttum, he invited us to stay with him in Kuala Lumpur and to have dinner with the Lord President and the British High Commissioner. They were meeting Dr. Holttum for the first time after hearing so much about his work. Tan Sri Justice Chang showed us further kindness by offering his larger, more comfortable car for us to proceed to Singapore.

== Books ==
1. He authored and edited the Index to The rules of the High Court, 1980, Malaysia, The rules of the Supreme Court, 1970, Singapore, with comparative tables of those rules with the English Supreme Court practice, 1979.
2. He authored Mallal's Supreme Court Practice - Vol. 1 (Second Ed.)

== Awards ==
1. He received St. Michael's institution Alumni Association's Outstanding Michaelian Award, 2006.

== Honour ==
=== Honour of Malaysia ===
- Malaysia :
  - Commander of the Order of Loyalty to the Crown of Malaysia (P.S.M.) - Tan Sri (1978)
