= Émile Barillon =

French Catholic bishop (1860–1935)

Émile Marie Luc Alphonse Barillon M.E.P.
- Bishop of Malacca-Singapore
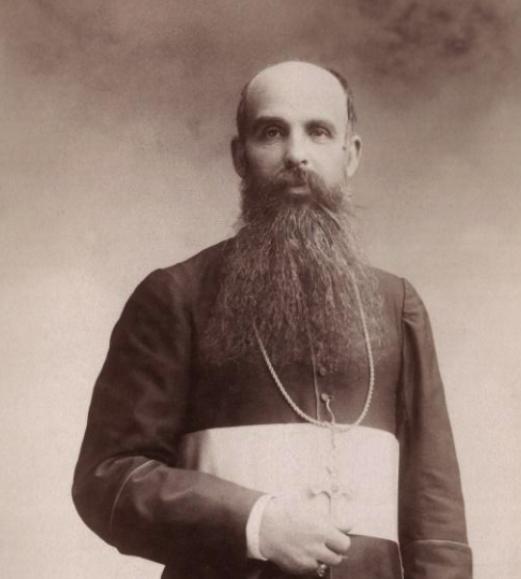
- Barillon circa 1920
- Church: Roman Catholic Church
- Diocese: Diocese of Malacca-Singapore
- Installed: 10 May 1904
- Term ended: 10 January 1933
- Predecessor: René Michel Marie Fée
- Successor: Adrien Devals

Orders
- Ordination: 20 September 1884
- Consecration: 18 September 1904 (as Bishop of Malacca-Singapore)

Personal details
- Born: 18 October 1860 Chartres, France
- Died: 27 July 1935 (aged 74)
- Buried: Singapore
- Denomination: Roman Catholic

Émile Marie Luc Alphonse Barillon MEP (18 October 1860 – 27 July 1935) was a French Catholic missionary who served as Bishop of Malacca-Singapore from 1904 to 1933.

== Early life ==
Barillon was born on 18 October 1860 in Chartres, France. He was orphaned as a child and adopted by a schoolmaster and his wife. At aged 12 he received teaching at Chartres Cathedral, and then joined the seminary at Chartres where he received minor orders. He later joined the Paris Foreign Missions Society where he was ordained as a priest on 20 September 1884.

== Career ==
Soon after his ordination in 1884, Barillon was advised of his posting to Malaya and arrived in Singapore later that year. There he learned Chinese dialects, and from 1886 to 1892 he served the Chinese communities in Singapore, Perak and in Penang where he was parish priest at the Church of the Assumption in George Town. Whilst in Penang, he acquired land in Macalister Road and built a small house and the Church of Our Lady of Seven Sorrows to cater to Chinese Catholics which he inaugurated in 1888. The following year, he went to Batu Gajah to assist Father Allard, and then went to Ipoh where he again acquired land and built St Michael's Church where he served as parish priest from 1890 to 1892.

In 1892, he was recalled to France and became professor of moral theology and director of aspirants at the Paris Foreign Missions seminary. In 1902, he was appointed Superior of the seminary at Bièvres. After the death of Bishop Fée in January 1904, Barillon succeeded him as Bishop of Malacca and Singapore, and was consecrated bishop on 18 September 1904 at the MEP chapel in Paris. He returned to Singapore and was placed at the Cathedral of the Good Shepherd where he soon began fundraising for the establishment of new churches, opening in 1910 the Church of the Sacred Heart. His intention to open a home for the aged poor was thwarted by the outbreak of the First World War when many staff returned to France. In 1925, he established the seminary of St Francis Xavier at Serangoon to address the shortage of clergy during a time of rapid increase in the size of the Catholic community in Malaya.

During the 1920's, Barillon's health was deteriorating and he was assigned coadjutor, Father Perrichan to provide assistance. In 1933, he resigned as Bishop of Malacca-Singapore as his health further worsened and was appointed titular Bishop of Thaumacus. He died on 27 July 1935 and was buried in Singapore.
