= St Michael's Church, Ipoh =

Church building in Ipoh, Malaysia

Coordinates: 4°35′42″N 101°05′18″E

St Michael's Church
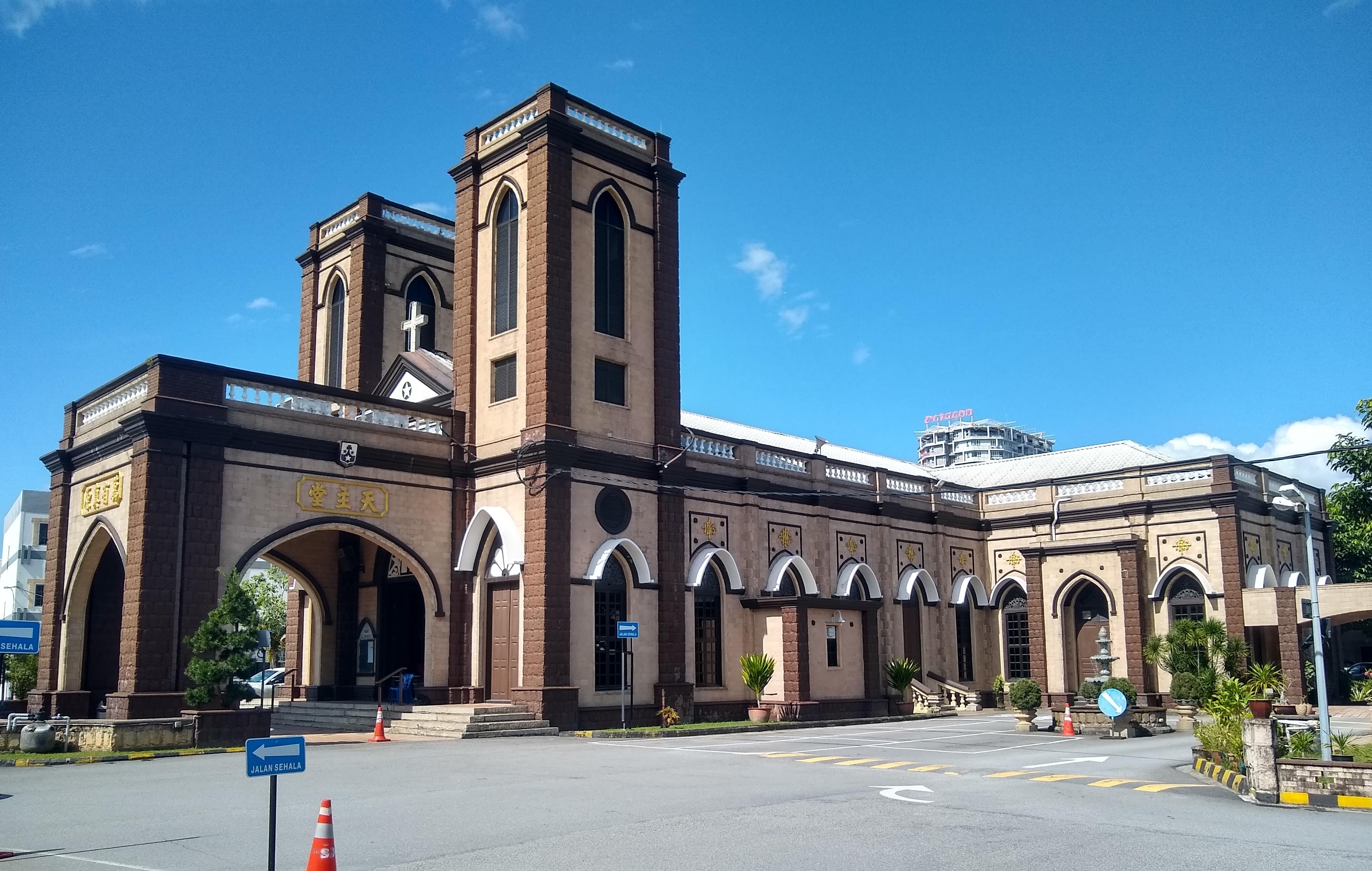
- St Michael's Church
- Address: 24 Jalan Gereja, Ipoh, Malaysia
- Denomination: Roman Catholic
- Website: https://www.smcipoh.com

History
- Status: Active
- Founded: 1890
- Founder: Émile Barillon
- Dedicated: 3 June 1896

Architecture
- Style: Gothic
- Years built: 1893-1896
- Construction cost: $14,000

Administration
- Diocese: Roman Catholic Diocese of Penang

St Michael's Church is a Roman Catholic church in Ipoh, Malaysia. Completed in 1896, it was the first Christian church to be built in Ipoh.

== History ==
St Michael's Church traces its origins back to 1890 when Émile Barilllon, a French missionary priest who was serving in nearby Batu Gajah parish and who later became Bishop of Malaya, built a modest wooden structure to serve as a place of worship for Catholics in Ipoh. Situated across the road from the church's current site in what is now the grounds of SMK Main Convent, the building served a small number of Catholics, mainly Chinese settlers who worked in the tin mining industry in the Kinta Valley.

In 1893, when Fr Pierre Perrichon succeeded Barillon as parish priest, he commissioned the construction of the current church. Built in the Gothic style, at a cost of $14,000, by a Chinese Christian contractor, Leong Ah Choong, it was completed in 1896 and formally blessed at a ceremony, attended by a Chinese congregation, on 3 June 1896.

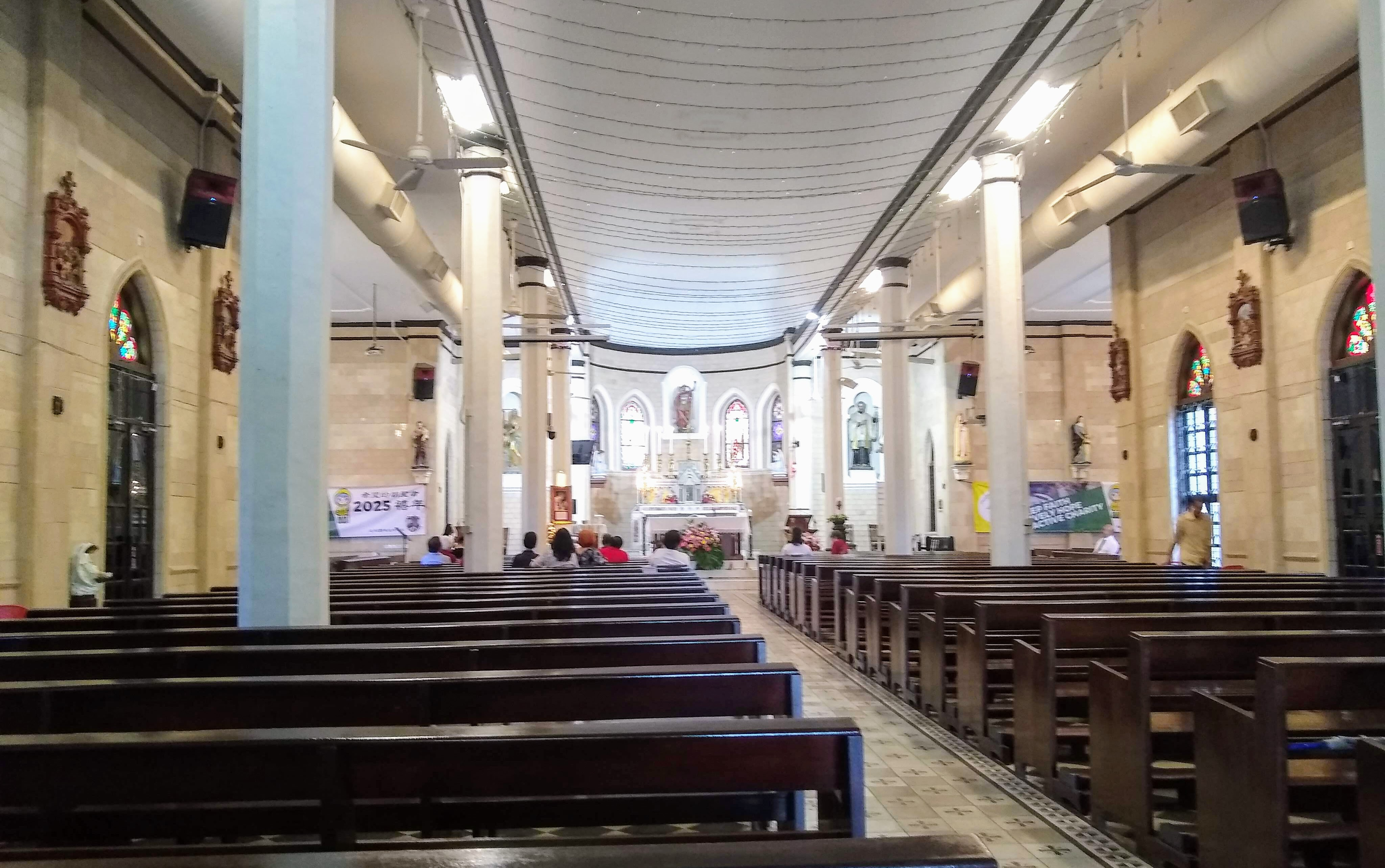
Interior of the church

Under Fr Jean Coppin, the church's longest serving parish priest (1904–1927), the parish witnessed a considerable growth in the size of the Catholic community, and Coppin was instrumental in the establishment of several Catholic institutions in Ipoh, including St Michael's Institution opened in 1926. Since the 1970s, additional buildings have been erected on the site to serve the growing community including priests' quarters, a parochial house, offices for administrative and social functions, a columbarium and a funeral parlour. In 2022, cameras and speakers were installed to enable online streaming of mass services.

In 2015, a relic of the Capuchin saint Padre Pio was received as a gift from Rome. Consisting of a small piece of cloth which is said to contain the blood of the saint, it is enshrined in a picture of the saint next to the altar.

== Description ==
Constructed in the Gothic style, the church has two towers situated on both sides of the porch of the main entrance on which is inscribed Chinese characters which state "God is the Source of all Truth".
