= Lucian Athanasius Reinhart =

De La Salle Brother

Bro. Lucian Athanasius Reinhart F.S.C.
- Born: James Hyde Reinhart; May 24, 1911; Kansas City, Missouri
- Died: May 27, 1950 (aged 39); Manila, Philippines
- Occupation: De La Salle Brother
- Title: President of De La Salle College
- Term: 1945-1950
- Successor: Andelino Manuel

Brother Lucian Athanasius Reinhart, F.S.C. was an American De La Salle Brother who was last assigned to the De La Salle Brothers in the Philippines and was a President of De La Salle College in Manila.

== Early life ==
He was born James Hyde Reinhart on May 24, 1911, in Kansas City, Missouri and entered the novitiate of the Brothers of the Christian Schools at the La Salle Institute in Glencoe, Missouri, and received the religious habit in 1926, at which time he was given the religious name Lucian Athanasius. In 1929 he was assigned to the St. George High School in Evanston, Illinois, and two years later, he would earn his Master of Arts degree from DePaul University in Chicago. In 1933, he was assigned to the De La Salle Institute, also in Chicago, and finally to the Christian Brothers College in St. Louis in 1934.

== Assignment to the Philippines ==
In the mid-1930s, brother Reinhart volunteered for mission work and was sent to the Philippines, arriving in Manila on October 30, 1936. Upon his arrival, he was assigned as Pro-Director of the Brothers' Community and concurrent principal of the college's High School Department. He was also the first American Brother in the Philippines to earn a Doctor of Philosophy Degree, after writing a dissertation on the Educational Philosophy of John Baptist de La Salle at the University of Santo Tomas.

=== World War II ===
During World War II, Reinhart was interned at Los Baños, Laguna, with the rest of the American Brothers. He would be freed by American troops in 1945 but would refuse to be returned to the United States.

=== Rehabilitation of De La Salle College ===
Reinhart stayed in the Philippines to rehabilitate De La Salle College and was appointed its president in 1945. It was also during this time that he was forced to return to the United States for health reasons. In July 1946, he returned to Manila and formed new Faculty and Brother missionaries.

He died on May 27, 1950. The gym (on which lot the Don Enrique T. Yuchengco Hall now stands) of the De La Salle College was named in his memory as well as De La Salle University's Sports Complex, now the Enrique M. Razon Sports Center.

== Notes ==
Preceded by Br. Egbert Xavier FSC	President of De La Salle College; 1945-1946	Succeeded by Bro. Antony Ferdinand Kilbourn, F.S.C.
Preceded by Br. Antony Ferdinand FSC	President of De La Salle College; 1946-1950	Succeeded by Bro. Andelino Manuel, F.S.C. Acting President (1950) 'Bro. Hyacinth Gabriel Connon, F.S.C.
