= Albinus Peter Graves =

American Christian missionary (1887–1964)

Albinus Peter Graves (born Arthur Jacob Graves; October 15, 1887 – October 11, 1964) was an American Lasallian Brother who was last posted to the De La Salle Brothers in the Philippines and was a President of De La Salle College in Manila.

== Early life ==
He was born Arthur Jacob Graves on October 15, 1887, in Minneapolis, Minnesota. During his early years, he was educated in Catholic schools and while he has expressed his desire to serve as a De La Salle Brother, his father did not allow him to do so. When he was 20 years old, he ran away from home and went to the novitiate in Pocantico Hills, New York. By the time his father knew where he was, he had already accepted his son's decision.

In 1907, Brother Graves received the religious habit and was given the religious name of Albinus Peter.

== Early assignments ==
In the immediate years after Graves' reception of the habit, Br. Peter was posted in Connecticut and New York. In 1909 he was posted at the Christian Brothers school in Hartford, Connecticut, and in 1911 he was assigned to St. John's Academy in Utica, New York. In 1913 he was then posted to St. James's Academy in Brooklyn.

== Assignment to the Philippines ==
In 1918 Brother Peter volunteered for the Christian Brothers' overseas mission to the Philippines, and in January 1919 he arrived in Manila. He was 32 years old and was named Director of De La Salle College. In his first year of Directorship, he oversaw the construction of the new site of the College on Taft Avenue. Thus, in 1921, he transferred the school from Calle Nozaleda in Paco to Taft Avenue. It was also during this time that the title of President was used for the chief executive officer of the College.

Graves negotiated the sale of the Paco lot, which was bought from the Perez-Samanillo family, to Vicente Madrigal with the agreement that the sale included the wrought iron gate of the compound. Br. Peter insisted that the gate cost extra and threatened to have it dismantled and brought to Taft Avenue if Madrigal did not pay extra for it. The gate now stands at Fort Santiago in Intramuros. Br. Peter also donated the marble altar of the new College's chapel, which he financed from the inheritance that he received.

== Assignment to Malaya ==
After his term as President, Graves was assigned to Singapore for rest; he was then assigned as Director of the Saint George School in Malaya, and then Director of the school at Mandalay in Burma. After a year, he was reassigned to Penang in British Malaya and was reappointed Director in 1925. In 1927 he was reassigned to Manila to teach Mathematics in the high school department and then back again to Penang as Sub-Director of the Junior novitiate.

== Return to the Philippines ==
Br. Peter was reassigned to Manila in 1930 for good. During World War II, he was interned by the Japanese Imperial Forces at the Internment Camp at Los Baños together with other Allied Brothers and Religious. He was rescued by American forces in 1945 and went on an eight-month vacation. On December 16, 1945, Br. Peter returned to Manila to re-establish the College.

In 1951, the De La Salle Brothers in the Philippines opened a novitiate and Graves was appointed Sub-Director and taught Theology and Church History, among other subjects.

== Death ==
On November 23, 1968, Graves was brought to the Manila Medical Center after complaining of chest pains and died four days later.

| Preceded by Br. Acisclus Michael FSC | Director/President of De La Salle College; 1919-1923 | Succeeded by Br. Acisclus Michael FSC |
