= Antony Ferdinand Kilbourn =

Member of the De La Salle religious community

Brother Antony Ferdinand Kilbourn F.S.C.
- Born: George Henry Kilbourn; June 24, 1894; Brooklyn, New York
- Died: May 3, 1961 (aged 66); Manila, Philippines
- Occupation: De La Salle Brother

Brother Antony Ferdinand Kilbourn FSC was an American De La Salle Brother who was last assigned to the De La Salle Brothers in the Philippines and was Acting President of the De La Salle College in Manila while Brother Lucian Athanasius Reinhart, F.S.C., was on leave.

== Early life ==
Kilbourn was born on June 24, 1894, in Brooklyn, New York, as George Henry Kilbourn. On March 19, 1909, he joined St. Joseph's Normal School in Pocantico Hills and received the religious habit of the Brothers of the Christian Schools on April 24, 1910, at which time he was given the religious name Antony Ferdinand.

== Assignment to the Philippines ==
At the age of 20, Kilbourn volunteered for missionary work and arrived in the Philippines in 1921, the youngest Brother in Manila. In 1924, he made his final vows and consecrated himself to the Infant Jesus.

During schoolyear 1934–1935, Kilbourn was named head of the College of Commerce. He also introduced the Palmer Method of penmanship and was one of the organizers of the Boy Scouts of the Philippines, serving on its executive board with General Carlos P. Romulo, Secretary Jorge B. Vargas and General Vicente Lim.

During World War II, Kilbourn was interned by the Japanese, along with the other American Brothers and Religious. After the War, he was named Acting President of the college after Br. Lucian Athanasius was forced to return to the United States to rest.

Kilbourn died in Manila on the evening of May 3, 1961.

== Notes ==
Preceded by Bro. Lucian Athanasius Reinhart, F.S.C.	President of De La Salle College; In an Acting capacity 1945-1946	Succeeded by Bro. Lucian Athanasius Reinhart, F.S.C.
