= Cheryl Fuerte =

Filipino web designer

- Education: De La Salle University (BS)

Cheryl Fuerte, also known as Pinay-Internaut Inday, is a Filipino web designer. She was a Filipino pioneer in blogging before the term became popular in the Philippines, having created Indayworks.com as a personal website in 1999, which became one of the most-awarded personal websites in Philippine Internet history.

She is also the web designer behind the multi-awarded DonnaCruz.com, the official website of Philippine singer-actress Donna Cruz, which has received three Philippine Web Awards, twice defeating the Philippine TV broadcasting channel giant ABS-CBN under the entertainment category.

Since late 2004, she has lived in Hong Kong where she works for Asian Entertainment e-commerce website YesAsia.

== Web design ==
While studying computer science at the De La Salle University College of Computer Studies in Manila in 1996, Fuerte started making websites, first her personal website and then a fan-based website for her favorite singer Donna Cruz as testing grounds for her university assignments. The websites were made well, and started getting many visits. Soon the fan-based website for Cruz became the official website of the singer-actress, for which it received multiple national web awards.

Being a repeat winner in the Philippine Web Awards, and having won multiple national web awards defeating companies and corporate website entries at such a young age of 21, influencing up and coming Filipino web designers, Fuerte was featured and interviewed by various publications and media in the Philippines. She was interviewed in Studio 23's Digital Tour and talked about "how Filipinos, regardless of their status, can utilize the Internet to share their knowledge and establish oneself". She was featured at Studio 23's morning show, Breakfast, in December 2000. She was also featured in The Web Philippines Magazine's feature, "Top Ten Web Artists To Watch Out For", the Manila Times' article "Webmasters of the Universe", Chalk Magazine FemaleNetwork.com, JobStreet.com, and Cosmopolitan Philippines, among many others.

She gave back to the young web designers community by being an original co-founding member of PhilWeavers from 1999 to 2003, the biggest and oldest web design organization in the Philippines, along with other Filipino artists such as Gerry Alanguilan, Cynthia Bauzon-Arre, Jose Illenberger, and Drew Europeo.

== Awards ==
- Indayworks.com - People's Choice Award at the 2nd Philippine Web Awards in 1999
- LuvKoSiInday.com (previously Indayworks.com) - People's Choice Award at the 3rd Philippine Web Awards in 2000
- Inday.heyey.com (previously Indayworks.com) - People's Choice Award at the 5th Philippine Web Awards in 2002
- DonnaCruz.com - People's Choice Award at the 1st Philippine Web Awards in 1998
- DonnaCruz.com - Best Website Award at the 2nd Philippine Web Awards in 1999
- DonnaCruz.com - Best Website Award at the 4th Philippine Web Awards in 2001
- Nonijuice.com.ph - People's Choice Award at the 2nd Philippine Web Awards in 1999
