= St. Michael's Institution =

- Institusi St. Michael.
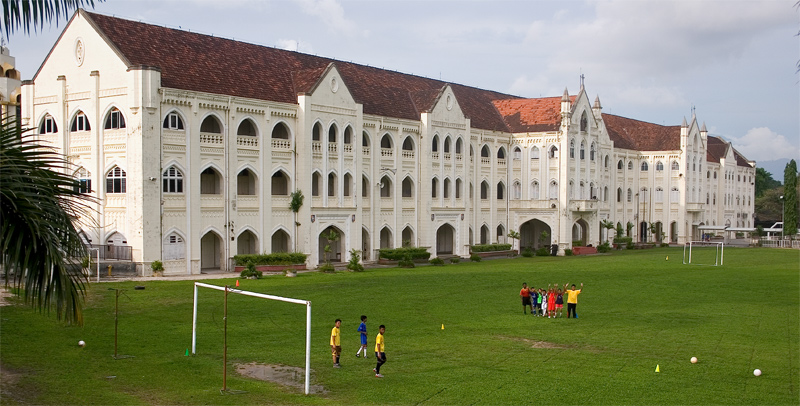
- Ipoh, Perak; Malaysia

Information
- Type: Co-educational primary and secondary school
- Motto: Latin: Quis ut Deus? (Who [is] like God?)
- Religious affiliation: Christian
- Denomination: Roman Catholic Church
- Established: 1912
- School district: Kinta
- Session: Double Session
- Principal: Lee Ah Peow
- Grades: Standard 1 - 6 Form 1 - 6
- Gender: Co-educational (since 2020)
- Enrollment: 2025: Over 1397
- Colours: Green, Gold & White
- Feeder schools: SK St. Michael, Ipoh; SK La Salle, Ipoh
- Website: stmichaelipoh.edu.my

Saint Michael's Institution (Malay: Institusi Saint Michael; abbreviated SMI) a school in Ipoh, Kinta District, Perak, Malaysia. It is situated on Jalan SP Seenivasagam, formerly Clayton Road. Within the same compound are two primary schools, St Michael's I and II.

St Michael's Institution is part of the La Sallian worldwide community of schools.

== List Of Brother Directors And Principals ==
St. Michael's Institution is part of the Lasallian Educational Institutions. SMI's two alumni associations (the Old Michaelians' Association and the Klang Valley SMI Alumni Association) belong to the Malaysian Federation of Lasallian Associations (MFOLSA), the umbrella organisation for all Lasallian alumni associations in Malaysia.

Brother Directors and Principals

- 1912 - 1920 : PJ Mor Singh
- 1920 - 1921 : Brother Paul Gallagher
- 1921 - 1924 : Brother V Augustus
- 1925 - 1929 : Brother Sigolin Henry
- 1926 : Brother V Joseph
- 1930 - 1935 : Brother Dositheus
- 1936 - 1938 : Brother Finan Ryan
- 1938 : Brother Marcian Cullen
- 1938 - 1948 : Brother Patrick O Donovan
- 1948 - 1955 : Brother Denis Hyland
- 1955 - 1960 : Brother Pius Kelly
- 1961 - 1971 : Brother Ultan Paul Rosario
- 1972 - 1975 : Brother Vincent J Corkery
- 1975 - 1985 : Brother Ultan Paul Rosario
- 1986 - 1988 : Brother Vincent J Corkery
- 1989 - 1991 : Chong Suan Ee
- 1992 - 1994 : K. Balasubramaniam
- 1995 - 1998 : Teh Chor Aun
- 1999 - 2005 : Louis Rozario Doss
- 2006 - 2011 : Phoon Chong Chee
- 2011 - 2015 : Loh Wei Seng
- 2015 - 2017 : Chan Nyook Ying
- 2017 - 2018: Gunalan Tony
- 2018 - 2022 : Sit Wai Yin
- 2022 - 2024 : Phoon Kean Loon
- 2026 - Current : Lee Ah Peow

== Notable alumni ==
- Lee Loy Seng, founder of KLK Bhd
- Michael Chang Min Tat, Federal Court judge and Commissioner of Law Revision and Law Reform
- Lim Keng Yaik, former president of the Gerakan Party and Minister of Energy, Water and Communications
- Paul Leong Khee Seong, former Minister of Primary Industries and former Deputy President of the Gerakan Party
- Ahmad Husni Hanadzlah, former Second Minister of Finance of Malaysia
- John Thivy, 1st President of Malaysian Indian Congress (MIC)
- Leong Yew Koh, first Governor (Yang di-Pertua Negeri) of Malacca
- Lee Lam Thye, former politician and national activist
- Gregory Yong Sooi Ngean, Catholic Archbishop Emeritus of Singapore
- Yeoh Ghim Seng, former speaker of the Parliament of Singapore, former vice-president of Singapore and acting president of Singapore
- Tan Yee Khan, All England badminton doubles champion 1965 and 1966
- Koo Kien Keat, Badminton Doubles World Championship Silver Medallist 2010
- Peter Pek, first publisher of Superbrands Malaysia, host of reality television series The Firm, and host of Brand Malaysia with Peter Pek
- Yeoh Eng-kiong, Secretary for Health, Welfare and Food of Hong Kong
- Patrick Teoh, DJ and actor in Malaysia and Singapore
- Ng Boon Bee, Badminton Doubles All England, Asian Games and Thomas Cup 1970
