= Asiamoney =

Magazine

- Editor: Rashmi Kumar
- Categories: Business and management magazines
- Frequency: Quarterly (print), daily (online)
- Publisher: Euromoney Institutional Investor
- Founded: 1989
- Country: United Kingdom
- Language: English
- Website: http://www.asiamoney.com/
- ISSN: 0958-9309

Asiamoney, a financial publication established in 1989, has now merged with other key capital markets publications from the Euromoney Institutional Investor Group: Euroweek, Total Securitization and Derivatives Week, to form GlobalCapital. GlobalCapital delivers daily services dedicated to the following key market sectors: FIG/bank finance including covered bonds, corporate bonds, syndicated loans, equity, leveraged finance, global emerging markets, securitization and offshore RMB.

Asiamoney is a division of global media group Euromoney Institutional Investor PLC, itself majority owned by the London-based Daily Mail and General Trust Group.

Asiamoney reports, and offers analysis on, the financial and investment markets for capital issuers, borrowers, institutional investors and senior corporate and government monetary decision makers with business interests in Asia Pacific. It is a monthly publication with daily news and analysis on the GlobalCapital website.

Asiamoney also publishes institutional rankings, including the Broker's Poll (now in its 23rd year), FX Poll, Cash Management Poll, Corporate Governance Poll and Private Banking Poll, under the Asiamoney Research banner. It launched a Fixed Income Poll in 2011 and its inaugural Offshore RMB Survey in 2012.

All of this coverage has been incorporated into the new publication, GlobalCapital.

== History ==
Asiamoney merged with Asian Finance (ISSN 1010-4143) in 1991 to form Asia Money & Finance. Asian Finance was established in July 1975.

The April 1993 edition sported the new name asiamoney with "& FINANCE" in small print underneath. In the next edition, June 1993, the small print was removed.

Graham Field was the editor. Subsequent editors have included Sarah Sargeant, Will Goodhart, Chris Wright, Pauline Loong, Chris Cockerill, Richard Morrow, and Clive Horwood.

== Asiamoney polls and awards ==
Asiamoney features several polls and awards for companies in the financial services. The awards are given in categories like Best Bank, Asia Private Banking, Middle east best banking, Best Securities House, New Silk road finance, and a special category for China awards. The polls include Asiamoney Outstanding companies, Brokers and Global RMB polls. Further it also runs surveys on Leaders for women, cash management, trade finance and Forex.
