= List of SVD schools =

This is a list of schools run by the Society of the Divine Word.

== Americas ==
=== List of schools run by the Society of the Divine Word (SVD) in Argentina ===
- Colegio Guadalupe in Buenos Aires
- Instituto Verbo Divino in Pilar
- Instituto José Manuel Estrada in Rafael Calzada
- Instituto Superior Verbo Divino in Posadas, Misiones

=== List of schools run by the Society of the Divine Word (SVD) in Brazil ===
- Colégio Arnaldo Anchieta in Belo Horizonte-MG, Brazil
- Colégio Arnaldo Funcionários in Belo Horizonte-MG, Brazil
- Colégio Cristo Redentor - Academia de Comércio in Juiz de Fora-MG, Brazil
- Colégio Verbo Divino in Barra Mansa-RJ, Brazil
- Faculdade Arnaldo College in Belo Horizonte-MG, Brazil
- Centro de Ensino Superior - JF College in Juiz de Fora-MG, Brazil

=== List of schools run by the Society of the Divine Word (SVD) in Chile ===
- Colegio del Verbo Divino (The Divine Word School) in Santiago, Chile
- Liceo Alemán del Verbo Divino (The Divine Word School) in Los Ángeles, Chile

=== List of schools run by the Society of the Divine Word (SVD) in the United States ===
- Divine Word College – Epworth, Iowa

== Asia ==
=== List of schools run by the Society of the Divine Word (SVD) in China and Taiwan ===
- Fu Jen Catholic University in Taiwan
- Sing Yin Secondary School in Hong Kong

=== List of schools run by the Society of the Divine Word (SVD) in India ===
- St. Arnold's School, Bagdehi
- St. Arnold's School, Bhubaneswar
- St. Arnold's School, Rourkela
- St. Arnold's Central school, Wadgaonsheri, Pune
- St. Arnold's Matriculation School, Trichy
- St. Arnold's High school, Medak, Telangana
- St. Arnold's High School, Ramachandrapuram
- St. Arnold's High School, Toopran
- St. Arnold's High School and Junior college [Andheri], [Mumbai]
- St. Claire High School, Ramagundam, Telangana
- St. Joseph's High School, Patancheru
- St. Lawrence School, Angul, Odisha
- St. Mary's PSM High School, Sadasivpet
- St. Mary's High School, Zaheerabad
- St. Paul's School, Rourkela
- St. Theresa's High School, Bandra, Mumbai
- New Orissa High School, Gaibira Sundargarh, Odisha
- New Orissa Higher Secondary School, Gaibira Sundargarh, Odisha

=== List of schools run by the Society of the Divine Word (SVD) in Indonesia ===
- SVD Kindergarten in Bali
- SVD Elementary School in Bali
- SVD Secondary School in Bali
- SVD High School in Bali

=== List of schools run by the Society of the Divine Word (SVD) in Japan ===
- Nanzan University in Nagoya
- Nanzan Elementary School (Nagoya)
- Nanzan Boys Junior / Senior High School (Nagoya)
- Nanzan Girls Junior / Senior High School (Nagoya)
- Seirei Girls Junior / Senior High School (Seto) run by the Steyler sisters: (Sister Servants of the Holy Spirit)Seirei Women's Junior College, Akita Prefecture

=== List of schools run by the Society of the Divine Word (SVD) in the Philippines ===
- Divine Word College of Bangued – Bangued, Abra
- Divine Word College of Laoag – Gen. Segundo Ave., Laoag City
- Divine Word College of Urdaneta – Urdaneta, Pangasinan
- Divine Word College of Vigan – Vigan, Ilocos Sur
- Divine Word College of Legazpi – Rizal Street, Legazpi, Albay
- Divine Word College of Calapan – Calapan, Oriental Mindoro
- Divine Word College of San Jose – San Jose, Occidental Mindoro
- Divine Word Academy of Dagupan – Rizal Ext., Dagupan, Pangasinan
- Divine Word High School – Dana-ili, Abulug, Cagayan
- Divine Word High School – Sanchez-Mira, Cagayan
- Academy of St.Joseph – Claveria, Cagayan
- Divine Word Formation Center – Don Filemon Sotto Drive, Cebu City
- Divine Word Formation Center – Bayaoas, Urdaneta, Pangasinan
- Divine Word Seminary – Tagaytay City
- Divine Word Mission Seminary – 101 E. Rodriguez Sr., Blvd., Quezon City
- Divine Word School of Theology – Tagaytay City
- Divine Word University (DWU) – Tacloban City – closed in 1995; re-opened as Liceo del Verbo Divino
- Holy Name University (formerly Holy Name College; also Divine Word College of Tagbilaran) – Tagbilaran City
- University of San Carlos – Cebu City, Cebu
- Saint Jude Catholic School (Chinese School) – San Miguel, Manila
- San Carlos School of Cebu (formerly University of San Carlos - Basic Education Department) - Cebu City, Cebu
