= Divine Word College of Laoag =

Roman Catholic college in Ilocos Norte, Philippines

- Dalubhasaang Banal na Salita ng Laoag (Filipino)
- Former name: Saint William's College (1946–1964)
- Motto: Deo et Patriae (Latin)
- Motto in English: For God and Country
- Type: Private Roman Catholic non-profit coeducational basic and higher education institution
- Established: 1946
- Founders: Fr. Alphonse Mildner, SVD
- Religious affiliation: Roman Catholic (Verbites)
- Academic affiliations: DWEA; CEAP; PAASCU
- Chairman: Fr. Romeo S. Fajardo, SVD
- President: Fr. Edsel R. Demilio, SVD
- Vice-president: List: Br.Alfredo B.Corton, SVD (VP for Administration); Fr.George DeCastro, SVD (VP for Finance); Gladys Jean Q. Basilio (VP for Academic Affairs); Romana L.Bitancor (VP for Alumni Affairs)
- Principal: List: Glorietta B. Sabas, Ed.D (Principal, School of Basic Education-High School); Edna R. Cabillo, MAEd (Principal, School of Basic Education-Elementary)
- Dean: List: Libertine Gertrude Macaspac (Dean, School of Arts, Sciences & Education; Frelyn B. Ranay, Ph.D (Dean, School of Business and Accountancy); Egdonna A. Quinto, Ed.D (Dean, School of Engineering, Nursing, Architecture, and Information Technology)
- Director: Fr.Denny D.Lucas, SVD (Director, School of Basic Education); Nonita A. Billaco, MAEd (Director, Learning Resource Center)
- Administrative staff: 185
- Location: Gen. Segundo Ave., Brgy. 12 Laoag City, Ilocos Norte, Philippines; 18°12′15″N 120°36′02″E
- Campus: Urban
- Alma Mater song: PRIDE of the North
- Publication: Williamite
- Colors: Blue and gold
- Website: www.dwcl.edu.ph
- Location within Luzon Location within Philippines

The Divine Word College of Laoag is a private Catholic, basic and higher education institution run by the Philippine Northern Province of the Society of the Divine Word in Laoag, Ilocos Norte, Philippines. It was founded by Rev. Fr. Alphonse Mildner, SVD in 1946.

== History ==
February 1945, Rev. Fr. Alphonse M. Mildner, SVD, upon the advice of the Father Provincial, Rev, Fr. Herman Kondring, SVD proceeded to Laoag, Ilocos Norte to see the possibility of establishing a Catholic School. This was in response to the persistent invitation of Rev. Msgr. Ignacio Cordero the parish priest of St. William's Parish at that time. Within the few months’ stay of Fr. Alphonse Mildner, SVD, he observed the urgent need to separate and accommodate the growing number of high school male students of the then Holy Ghost Academy. Likewise, he felt the pressing necessity to accommodate graduating students who were unable to pursue college studies in Manila due to financial reasons. In view of these observations, Fr. Alphonse Mildner, SVD, immediately recommended to his superiors the establishment of a school not just a boys' high school as formerly contemplated, but also a college.

The school formally opened in July 1946. It was originally named St. William's College after the Patron of the Parish of Laoag and was changed to Divine Word College of Laoag in October 1964. This was done to identify the school as a SVD (“Society of the Divine Word) school. The SVD Fathers were naming or renaming all their schools Divine Word. This helped achieve uniformity in identity of all SVD run schools. So when the SVD priests opened schools in Vigan and Bangued, they were named the Divine Word College of Vigan and Divine Word College of Bangued. Aside from uniformity of identity, the name Divine Word was by that time perceived as a school of quality. The SVD Fathers wanted to take advantage of this image to attract more enrollees.

Three months after, the first issue of the school’s official organ, the “Guide” now the “Williamite” was published.

The SVD day of 1948 was highlighted with the grand inauguration and blessing of the imposing three storey Building with an auditorium known as Mildner Hall. The college hymn “Pride of the North” composed by Jose L. Pedro was sung for the first time during the SVD day celebration. The same year, the school seal was adopted incorporating the motto “Deo et Patrie”. Logo was created by architect Jorge Manligas Sr.

Cognizant of the increasing student population during the50's and 60's, the SVD decided to construct the new building on a sprawling eight hectare of land. This edifice was named K building in honor of Fr. Ernest Keilen, SVD.

It was in October 1964 that the school established a guidance office. The school continuously expanded its physical facilities with the construction of the Arnoldous Building, the K building Annex, a new college canteen, and conversion of the old Mildner Building into a ladies dormitory which was later turned over the Diocese of Laoag.

== See also ==
- Divine Word Academy of Dagupan – Dagupan, Pangasinan
- Divine Word College of Bangued – Bangued, Abra
- Divine Word College of Calapan – Calapan, Oriental Mindoro
- Divine Word College of Legazpi – Legazpi, Albay
- Divine Word College of San Jose – San Jose, Occidental Mindoro
- Divine Word College of Urdaneta – Urdaneta, Pangasinan
- Divine Word College of Vigan – Vigan, Ilocos Sur
- Divine Word University (DWU) – Tacloban, Leyte; closed in 1995, re-opened as Liceo del Verbo Divino
