= Divine Word College of Vigan =

Roman Catholic college in Ilocos Sur, Philippines

- Dalubhasaang Banal na Salita ng Vigan (Filipino)
- Former name: Colegio de la Immaculada Concepción (1822)
- Motto: Semper Fidelis
- Motto in English: Always Faithful
- Type: Private Roman Catholic Non-profit Coeducational Basic and Higher education institution
- Established: 1822; 204 years ago
- Founder: Society of the Divine Word
- Religious affiliation: Roman Catholic (Divine Word Missionaries)
- Academic affiliations: PAASCU; DWEA; CEAP
- President: Fr. Roberto J. Ibay, SVD
- Location: Burgos Street, Barangay I, Vigan, Ilocos Sur, Philippines; 17°34′29″N 120°23′23″E
- Campus: Urban
- Alma Mater song: DWCV Hymn
- Colors: Sky blue White
- Nickname: Divinians
- Location in Luzon Location in the Philippines

The Divine Word College of Vigan, Inc., also referred to by its acronym DWCV, is a private, Catholic, co-educational institution of higher learning run by the Philippine Northern Province of the Society of the Divine Word in Vigan, Ilocos Sur, Philippines. It was founded in 1822 by the society as the Colegio de la Inmaculada Concepción. The current president is Rev. Fr. Roberto J. Ibay, SVD.

== See also ==
- Divine Word Academy of Dagupan – Rizal Ext., Dagupan, Pangasinan
- Divine Word College of Bangued – Bangued, Abra
- Divine Word College of Calapan – Calapan, Oriental Mindoro
- Divine Word College of Laoag – Gen. Segundo Ave., Laoag, Ilocos Norte
- Divine Word College of Legazpi – Rizal Street, Legazpi, Albay
- Divine Word College of San Jose – San Jose, Occidental Mindoro
- Divine Word College of Urdaneta – Urdaneta, Pangasinan
- Divine Word University (DWU) – Tacloban, Leyte; closed in 1995, re-opened as Liceo del Verbo Divino
