= Divine Word Academy of Dagupan =

Roman Catholic school in Pangasinan, Philippines

Divine Word Academy of Dagupan Akademyang Banal na Salita ng Dagupan (Filipino)

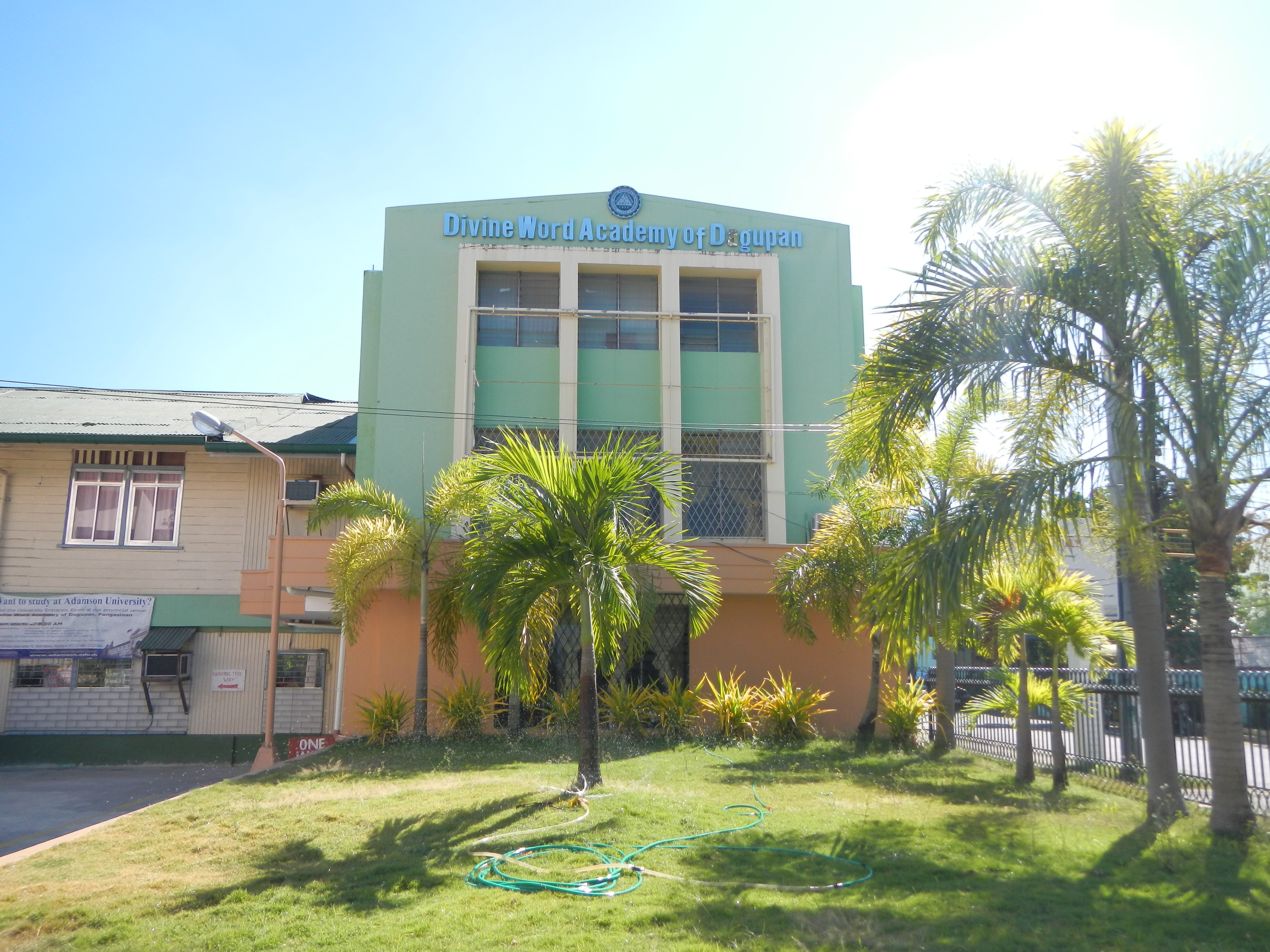
- Facade

Location
- Rizal Ext. St., Brgy. Pogo-Chico, Dagupan, Pangasinan; Philippines
- Coordinates: 16°2′24.44″N 120°20′23.91″E

Information
- Former name: St. Therese Chinese Academy (1957-1960)
- Type: Private, Roman Catholic coeducational basic education institution
- Motto: Love, Wisdom and Courage, Live in Christ!
- Religious affiliation(s): Roman Catholic (Divine Word Missionaries)
- Patron saint(s): St. Joseph Freinademetz (Feast Day: Jan. 29)
- Established: 1957; 68 years ago
- Founder: Bishop Therode Schu, SVD
- President: Rev. Fr. Reynaldo B. Jimenez, SVD
- Principal: Alicia J. Ferrer, MA Ed, MDM
- Campus: Urban
- Color(s): Green and white
- Song: DWAD Hymn
- Nickname: Divinian
- Affiliations: DWEA CEAP APSCU PAASCU
- Website: dwad.dagupan.com

The Divine Word Academy of Dagupan (simplified Chinese: 德兰中学; traditional Chinese: 德蘭中學; pinyin: Délán Zhōngxué; Pe̍h-ōe-jī: Tiak-lân Tiong-o̍h) (DWAD) is a private, Catholic, basic education institution run by the Philippine Northern Province of the Society of the Divine Word in Dagupan, Philippines. It was founded by the Divine Word Missionaries in 1957. It is one of the few schools in the Philippines that offer an education in Chinese culture in addition to the regular curricula required by the Department of Education (Philippines) and by private schools, in combination with the ideals of a Catholic education.

The academy is under the direction of the Divine Word Missionaries and was primarily established for the benefit of the Catholics of Chinese descent residing in Dagupan and the province of Pangasinan. The school equally welcomes all children regardless of race, color and religious creed.

The school’s director is Rev. Fr. Aljiovanie R. Abrasado, SVD.

== History ==
=== School directors ===
- Rev. Fr. Aljiovanie R. Abrasado, SVD (2023-Present)
- Rev. Fr. Reynaldo B. Jimenez, SVD (2020–2023)
- Rev. Fr. Edgar Calunod, SVD (2014–2020)
- Rev. Fr. Edsel R. Demillo, SVD (2009–2014)
- Rev. Fr. Crisogono Cancino, SVD (2005–2009)
- Rev. Fr. Ambrose Ponce, SVD (1996–2005)
- + Rev. Fr. Winston Cabahug, SVD (1992–1996)
- Rev. Fr. Jess Del Rosario, SVD (1987–1992)
- + Rev. Fr. Matthias Ning, SVD (1975–1987)
- + Rev. Fr. Henry Schmitz, SVD (1962–1975)
- + Rev. Fr. Hubert Lorbach, SVD (1958–1962)
- + Rev. Fr. Richard Hartwich, SVD (1957–1958)
- + Bishop Teodore Schu, SVD (1957)

=== School administrators ===
- Rev. Fr. Pablo G. Garay Jr., SVD (Finance Officer)
- Rev. Fr. Thomas Aquino N. Wele, SVD (Campus Minister)
- Ophelia Q. Vergonia (School Principal)

== Facilities ==
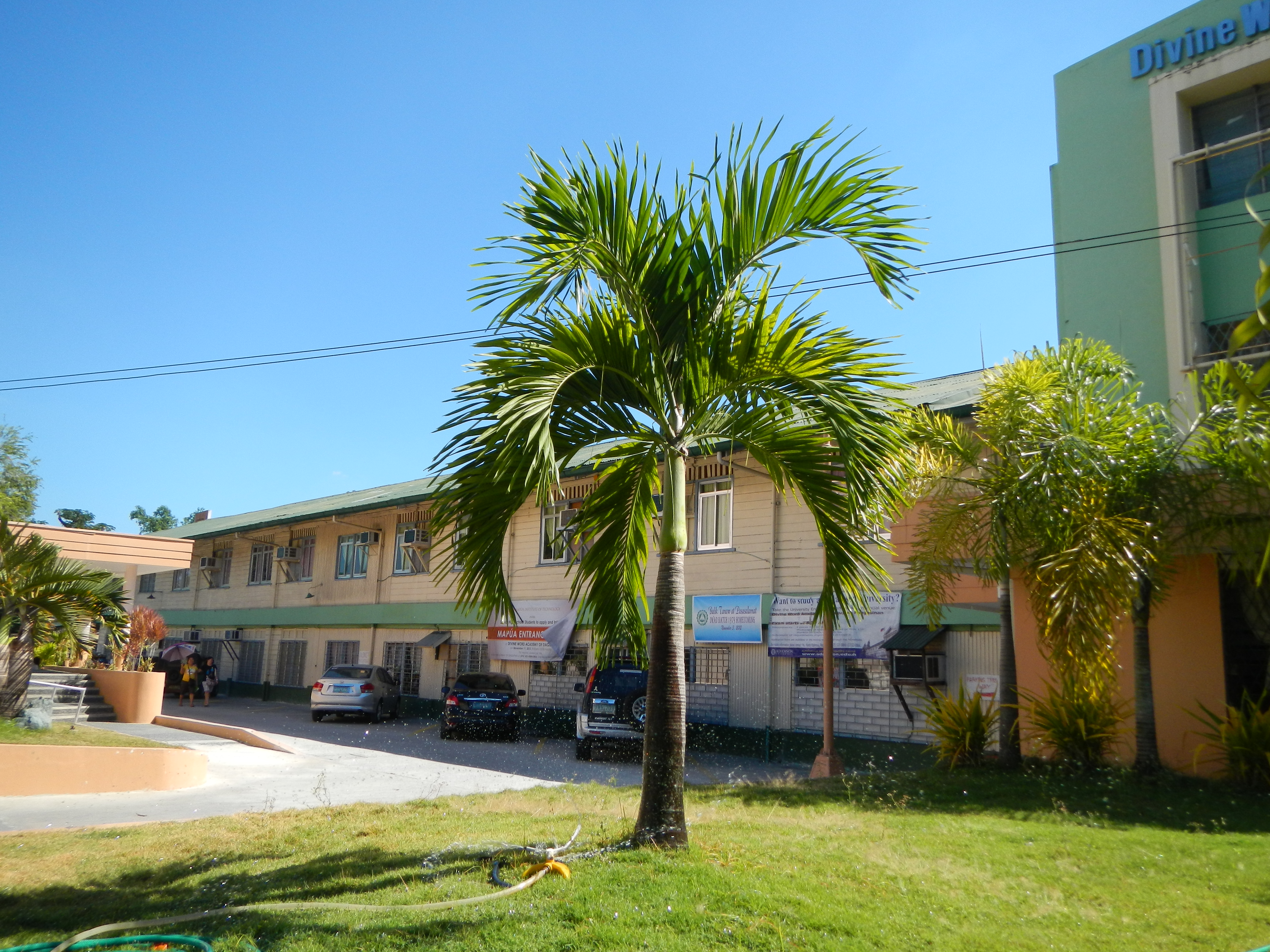
Left facade

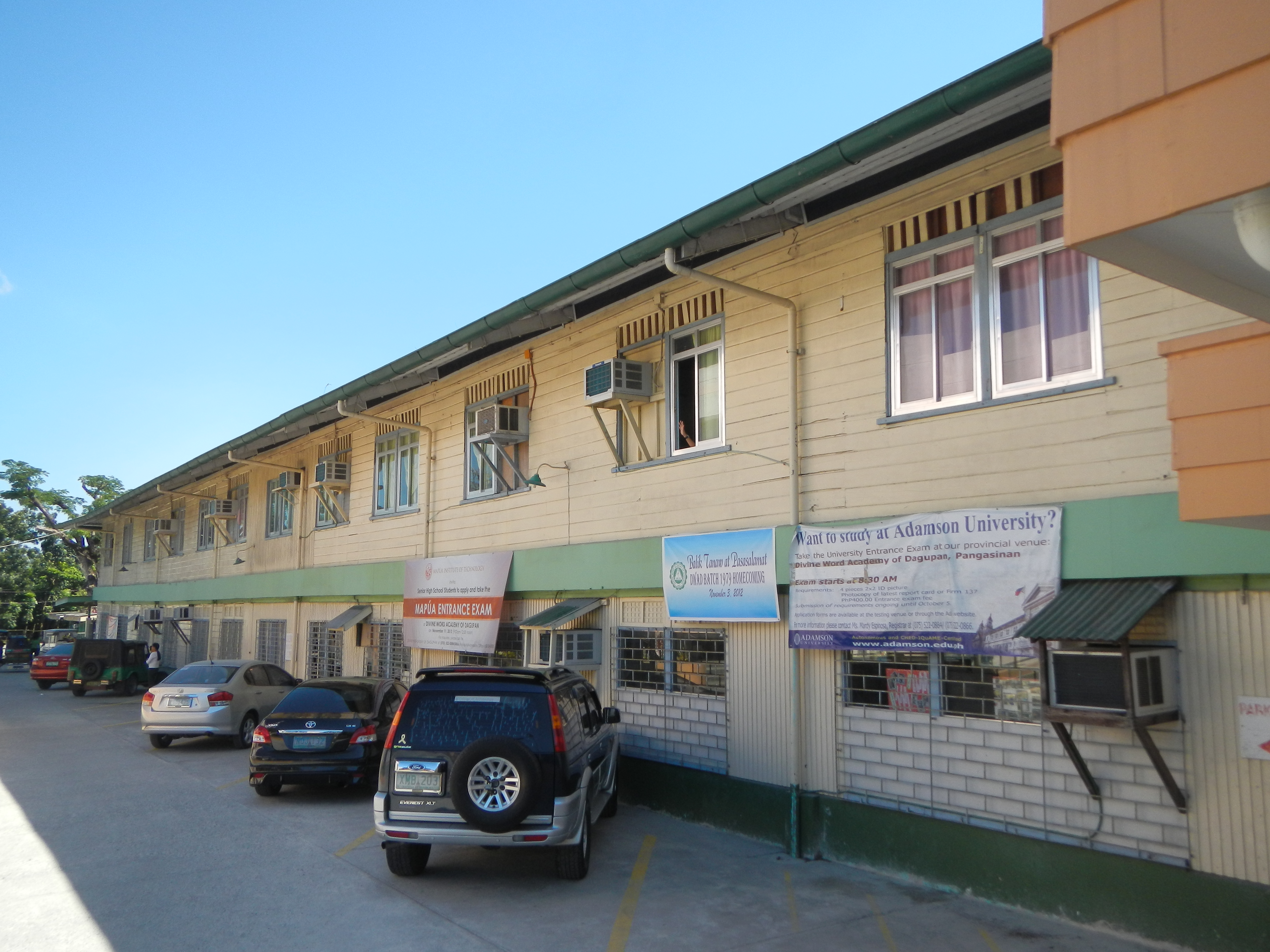
The classrooms and offices

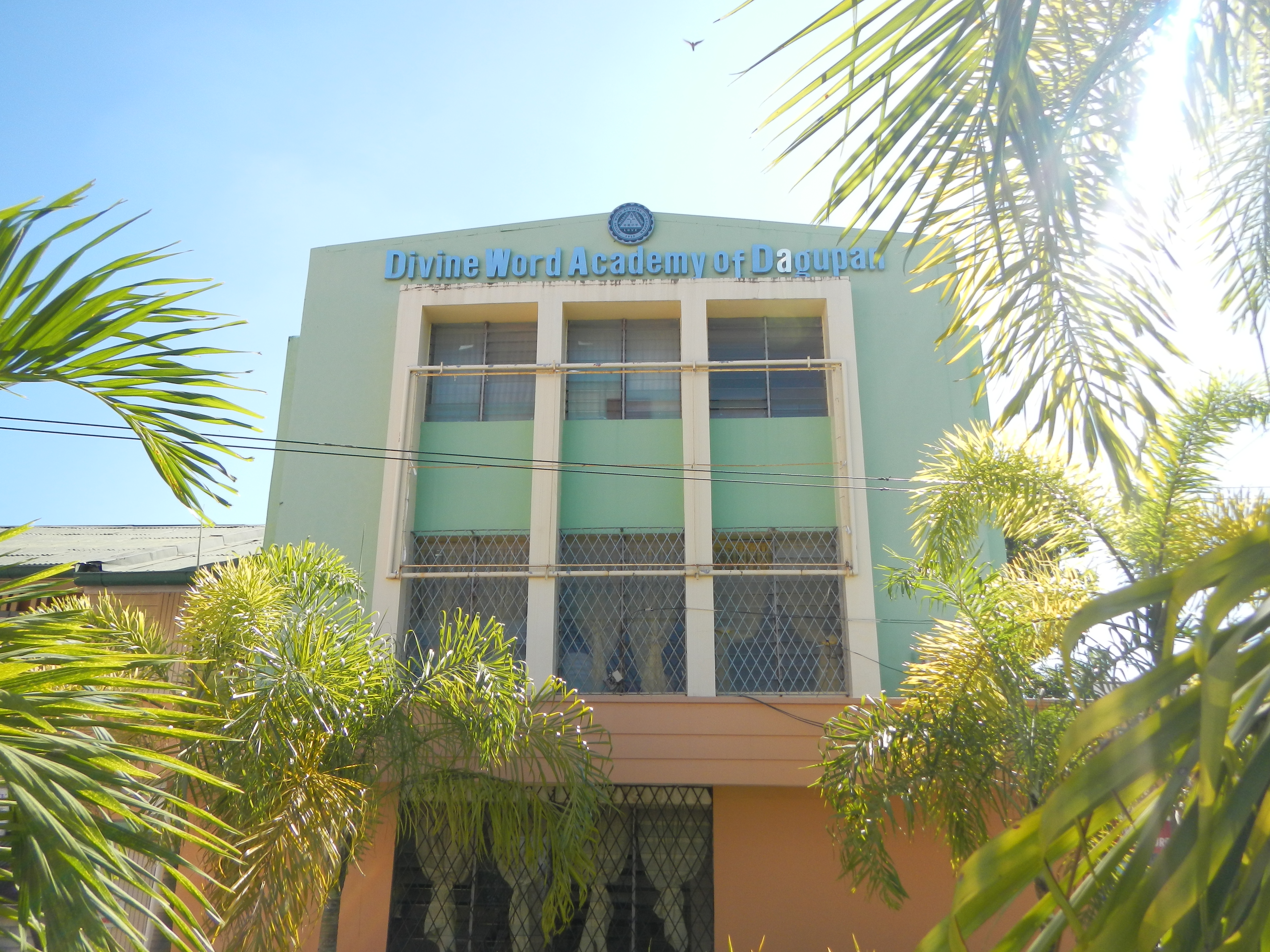
Frontage

== See also ==
- Divine Word College of Bangued – Bangued, Abra
- Divine Word College of Calapan – Calapan, Oriental Mindoro
- Divine Word College of Laoag – Gen. Segundo Ave., Laoag, Ilocos Norte
- Divine Word College of Legazpi – Rizal Street, Legazpi, Albay
- Divine Word College of San Jose – San Jose, Occidental Mindoro
- Divine Word College of Urdaneta – Urdaneta, Pangasinan
- Divine Word College of Vigan – Vigan, Ilocos Sur
- Divine Word University (DWU) – Tacloban, Leyte; closed in 1995, re-opened as Liceo del Verbo Divino
