= Divine Word College of Bangued =

Roman Catholic college in Abra, Philippines

- Dalubhasaang Banal na Salita ng Bangued (Filipino)
- Former name: Colegio del Sagrado Corazon (1920-1964)
- Motto: Scientia et Virtus (Latin)
- Motto in English: Knowledge and Virtue
- Type: Private Roman Catholic Non-profit Coeducational Basic and Higher education institution
- Established: 1920; 106 years ago
- Founders: Fr. Theodore Buttenbruch, SVD
- Religious affiliation: Roman Catholic (Divine Word Missionaries)
- Academic affiliations: DWEA CEAP PAASCU
- President: Rev. Fr. Edgar "Egay" L. Calunod, SVD
- Undergraduates: Approx.
- Postgraduates: Approx.
- Location: Rizal St., Zone 6, Bangued, Abra, Philippines; 17°35′58.57″N 120°36′46.85″E
- Campus: Urban
- Language: English, Tagalog, Iloco, Itneg
- Alma Mater song: DWCB Alma Mater Hymn
- Colors: Red - Yellow - Blue
- Nickname: Divinians
- Website: dwcbsims.com
- Location in the Luzon Location in the Philippines

The Divine Word College of Bangued is a private, Catholic higher education institution run by the Philippine Northern Province of the Society of the Divine Word in Bangued, Abra, Philippines. It was founded by a Divine Word Missionary priest in 1920 and given the name Colegio del Sagrado Corazon. In 1964 it was renamed the Divine Word College of Bangued.

== History ==
The Divine Word College of Bangued was founded in 1920 by Theodore Buttenbruch, a Catholic priest and member of the Society of the Divine Word. That year, Fr. Buttenbruch took over as parish priest of the parish of Bangued when the old parish priest died and felt the need of a catholic school in Bangued. With the help of some prominent men in the parish, he founded a coeducational school in a rented house. Initially named Colegio del Sagrado Corazon, it adopted the current name in 1964.

In June 1923, the school was entrusted to the Sister Servants of the Holy Spirit, who came to establish their community in Bangued. The old convent (the Holy Spirit Academy at present) was given as their cloister and utilized for additional classrooms.

During World War II, CSC's operations were disrupted. The campus was used as a base hospital and damaged in the 1945 bombing of Bangued. CSC reopened in 1946 using temporary Quonset huts provided by the U.S. Army. After the war, the college department was established in 1948, offering programs such as the Elementary Teacher's Certificate, Bachelor of Secondary Education, and Liberal Arts. The first college commencement exercises were held in 1950.

Eventually, Academic expansion continued with the opening of the Bachelor of Science in Commerce (1960). In 1964, the institution was officially renamed Divine Word College of Bangued (DWCB) better to reflect its mission and the identity of the SVD. In 1967, Fr. Panfilo Guianan, SVD, became the first Filipino Director. All departments from Grade School, High School, and College were unified on one campus under the school motto Scientia et Virtus. From 1973 until 1985, under the leadership of Fr. Ambrose Ponce, SVD, DWCB experienced major infrastructure growth, including the construction of Arnoldus Hall, Janssen Hall, and other academic facilities. Accreditation of major college programs was initiated.

Successive administrations after Fr. Ponce strengthened facilities, faculty benefits, and academic offerings. The school returned to a coeducational setup for Grade School and High School and reopened the Graduate School. New programs such as BS Nursing, BS Information Technology, BS Biology, and BS Industrial Education were introduced. Computer education was integrated across all programs, and the DWCB Research Center was established. Additional facilities were constructed, including speech laboratories, guidance offices, and academic buildings.

Under Fr. Brigido G. Angngasing, SVD, the school revised its Vision and Mission, expanded facilities for Hotel and Restaurant Management, and continued campus improvements while remaining faithful to its founding Catholic mission.

Currently, DWCB is under the administration of Rev. Fr. Edgar L. Calunod, SVD.

== Administration ==
The current President of the Divine Word College of Bangued is Rev. Fr. Edgar L. Calunod, SVD and is locally known as Fr. Egay. The Finance Officer of the school is Rev. Fr. Yohannes Bala, SVD. And lastly, Rev. Fr. Bernard Teneza, SVD, as the Campus minister.

Under the President is the current Academic Dean and Officer, Dr. Elmerita B. Palcon, Phd, while the Dean of Student Affairs is Ma'am Elizabeth M. Taloma, MATFil.

== Course offerings ==
DWCB offers Commission on Higher Education recognized programs in Arts, Education, Accountancy, Business Administration, Information Technology, Hospitality Management, and Nursing.

It also offers master's degrees in education, management, and business administration.

Starting in the Academic Year 2025-2026, the average tuition fee for a bachelor's degree at DWCB is between ₱13,000 and ₱30,000. DWCB's tuition fee per unit is ₱420, excluding miscellaneous fees.

== Departments and Programs ==
=== Basic Education ===
- Grade School Department
- High School Department

=== Higher Education ===
Teacher Education and Liberal Arts Department

- Bachelor of Arts in Political Science (AB Political Science)
- Bachelor in Early Childhood Education (BECEd)
- Bachelor in Elementary Education (BEEd)
- Bachelor in Secondary Education (BSEd) major in
  - Filipino
  - English
  - Science
  - Mathematics
  - Social Studies
  - Religious and Values Education

Business Administration Department

- Bachelor of Science in Business Administration (BSBA) major in
  - Financial Management
  - Operations Management
  - Marketing Management
  - Human Resource Management

Hospitality Management Department

- Bachelor of Science in Hospitality Management (BSHM)

Accountancy Department

- Bachelor of Science in Accountancy (BSAc)

Information Technology Department

- Bachelor of Science in Information Technology (BSIT)

Nursing Department

- Bachelor of Science in Nursing (BSN)

Graduate School Department

- Master of Arts in Education (MAEd)
- Master of Arts in Teaching (MAT) major in
  - Filipino
  - English
  - Science
  - Mathematics
  - Religious and Values Education
- Master in Business Administration (MBA)
- Master in Management (MM) major in
  - Public Management

== Campus ==
The main DWCB campus can be found at Rizal St., Zone 6, Bangued 2800, Abra.

== See also ==
- Divine Word Academy of Dagupan – Rizal Ext., Dagupan, Pangasinan
- Divine Word College of Calapan – Calapan, Oriental Mindoro
- Divine Word College of Laoag – Gen. Segundo Ave., Laoag, Ilocos Norte
- Divine Word College of Legazpi – Rizal Street, Legazpi, Albay
- Divine Word College of San Jose – San Jose, Occidental Mindoro
- Divine Word College of Urdaneta – Urdaneta, Pangasinan
- Divine Word College of Vigan – Vigan, Ilocos Sur
- Divine Word University (DWU) – Tacloban, Leyte; closed in 1995, re-opened as Liceo del Verbo Divino
