= Divine Word College of Calapan =

Roman Catholic college in Oriental Mindoro, Philippines

- Dalubhasaang Banal na Salita ng Calapan (Filipino)
- Former name: Mindoro Junior College (1946–1981)
- Motto: Your Future is Our Mission
- Type: Private Roman Catholic non-profit coeducational basic and higher education institution
- Established: April 1946; 80 years ago
- Founder: Society of the Divine Word
- Accreditation: PAASCU
- Religious affiliation: Roman Catholic (Verbites)
- Academic affiliations: DWEA; CEAP
- Chairman: Fr. Felino B. Javines Jr., SVD, D.M.
- President: Fr. Ramilo V. Mapaye, SVD, PhD
- Vice-president: Fr. Judy A. Bañez, SVD, PhD (VP for Administration); Fr. Paulus Karmani, SVD, MBA (VP for Finance); Fr. Felino B. Javines Jr., SVD, D.M. (VP for Academic Affairs)
- Principal: Ms. Mary Jane Divina Castillo, LPT, PhD (Basic Education)
- Faculty: 114 (2019)
- Students: 2,540 (2019)
- Location: Gov. Infantado St., Calapan City, Oriental Mindoro, Philippines; 13°24′38″N 121°10′31″E
- Campus: Urban Main Janssen Campus Brgy. Santa Maria Village (College) Satellite; Freinademetz Campus Pachoca, Calapan (Basic Education); Pinamalayan Campus Pinamalayan Oriental Mindoro
- Patron saint: Arnold Janssen; Joseph Freinademetz
- Colors: Green White
- Sporting affiliations: CCAA; PRISAA
- Website: dwcc.edu.ph
- Location in the Luzon Location in the Philippines

The Divine Word College of Calapan, also referred to by its acronym DWCC, is a private Catholic basic and higher education institution in Calapan, Oriental Mindoro, Philippines. It is run by the Philippine Central Province of the Society of the Divine Word. It was established by the Divine Word Missionaries in April 1946 and was then called Mindoro Junior College until January 1981. The academic programs offered on its first year of operation were normal education, liberal arts, pre-law, including short term courses in typing and stenography (July 1, 1946).

== Academics ==
=== Schools ===
- School of Accountancy
- School of Business, Hospitality, and Tourism Management
- School of Information and Technology
- School of Engineering
- School of Architecture and Fine Arts
- School of Education
- School of Arts and Sciences
- School of Criminal Justice
- Graduate School

=== Graduate programs ===
- Doctor of Philosophy in Management (PhD)
- Doctor of Philosophy in Educational Management (PhD)
- Doctor of Philosophy in English Language (PhD)
- Master of Arts in Education (MAEd)
  - Major in:
    - Administration and Supervision
    - English Language Teaching
    - English Literature
    - Filipino
    - Mathematics
    - Science Education
    - Social Science Teaching
- Master in Business Administration (MBA)
  - Thesis and Non-Thesis
- Master in Public Administration (MPA)
  - Thesis and Non-Thesis

=== Degree programs ===
- Bachelor of Science in Accountancy
- Bachelor of Science in Management Accounting
- Bachelor of Science in Architecture
- Bachelor of Science in Information Technology
- Bachelor of Science in Computer Engineering
- Bachelor of Science in Civil Engineering
- Bachelor of Science in Electrical Engineering
- Bachelor of Science in Electronics and Communications Engineering
- Bachelor of Science in Hospitality Management
- Bachelor of Science in Tourism Management
- Bachelor of Science in Business Administration
  - Major in:
    - Marketing Management
    - Operations Management
    - Financial Management
- Bachelor of Science in Criminology
- Bachelor of Science in Psychology
- Bachelor of Arts in Political Science
- Bachelor of Arts in Psychology
- Bachelor of Elementary Education
  - Major in:
    - Early Childhood Education
- Bachelor of Secondary Education
  - Major in:
    - English
    - Filipino
    - Mathematics
    - General Sciences
    - Values Education
- Bachelor of Fine Arts

=== TESDA programs ===
- Food and Beverage Services NC II (356 Hours)
- Housekeeping NC II (436 Hours)
- Bread and Pastry Production NC II (141 Hours)
- Computer System Servicing NC II (280 Hours)

== Activities ==
=== The DWCC Gazette ===
The DWCC Gazette is the official student publication of DWCC, published twice every semester.

==== Sections ====
- News
- Opinion/editorial
- Features
- Literary
- Development and communications
- Sports
- Comics

==== Katha Literary Folio ====
Katha, an acronym for Kalipunan ng mga Akdang Tumatalakay sa mga Hinaing ng mga Aba, is the official literary folio of the DWCC Gazette published once a year, released between November and February.

The word katha is an old Tagalog word for "creation."

==== Awards and recognitions ====
- Sep 2003 - Overall Champion, first Mimaropa Higher Education Press Conference
- Sep 2004 - Overall Champion, second Mimaropa Higher Education Press Conference
- 2006 - Best Tabloid Award, 14th CEGP Regional Press Conference 2006
- Nov 2007 - Best Newsletter, fourth Regional Higher Education Press Conference
- Nov 2007 - second Place, Best Tabloid Award, fourth Regional Higher Education Press Conference
- Nov 2007 - second Over-all Winner, fourth Regional Higher Education Press Conference
- Jan 2009 - second Over-all Winner, fifth Regional Higher Education Press Conference
- Feb 2010 - Overall Champion, sixth Mimaropa Higher Education Press Conference
- Feb 2010 - Best Broadsheet, ninth Luzonwide Higher Education Press Conference
- Dec 2012 - Best Tabloid, Mimaropa Higher Education Press Conference
- Nov 2022 - Best Student Organ, National 44th Catholic Mass Media Awards

== Campuses ==
The Divine Word College of Calapan is housed in three campuses: two campuses in Calapan and the other in Pinamalayan, Oriental Mindoro.

- College Departments and Administrative Offices: Janssen Campus, Sta. Maria Village, Calapan
- Basic Education Departments: Freinademetz Campus, Tibag, Calapan; Pinamalayan.

== See also ==
- Divine Word Academy of Dagupan – Rizal Ext., Dagupan, Pangasinan
- Divine Word College of Bangued – Bangued, Abra
- Divine Word College of Laoag – Gen. Segundo Ave., Laoag, Ilocos Norte
- Divine Word College of Legazpi – Rizal Street, Legazpi, Albay
- Divine Word College of San Jose – San Jose, Occidental Mindoro
- Divine Word College of Urdaneta – Urdaneta, Pangasinan
- Divine Word College of Vigan – Vigan, Ilocos Sur
- Divine Word University (DWU) – Tacloban, Leyte; closed in 1995, re-opened as Liceo del Verbo Divino
