= Liceo del Verbo Divino =

Roman Catholic school in Tacloban, Philippines

Liceo del Verbo Divino, Inc.
- School seal

Location
- Tacloban; Philippines
- 11°14′26″N 125°00′02″E

Information
- Former names: Tacloban Catholic Institute (1929-1946); St. Paul’s College of Tacloban (1946-1965); Divine Word College of Tacloban (1965-1966); Divine Word University of Tacloban (1966-1995)
- Type: Private, Catholic basic education institution
- Motto: Vivite Verbum Dei (Latin)
- Religious affiliations: Roman Catholic (Divine Word Missionaries)
- Established: 1929; 97 years ago
- Founders: Society of the Divine Word
- Nickname: Divinians
- Website: lvd.edu.ph

The Liceo del Verbo Divino, Inc., also referred to by its acronym LVD, is a private, Catholic, co-educational basic education institution run by the Philippine Southern Province of the Society of the Divine Word in Tacloban City, Philippines. It was founded by the Divine Word Missionaries in 1929.

Liceo del Verbo Divino, Inc. was formerly the Divine Word University of Tacloban. The latter was closed in June 1995 by the school administrators after a court ruling favoring the labor union which is composed of its faculty members and other employees. In 2006, DWU reopened its doors with a new administration and a new name, Liceo del Verbo Divino. It currently offers Basic Education (preschool, elementary, junior high school, and senior high school).

== History ==
=== Collective bargaining ===
Two prolonged strikes occurred in 1988 and in 1989. From the start the administrators were unwilling to negotiate with the union. Instead of accepting the union's right to represent the workers on the basis of signed memberships, they demanded a certification election. Union leaders were antagonized with this approach. In addition, the administration's lawyers advised them to attempt to form a parallel union of their own which would be more favorable to the administration, but the court considered this to be "union busting".

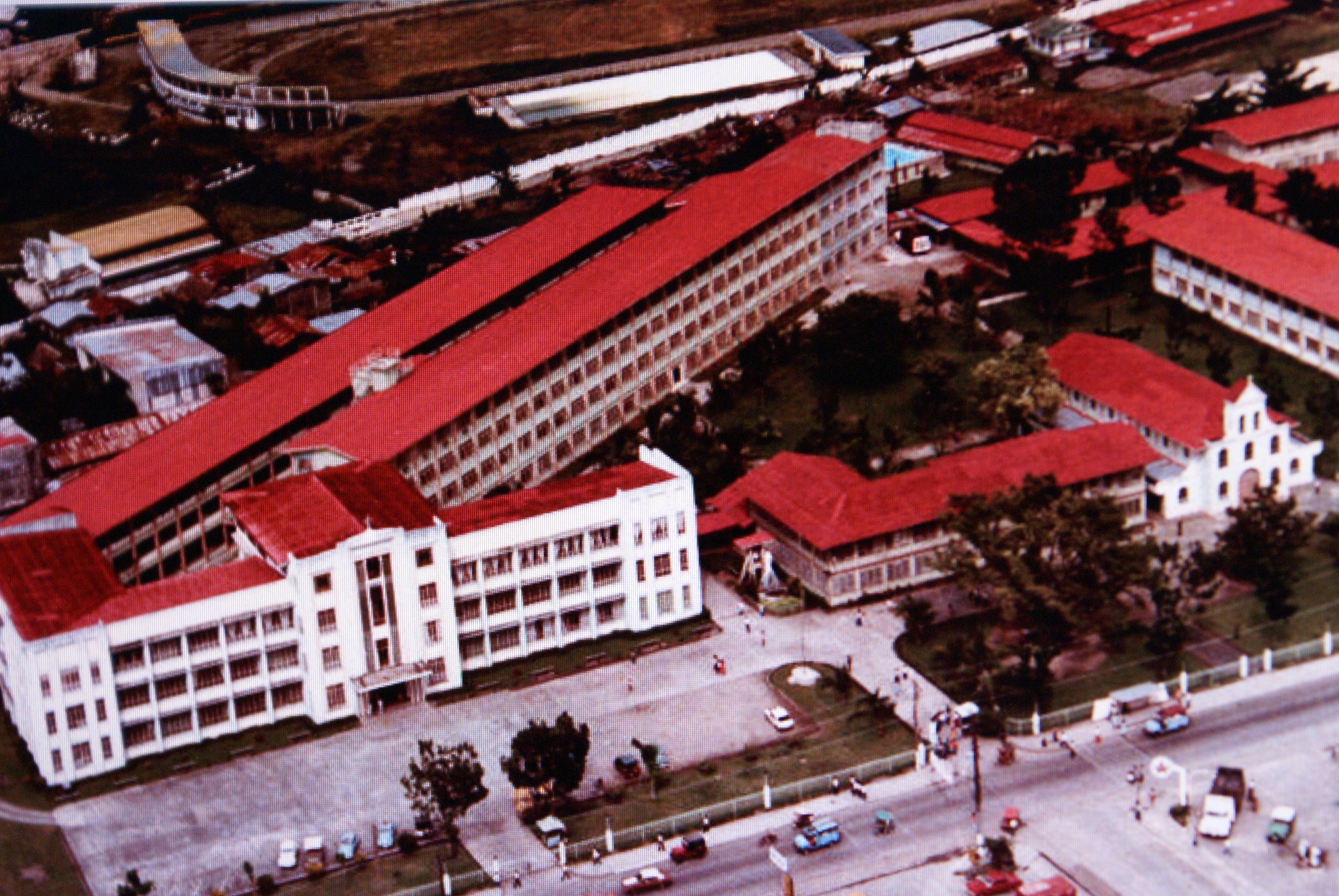
Aerial view of Liceo del Verbo Divino, Tacloban City, Philippines

In 1990 the Supreme Court of the Philippines ruled in favor of the labor union: "In Divine Word University of Tacloban vs. Secretary of Labor and Employment, petitioner therein, Divine Word University of Tacloban, refused to perform its duty to bargain collectively. Thus, we upheld the unilateral imposition on the university of the CBA proposed by the Divine Word University Employees Union. We said further: 'That being the said case, the petitioner may not validly assert that its consent should be a primordial consideration in the bargaining process. By its acts, no less than its action which bespeak its insincerity, it has forfeited whatever rights it could have asserted as an employer.' "

The university administration still refused to negotiate. Administrative Officer Fr. Margarito Alingasa, SVD announced the closure of the university in June 1995. Students, faculty and staff were left with no school and no employment. Many in the community were affected, including boarding houses, tricycle drivers and the Tacloban business community. Supporters of the university administration claim that the "selfishness of union members" led to the closure, and that faculty and staff had been promised "exorbitant amounts" if they joined the union.

Liceo del Verbo Divino entrance facade

=== Recent developments ===
In June 2000 the Divine Word Hospital opened St. Scholastica College of Tacloban, renting the Janssen Building of the University for classroom use and office space. Courses were offered in nursing, medical technology, biology and pharmacy.

On February 21, 2006, the SVD announced the reopening of the Divine Word University of Tacloban under a new school name: "Liceo del Verbo Divino," though still under the SVD management. A signing ceremony was held at the Santo Niño Church after the Holy Mass held in celebration of the birthday of Most Rev. Archbishop Pedro Dean. This came ten years after the DWU shut down in 1995 after the dispute with faculty and other employees.

=== Highlights ===
- 1929 DWU began as the Tacloban Catholic Institute (TCI), founded by Bishop Sofronio Hacbang of the then Diocese of Leyte and Samar, Justice Norberto Romualdez, Sr., Gov. Bernardo Torres and Cong. Juan Pérez of Leyte, and educator Martin de Veyra. It was initially an elementary school with 78 students. Rt. Rev. Msgr. Vicente Figueroa was the first Director.
- 1934 The High School Department was opened.
- 1935 St. Therese of the Child Jesus was declared Patroness of TCI, and a chapel was dedicated in her honor.
- 1940 Bishop Manuel Mascarinas of the Palo Diocese turned over the administration of TCI to the Society of the Divine Word (SVD). Fr. Eugene Stoll, SVD, was the first SVD Director.
- 1942 The College Department was established under Fr. Luis Paulsen, SVD, with the opening of the Secretarial Course.
- 1944 TCI temporarily ceased operations when the Japanese Army occupied the school buildings.
- 1946 The School reopened as St. Paul’s College of Tacloban (SPCT) with Fr. Alberto van Gansewinkel as the first Director.
- 1958 The SVD acquired SPCT from the Diocese of Palo under Archbishop Leo Gonzaga.
- 1965 Founding of St. Paul’s Hospital, a 100-bed general hospital, as the teaching hospital of SPCT, under the administration of the Benedictine Sisters (OSB). SPCT now became the Divine Word College of Tacloban (DWCT) with Fr. Ernest Hoerdemann, SVD, as the first college president.
- 1966 DWCT achieved university status, and became Divine Word University of Tacloban (DWU), with Fr. Ernest Hoerdemann, SVD, as the first university president.
- 1995 DWU closed down due to a disagreement with its labor union, causing severe dislocation in its region.
- 2006 The SVD announced the reopening of the campus under the name "Liceo del Verbo Divino".
- 2007 Liceo del Verbo Divino reopened its doors to Grade 1 pupils and First Year High School students.

== DWU Jubilee Foundation, Inc. ==
DWU Jubilee Foundation, Inc.
- Type: Alumni Association
- Founded: 2000, Philippines
- Headquarters: Tacloban City, Philippines
- Key people: Board of Directors: Louis Ocana; Paul Bolaños; Jaime Bermejo; Sara Q. Caballes; Athena Cloma-Granados; Flerida Creencia; Wilfredo Garrido; Alberto Lamayo; Cesar Merin; Imelda Nartea; Fideliza Noel; Natividad Noel-Alejo; Leo Rama; Tarcelo Sabarre; Ma. Luz C. Vilches; Samuel J. Yap; Board of Trustees: Fideliza G. Noel (Chairperson); Samuel J. Yap; Athena C. Granados; Leo R. Rama; Natividad Noel-Alejo; Wilfredo Garrido; Flerida V. Creencia; Ma. Luz C. Vilches

In the early months of 2000, a DWU Jubilee Association was established in Manila in an attempt to mobilize the alumni from the university and former students, staff and friends the world over to bring the Divine Word University back to life. Local chapters of the association were planned for Tacloban City, the United States and Europe.

== Notable alumni and professors ==
- Imelda Marcos, Congresswoman of Ilocos Norte (2010–2019); Governor of Metro Manila (1975–1986); 10th First Lady of the Philippines
- Ted Failon, current news anchor for News5 and former representative of the 1st district of Leyte (2001–2004)
- Marcelino Libanan, member of the House of Representatives of the Philippines

== See also ==
- Divine Word Academy of Dagupan – Rizal Ext., Dagupan, Pangasinan
- Divine Word College of Bangued – Bangued, Abra
- Divine Word College of Calapan – Calapan, Oriental Mindoro
- Divine Word College of Laoag – Gen. Segundo Ave., Laoag, Ilocos Norte
- Divine Word College of Legazpi – Rizal Street, Legazpi, Albay
- Divine Word College of San Jose – San Jose, Occidental Mindoro
- Divine Word College of Urdaneta – Urdaneta, Pangasinan
- Divine Word College of Vigan – Vigan, Ilocos Sur
