= Crescentius Richard Duerr =

Bro. Crescentius Richard F.S.C.
- Born: Richard Henry Duerr; 1922; Brooklyn, New York
- Died: June 18, 2005 (aged 82–83); Lincroft, New Jersey
- Occupation: De La Salle Brother
- Title: President of De La Salle College
- Term: 1961–1966

Brother Crescentius Richard, F.S.C. (born Richard Henry Duerr; 1922 – June 18, 2005), was an American De La Salle Brother who was instrumental in the transformation of the De La Salle University in the Philippines into a pillar of Philippine education. He was President of De La Salle University from 1961 to 1966 and was named its President Emeritus in 1981.

== Early life ==
He was born Richard Henry Duerr in 1922 in Brooklyn, New York, the third of four children. He studied at St. James Diocesan High School in Loughlin and St. Joseph's Normal Institute in Barrytown, New York, graduating valedictorian from both schools. In 1935, at the age of 13, he entered the junior novitiate of the Christian Brothers in New York and began his postulancy on June 26, 1936. On September 7, 1936, he received the religious habit and was given the religious name Crescentius Richard.

In 1941, Brother Duerr earned a Bachelor of Science, with major in Chemistry and a minor in Biology, from The Catholic University of America and in 1948, he received his Master's degree from Fordham University.

== Early career ==
Upon Duerr's graduation from the Catholic University of America, he began a career of teaching. He spent the first 12 years of that career in New York City and Washington, D.C., handling a variety of students, from fifth graders at Saint Mary's Parochial School in New York to the college students of the Manhattan College or La Salle College, teaching General Chemistry, Qualitative and Quantitative Analysis, College Mathematics, and the General Science, among others.

== Assignment to the Philippines ==
In 1953 Duerr volunteered for mission service and was assigned to the Philippines, being first posted to De La Salle College. He was assigned to La Salle Academy-Iligan in 1958, the University of St. La Salle in Bacolod in 1969, and La Salle Green Hills in 1980.

=== Presidency of De La Salle College ===
In 1961, Duerr was appointed President of De La Salle College. During his term, he was instrumental in accomplishing the college's post-World War II growth including the conferment of academic accreditations upon the college. He also institutionalized the use of modern management techniques such as educational planning and budgeting to promote efficiency and initiated the formation of a board of trustees and the incorporation of the school as a non-stock, non-profit corporation. During his term, he also oversaw the construction of De La Salle University's William Hall. On July 17, 1981, in recognition of his contributions to the growth of the Lasallian schools in the Philippines, Br. Richard was conferred the title of President Emeritus by De La Salle University.

== Return to the United States ==
In 1984, after his stint at La Salle Green Hills, Duerr chose to settle down to Lincroft, New Jersey. He was thus assigned to the Christian Brothers Provincialate in Lincroft in 1984 to De La Salle Hall in 1987 and to the Christian Brothers Academy in 1992. In 2001, he was again posted at De La Salle Hall, where he stayed until his death on June 18, 2005.

Preceded by Br. Denis of Mary FSC	President of De La Salle College; 1961-1966	Succeeded by Br. Hyacinth Gabriel FSC
