= Divine Word College of San Jose =

Roman Catholic college in Occidental Mindoro, Philippines

- Dalubhasaang Banal na Salita sa San Jose (Filipino)
- Latin: Ecclesiasticus Sancti Iosephus Collegium Verbi Divini
- Former names: Southern Mindoro Academy (1945–1960); Divine Word Academy (1961–1966)
- Motto: Witness to the Word
- Type: Private Catholic research coeducational basic and higher education institution (HEI)
- Established: August 8, 1945; 81 years ago
- Founders: Atty. Gabriel F. Fabella; Dr. Felix Gabriel; Federico Castillo
- Accreditation: PAASCU
- Religious affiliation: Roman Catholic (Verbites)
- Academic affiliations: DWEA; CEAP
- President: Rev. Fr. Crispin A. Cordero, SVD
- Vice-president: List of VPs: Chona T. Jarabata PhD (VP for Academic Affairs); Br. Florencio S. Jacela SVD (VP for Administration); Fr. Paulus Karmani SVD (VP for Finance); Jason S. Valera PhD (VP for Basic Education)
- Dean: List of Deans: Luis I. Gante Jr. PhD (Dean of College); Jason S. Valera PhD (Dean of Teacher Education Department); Fr. Joel Sagdullas SVD (Dean of Graduate School); Fr. Felino B. Javines Jr. SVD (Dean of Graduate School)
- Academic staff: 32–40 (2017–2020) (Note: College faculty)
- Students: 2,441 (2017)
- Undergraduates: 857 (2017)
- Location: General Lukban Street, Barangay 8, San Jose, Occidental Mindoro, 5100, Philippines; 12°21′10″N 121°04′13″E
- Campus: Urban; 15,788 m^{2} (1.58 ha) (Note: Approximation based on data from Google Maps)
- Newspaper: The Pioneer
- Patron saints: St. Arnold Janssen; St. Joseph Freinademetz
- Colors: Orange Green
- Nickname: Divinians
- Sporting affiliations: PRISAA; ICSSAM
- Website: dwcsj.edu.ph

DWCSJ Hymn
- Choral version performed by DWCSJ Choir accompanied by the DWCSJ Marching Band. Conducted by Mr. Arnold Napas: file; help

The Divine Word College of San Jose is a private, Catholic, coeducational basic and higher education institution run by the Philippine Central Province of the Society of the Divine Word or SVD in San Jose, Occidental Mindoro, Philippines. It holds the distinction of being the first and oldest educational institution in Mindoro island, even predating the island-province's separation in 1950 into two provinces by five years.

Established as Southern Mindoro Academy in the middle of 1945 by Gabriel Fabrero Fabella, a lawyer and prominent historian, the secondary school became exclusive to boys upon its incorporation into the Society of Divine Word (SVD) in 1960. It was renamed to Divine Word Academy a year after its acquisition by the SVD, and again to Divine Word College in 1966, and has since offered complete academic courses from basic to tertiary education and postgraduate and vocational programs. Its patron saints are St. Arnold Janssen, the founder of the Society of the Divine Word, and St. Joseph Freinademetz, a missionary priest in China.

== History ==
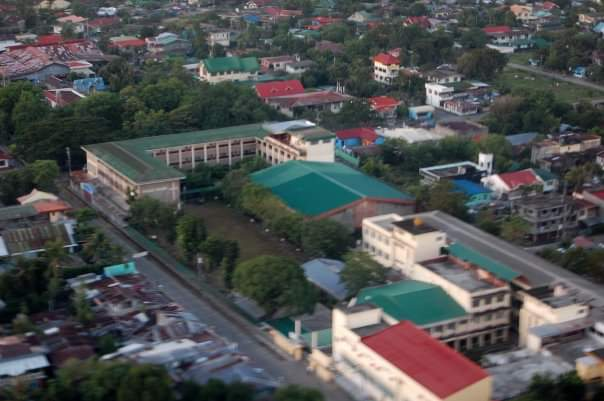
Aerial shot of Divine Word College of San Jose seen from northeast side, captured in 2011

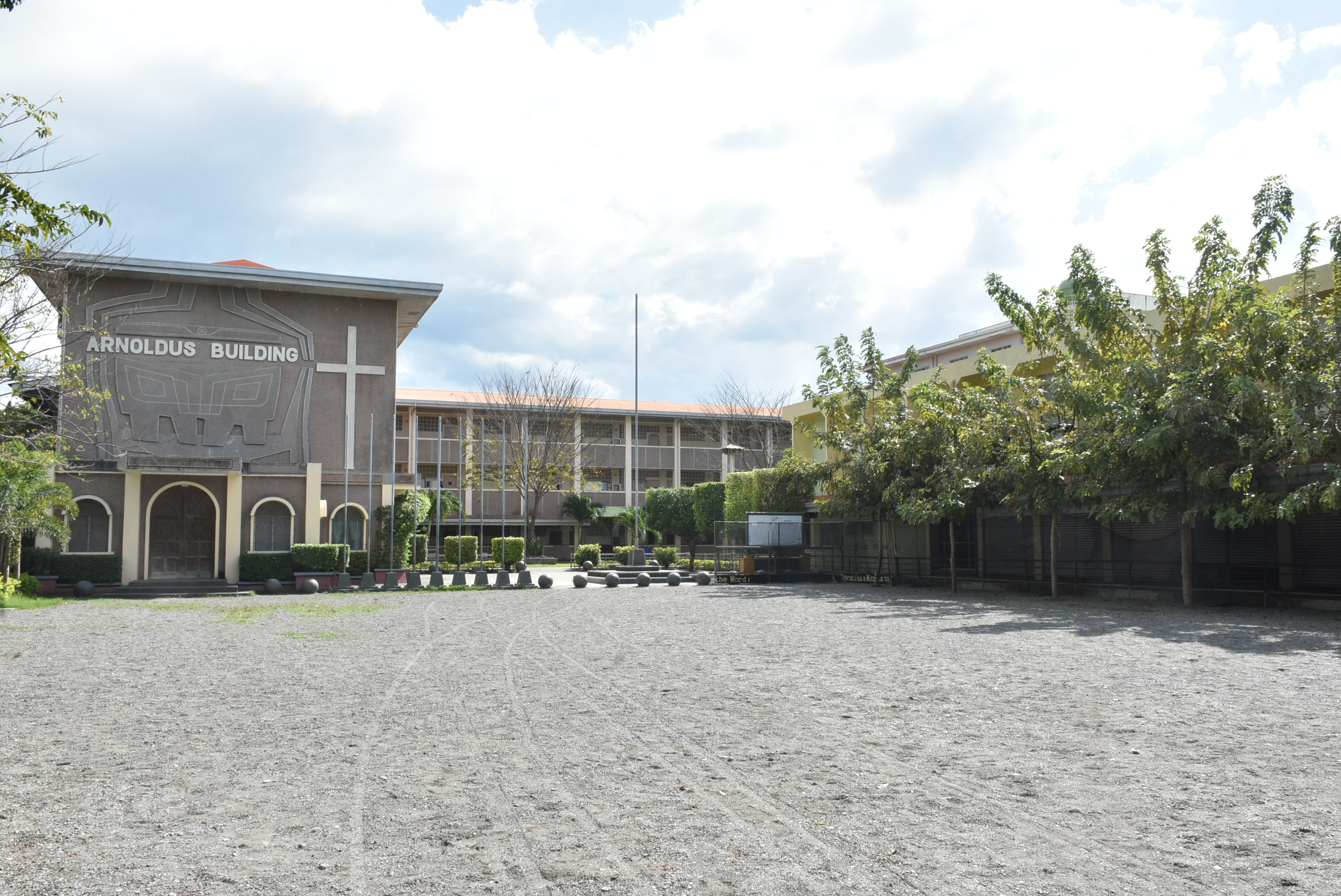
Arnoldus Building seen from a distance, which houses the basic education level

The history of Divine Word College of San Jose (DWCSJ) traces its roots to Atty. Gabriel F. Fabella, a UP history professor from Romblon, who envisioned establishing a private secondary school in the town of San Jose towards the end of the Second World War. This led to the founding of Southern Mindoro Academy (SMA) on August 8, 1945, with 30 freshmen and 8 sophomores. The school operated as a non-sectarian institution, with original incorporators including Fabella and other local figures. (Note: These included former congressman Raul Leuterio, former mayor Isabelo Abeleda Sr, former governor Cipriano Liboro, and Cosme Tria)

In 1946, as San Jose saw growth due to the construction of an American airstrip, (Note: San Jose Airport, then known as McGuire Field) SMA moved to a new location, purchased from the Soldevilla family. However, in 1960, due to financial constraints, SMA was sold to the Society of the Divine Word (SVD) in May of that year after 15 years of operation, with Rev. Fr. Carlos Brendel representing the SVD and Mena Quinto facilitating the buyout. The secondary department became an all-boys school, while St. Joseph became exclusive for girls.

DWCSJ began expanding its academic portfolio in the following decades, gaining government recognition for various programs that include Junior Secretarial Diploma (1978), Accountancy (1993), and Computer Science courses (1997). (Note: Two-year Computer Secretarial and Associate Computer Science courses in 1997, and BS Computer Science in 2001) The school also introduced graduate programs such as Master of Arts in Education on March 15, 1995 and Master of Business Administration on June 29, 1993 independent of Divine Word College of Calapan (DWCC).

In the late 1990s and 2000s, DWCSJ introduced new undergraduate programs, including Communications, Hotel and Restaurant Management, Tourism, Nursing, Accounting Technology, and Information Technology. During the COVID-19 pandemic in 2020, the school transitioned to online distance learning to ensure the safety of its students and staff.

== Academic profile ==
=== Continuing Professional Development ===
Divine Word College of San Jose is an accredited "Continuing Professional Development (CPD) Provider for Professional Teachers" granted by the Professional Regulation Commission in 2017 as one of its regulated programs. A CPD provider refers to a natural or juridical person accredited by the CPD Council to conduct Continuing Professional Development Programs as defined by Republic Act (R.A.) 10912, "An Act mandating and strengthening the Continuing Professional Development Program for all regulated professions, creating the Continuing Professional Development Council, and appropriating funds therefor, and for other related purposes".

Divine Word College of San Jose is duly accredited by Commission on Higher Education (CHED No. 04022) and the Department of Education (DepEd No. 403421). The school is also a member of Philippine Accrediting Association of Schools, Colleges and Universities (PAASCU), with accreditations from the body to operate basic education and business administration programs. It is also an institutional member of the Catholic Educational Association of the Philippines (CEAP) and the Divine Word Educational Apostolate (DWEA).

=== Rankings and reputation ===
The table below shows the school's performance in the past four licensure exams for each listed professional licensing board, encompassing both first timers and repeaters: (Note: Percentage ratings were rounded off (breakdown of scores and the number of examinees were provided on the reference notes); rankings were computed using MS Excel RANK function)

| Examination | Passing Rates | Rank in the Philippines | | Ref. |
|---|---|---|---|---|
| 2023 Licensure Exam for Secondary Teacher | 34% (above average) | 966^{th} | of 2,029 schools | (Note: Rankings for LET were only rough estimates as the documents used have limited access) |
| 2023 Licensure Exam for Elementary Teacher | 40% (above average) | 909^{th} | of 1,362 schools | |
| 2016 CPA Licensure Exam | 15% (below average) | 267^{th} | of 462 schools | |
| 2012 Nursing Licensure Exam | 47% (below average) | 155^{th} | of 478 schools | |

=== Scholarship programs ===
In response to tuition hikes and concessions made by the board, the student body and other stakeholders, the school implements a socialized tuition program categorized into basic components such as Subsidized Education, Scholarship Grants, and Student Assistantships with the help of various sectors and partner agencies such as the Department of Education (DepEd) through the PEAC Fund, Commission on Higher Education (CHED), local government units (LGUs), charitable institutions, and stipend allowances for part-time working students and other financial assistance and student loan programs. These assistance programs are listed as follows:

- Academic scholars
- Alay-Lakad scholars
- Ayala-Yuchengco Foundation
- Bishop Vicente Manuel Foundation Inc.
- CHED StuFAP (Student Financial Assistance Program)
- CHED UniFAST (Unified Student Financial Assistance System for Tertiary Education) (subsidy)
- DOLE - SPES (Department of Labor and Employment - Special Program for the Employment of Students)
- DWCSJ Working Scholars
- Private Education Assistance Committee: Educational Service Contracting (ESC)
- Provincial scholars/Congressional scholars
- San Jose Municipal Scholarship Program

== Organization ==
Presidents of the Divine Word College of San Jose
| Name | Tenure of office |
| Fr. Federico Limon SVD | 1960–1967 |
| Fr. Albert Cook SVD | 1967–1970 |
| Fr. John Patrick McSherry SVD | 1970–1975 |
| Fr. Ernesto Lagura SVD | 1975–1979 |
| Fr. Joel Maribao SVD | 1979–1982 |
| | 1988-1990 |
| Fr. Bonifacio Guanlao SVD | 1982–1985 |
| Fr. Gregorio Buenavista SVD | 1985–1988 |
| Fr. Virgilio Bartolome SVD | 1988 |
| Fr. Eleuterio Lacaron SVD | 1990–2005 |
| Fr. Ernesto Vitor SVD | 2005–2011 |
| Fr. Glenn Paul Gomez SVD | 2011–2017 |
| Fr. Renato A. Tampol SVD | 2017–2023 |
| Fr. Felino B. Javines Jr SVD | 2023–2026 |
| Fr. Crispin A. Cordero SVD | Incumbent |
Assistant Director
| Name | Tenure of office |
| Fr. Erasio Flores SVD | 1960-1967 |
| References |

=== Presidents of the Divine Word College of San Jose ===
The President of the Divine Word College of San Jose is elected by the Board of Trustees for a three-year term and may be re-elected. The longest serving president was Rev. Fr. Eleuterio Lacaron SVD who held the office for five consecutive terms for a total of fifteen (15) years from 1990 to 2005, while Rev. Fr. Virgilio Bartolome SVD served the shortest term of a single interim year in 1988.

As of 2026, two Americans and 12 Filipinos served as President of the Divine Word College of San Jose. Rev. Fr. Erasio Flores SVD served as Assistant Director to Rev. Fr. Limon during his single term from 1960 to 1967. Rev. Fr. Joel Maribao SVD served two non-consecutive terms, first was in 1979 to 1982 and again in 1988 to 1990.

The current and 15th president is Rev. Fr. Crispin A. Cordero SVD, MSBA, an MBA graduate of Saint Louis University in Baguio City and held the same role at Divine Word College of Legazpi from 2008 to 2017 and Divine Word College of Calapan from 2017 to 2026. He did missionary works in Togo and Benin in the 90s and also served as Vice President for Administration at Saint Jude Catholic School. His installation as president took place at an investiture ceremony held on August 25, 2026 and has assumed office since then.

=== Student government ===
The College Student Council (CSC) is the highest student governing body, encompassing all presidents and student leaders from different college departments and organizations. The council conducts various activities and forums such as symposiums on anti-bullying, anti-harassment and anti-drug, and leadership trainings to help raise awareness to students.

Guided by Ms. Ana Mae Tividad, Directress of Office of Student Affairs, the student council is a delegate to the 2014 National Congress of College Councils (NCCC) held at UP Diliman on March 7, 2014, through its president acting as Regional Ambassador for MIMAROPA region, and as such, a member of the National Alliance of Youth Leaders (NAYL). The council is also a delegate to the 10th PAPSAS (Philippine Association of Practitioners of Student Affairs and Services, Inc.) Interactive Youth Forum and Workshop for student leaders held on September 20, 2018, at Dauis, Bohol. The student council yearly conducts its election through a computerized system that started in July 2014.

=== Student newspaper ===
The Pioneer
Cover page for June–November 2018 issue
Editorial Board (2018–2019)
| Editor-in-chief | Leonila D. Laab |
| Associate editor | Rica Mae S. Diosay |
| Managing editors | Maricoe Venn C. Paclibar; Khryss T. Gayo |
| Staff writers | List of contributors: Keinzel Lenn Cercana; Erica Daprosa; Ronalyn Villas; Twinkle Joy Enilda; Mac Lennon Montano; Nathaniel Sena; Leslie Riego; Yhesa Pangilinan |

The Pioneer is DWCSJ's official school paper with a news and editorial board comprising 22 contributors and writers in current affairs, literary, sports and opinion pieces, holding its office inside Fr. McSherry gymnasium. It publishes yearly between June and November in tabloid format and is written in both English and Filipino. Standing in a Unified Voice as Witnesses to the Word. Its contributors also participate in division and regional campus journalism contests, winning second place in column writing qualifying for the national level and fourth place in newswriting at the 2018 Regional Schools Press Conference held in Tagaytay City in November of that year.

== Academic programs ==
Divine Word College of San Jose offers 11 undergraduate and 4 postgraduate degree programs since its inception as a Higher Education Institution (HEI). The school offers tertiary programs in the fields of Business, Tourism, Information Technology, and Arts and Sciences. Starting school year 2018-2019, Bachelor of Science in Civil Engineering was added to its roster of degree course offerings. Accreditation to operate basic education level from preparatory to senior high school were likewise granted by the government.

=== Postgraduate ===
The school was granted full autonomy to operate Master of Business Administration and Master of Arts in Education by the government in 1993 and 1995 respectively, independent of Divine Word College of Calapan. The school also offers a doctorate degree in Philosophy as an extension of Divine Word College of Calapan (DWCC) Graduate School.

| Graduate Course | Title | Focus Areas | Founded | Dean | Ref. | Notes |
|---|---|---|---|---|---|---|
| Master in Business Administration (Thesis and Non-thesis Program) | M.B.A. | | 1993 | Rev. Fr. Joel Sagdullas SVD; Prof. Maybelle Paulino (Acting Dean of Graduate School) | | (Note: By authority granted through G.R. No. R028, s. 1993) |
| Master of Arts in Education | M.A.Ed. | | 1995 | Rev. Fr. Joel Sagdullas SVD; Prof. Maybelle Paulino (Acting Dean of Graduate School) | | (Note: By authority granted through G.R. No. R011, s. 1995) |
| Master of Arts in Education | M.A. | Major in Administration and Supervision | 1995 | Rev. Fr. Joel Sagdullas SVD; Prof. Maybelle Paulino (Acting Dean of Graduate School) | | (Note: By authority granted through G.R. No. R011, s. 1995) |
| Master of Arts in Education | M.S.Ed. | Major in Science Education | 1995 | Rev. Fr. Joel Sagdullas SVD; Prof. Maybelle Paulino (Acting Dean of Graduate School) | | (Note: By authority granted through G.R. No. R011, s. 1995) |
| Doctor of Philosophy | Ph.D. | Major in Educational Management | 1997 | Dr. Corazon S. Morilla PhD | | (Note: By virtue of Government Recognition Nos. 27 and 28, s. 1997) (Note: Through Divine Word College of Calapan Graduate School Extension Program) |

=== Undergraduate ===
The Bachelor of Science in Civil Engineering is offered through an extension program by Divine Word College of Calapan Department of Engineering. The school also offers a non-diploma program for foreign language studies through its International Language Center, including several European (Spanish, French, Italian) and Asian (Mandarin Chinese) language courses that started in 2016.

| Faculty | Degree Course | Title | Focus Areas | Founded | Dean | Notes |
|---|---|---|---|---|---|---|
| (floating status) | Bachelor of Arts in English | AB English | English | 1965 | | (Note: By virtue of G.R. No. 232, s. 1965) |
| (floating status) | Bachelor of Arts in Communication | AB Comm | Communication | 2003 | | (Note: By virtue of G.R. No. 006, s. 2003) |
| College of Accountancy | Bachelor of Science in Accountancy | BSA | | 1993 | Clavelita C. Araneta CPA | (Note: By virtue of G.R. No. 012, s. 1993) |
| College of Accountancy | Bachelor of Science in Accounting Technology | BSAcT | | | Clavelita C. Araneta CPA | |
| College of Accountancy | Bachelor of Science in Accounting Information System | BSAIS | | | Clavelita C. Araneta CPA | |
| College of Business and Hospitality Management | Bachelor of Science in Business Administration | BSBA | Major in Financial Management | 1967 | Rev. Fr. Renato A. Tampol SVD | (Note: By virtue of G.R. No. 298, s. 1967) |
| College of Business and Hospitality Management | Bachelor of Science in Hotel and Restaurant Management | BSHRM | Hospitality Management | 2003 | Rev. Fr. Renato A. Tampol SVD | (Note: By virtue of G.R. No. 013, s. 2003) |
| College of Business and Hospitality Management | Bachelor of Science in Tourism | BST | Tourism Management | 2003 | Rev. Fr. Renato A. Tampol SVD | (Note: By virtue of G.R. No. 012, s. 2003) |
| College of Education and Information Technology | Bachelor of Science in Computer Science | BSCS | | 2001 | Dr. Jason S. Valera PhD | (Note: By virtue of G.R. No. 036, s. 2001) |
| College of Education and Information Technology | Bachelor of Science in Information Technology | BSIT | Specialization in Multimedia System | 1997 | Dr. Jason S. Valera PhD | (Note: By virtue of G.R. No. 064, s. 1997) |
| College of Education and Information Technology | Bachelor of Science in Information Technology | BSIT | Specialization in Animation and Game Development | 1997 | Dr. Jason S. Valera PhD | (Note: By virtue of G.R. No. 064, s. 1997) |
| College of Education and Information Technology | Bachelor of Secondary Education | BSEd | English | 1965 | Dr. Jason S. Valera PhD | (Note: By virtue of G.R. No. 232, s. 1965) |
| College of Education and Information Technology | Bachelor of Secondary Education | BSEd | Mathematics | 1965 | Dr. Jason S. Valera PhD | (Note: By virtue of G.R. No. 232, s. 1965) |
| College of Education and Information Technology | Bachelor of Secondary Education | BSEd | Filipino | 1965 | Dr. Jason S. Valera PhD | (Note: By virtue of G.R. No. 232, s. 1965) |
| College of Education and Information Technology | Bachelor of Secondary Education | BSEd | General Science | 1965 | Dr. Jason S. Valera PhD | (Note: By virtue of G.R. No. 232, s. 1965) |
| College of Education and Information Technology | Bachelor of Elementary Education | BEEd | | 1967 | Dr. Jason S. Valera PhD | (Note: By virtue of G.R. No. 0299, s. 1967) |
| Department of Engineering and Computer Studies | Bachelor of Science in Civil Engineering | BSCE | | 1991 | Engr. Roilynn R. Balbin | (Note: By virtue of G.R. No. 015, s. 1991) (Note: Through Divine Word College of Calapan Civil Engineering Extension Program) |

=== Basic education ===
In addition to undergraduate and graduate programs, the school also has a senior high school program with Technical-Vocational-Livelihood (TVL) and Academic strands or tracks as part of the implementation of the K to 12 program of the Department of Education (DepEd). A robotics course was offered to Junior High School starting October 2019 in partnership with Quezon City-based educational company TechFactors Inc.'s RoboTek program under JHS-Robotict Club.

==== Senior High School ====
The Divine Word College of San Jose is accredited by the Department of Education to operate Senior High School through program offerings in five (5) learning strands. This course serves as a preparatory and assessment level to help students choose the right course in college base on their capabilities.

| Track | Strand | Specialization | Grade | Principal |
|---|---|---|---|---|
| Academic | Accountancy, Business and Management (ABM) | | 11 - 12 | Dr. Chona T. Jarabata PhD |
| Academic | General Academic Strand (GAS) | | 11 - 12 | Dr. Chona T. Jarabata PhD |
| Academic | Humanities and Social Sciences (HUMSS) | | 11 - 12 | Dr. Chona T. Jarabata PhD |
| Academic | Science, Technology, Engineering and Mathematics (STEM) | | 11 - 12 | Dr. Chona T. Jarabata PhD |
| Technical-Vocational-Livelihood (TVL) | Home Economics (HE) | Bread and Pastry Production and Food and Beverage Services | 11 - 12 | Dr. Chona T. Jarabata PhD |
| Technical-Vocational-Livelihood (TVL) | Home Economics (HE) | Tour Guiding Services | 11 - 12 | Dr. Chona T. Jarabata PhD |
| Technical-Vocational-Livelihood (TVL) | Information and Communications Technology (ICT) | Computer Programming | 11 - 12 | Dr. Chona T. Jarabata PhD |

==== Junior High School, Grade School, and Child Development Center ====
The secondary education level started as early as 1945 with the establishment of Southern Mindoro Academy as the school's predecessor, with a few freshmen and sophomore students. With the implementation of the K to 12 program in 2016, the secondary education was split into upper secondary level comprising the Senior High School, and the lower secondary level comprising the Junior High School level. The elementary level was introduced in 1985; likewise, the pre-school level was introduced through the Child Development Center in 1995.

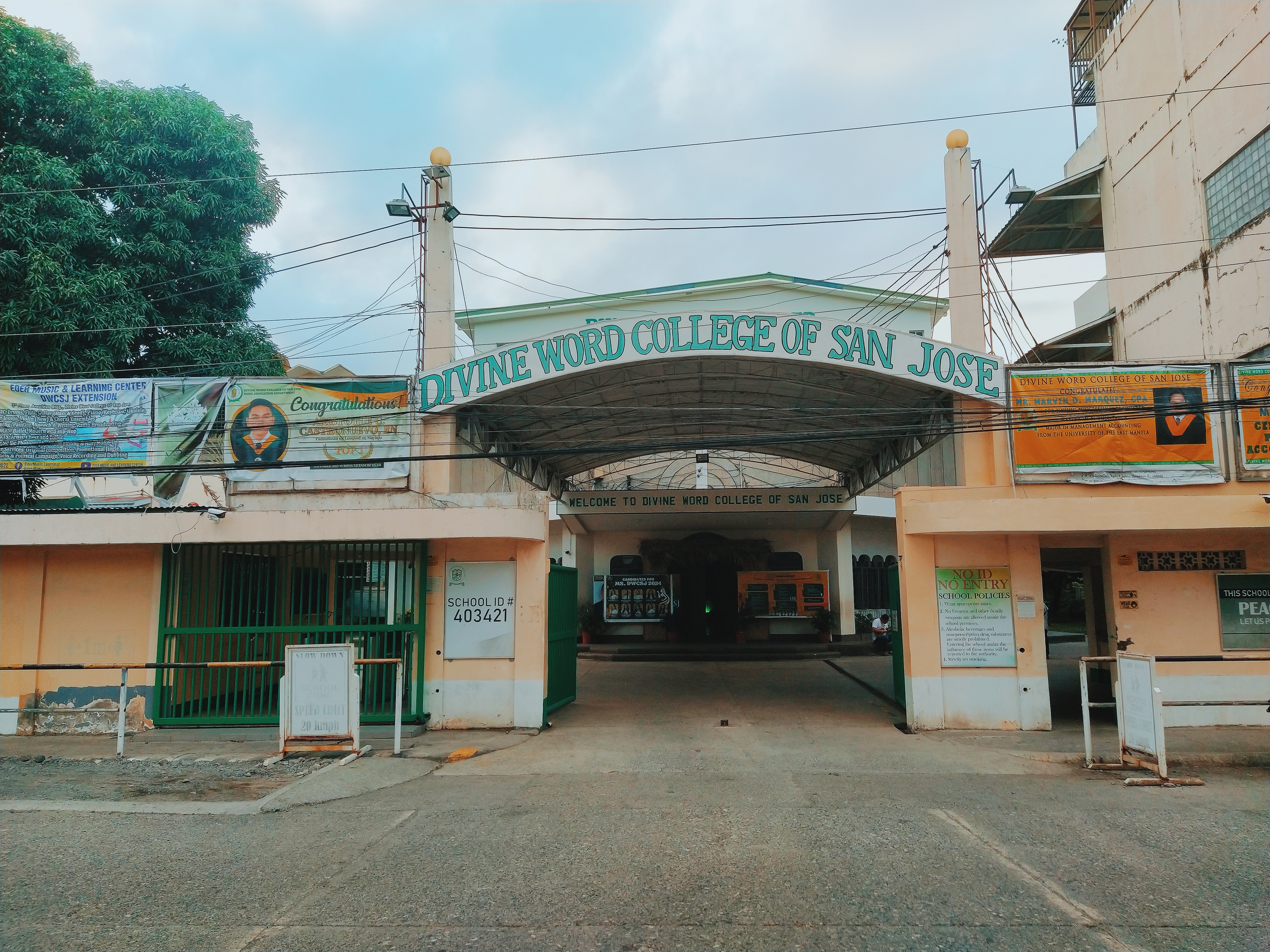
Main eastern gate facing General Lukban Street, captured in February 2024

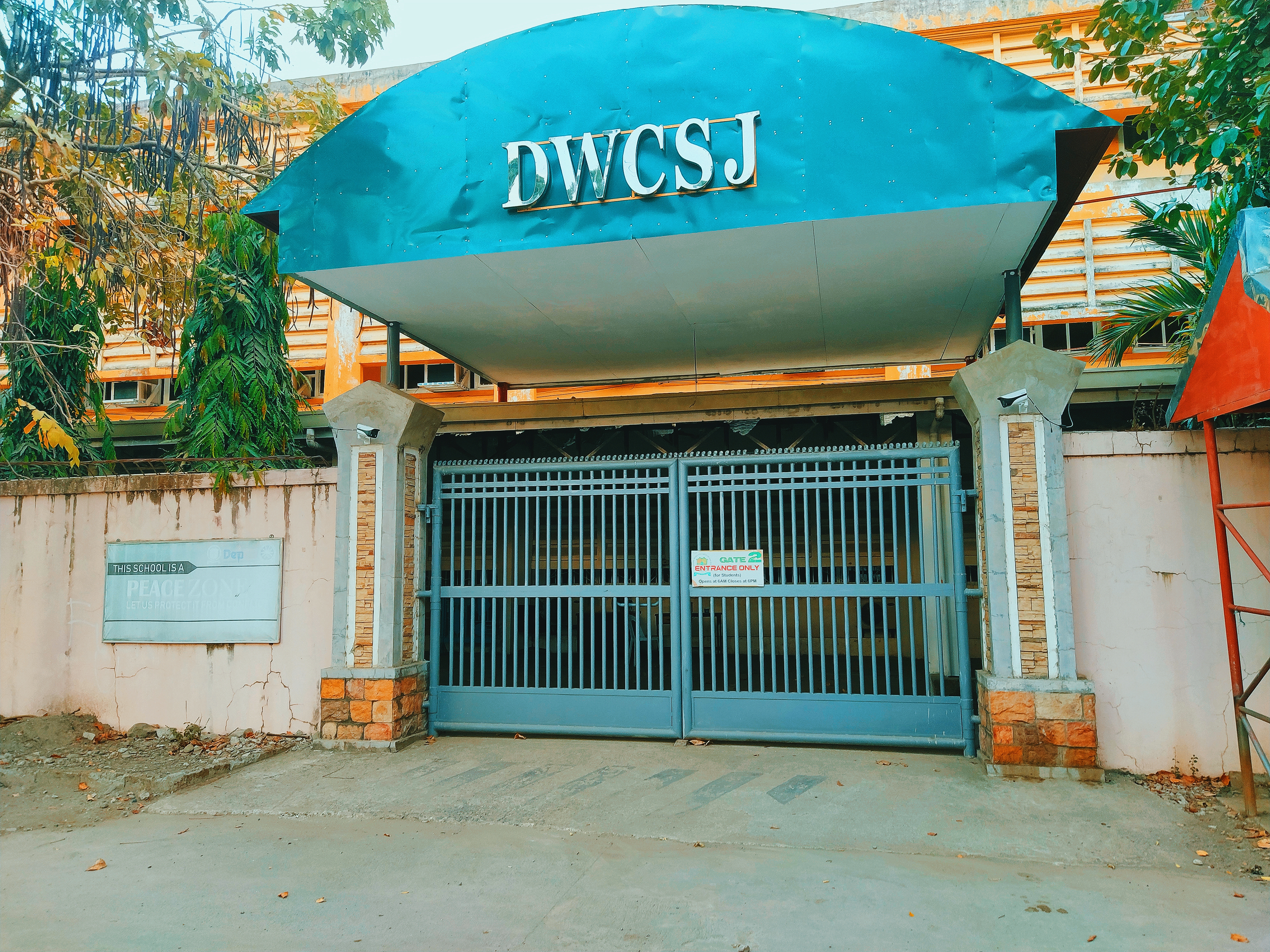
Secondary western gate facing Roxas Street, captured in February 2024

| Level | Grade | Principal | Founded | Note |
|---|---|---|---|---|
| Junior High School (with Computer Literacy program) | 7 - 10 | Ms. Glorietta O. Mendoza | 2016 | |
| Grade School (with Computer Literacy program) | 1 - 6 | Mr. Jason S. Valera PhD | 1985 | (Note: By authority of G.R. No. 091, s. 1985) |
| Pre-school (Child Development Center) | Preparatory | Mrs. Margie Ann M. Dela Torre; Mrs. Teodora C. Mangilaya | 1995 | |
| Pre-school (Child Development Center) | Kindergarten | Mrs. Margie Ann M. Dela Torre; Mrs. Teodora C. Mangilaya | 1995 | |
| Pre-school (Child Development Center) | Nursery | Mrs. Margie Ann M. Dela Torre; Mrs. Teodora C. Mangilaya | 1995 | |

=== Mangyan Education Program ===
The Mangyan Education Program is the Community Extension Project of the Divine Word College of San Jose which aims to educate and give livelihood to the indigenous peoples of the province, namely the various Mangyan tribes living on the rural and mountainous areas. The school collaborated with the Local Government Unit (LGU) and the Far Eastern University and has sent 47 students to study at the main campus through the Community Extension Services Office. These students are housed at the Mangyan Education Center in Arnoldus Village and are being trained for livelihood and culture preservation. Some out-of-school Mangyans of different ages living in far-flung regions of Sitio Bamban and Paclolo are taught at the basic education level using modular approach through the Indigenous Learning System, a type of Alternative Learning System (ALS). The program is headed by its director, Bro. Vincent Iopam SVD hailing from Vanuatu.

== College symbols and traditions ==
=== Official Seal ===
Coat of arms of the Divine Word College of San Jose
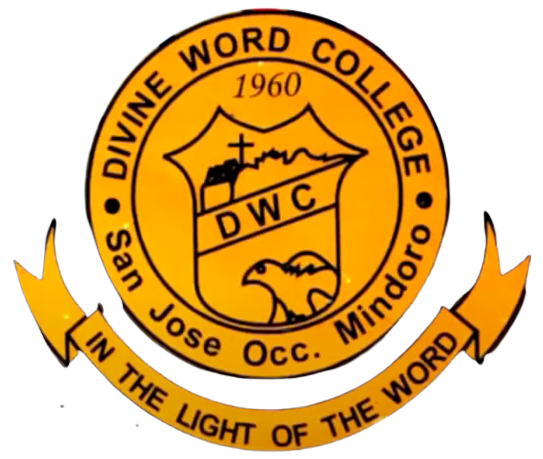
- Armiger: Divine Word College of San Jose
- Adopted: 1960
- Shield: Tierced bendwise a dexter chief studded with mountain impaled with the Holy Cross, in sinister charged with an eagle of John the Evangelist below a bend sinister inscribed three Latin alphabets DWC
- Compartment: Beneath a scroll inscribed thereon the school's former motto
- Motto: In the Light of the Word

The Seal of the Divine Word College of San Jose is the official instrument used by the school as its official symbol and identity, and to certify its legal public documents and publications. The seal used when the school was originally established as Southern Mindoro Academy in 1945 features a map of Mindoro island over a white backdrop, enclosed by a circular white band with inner and outer black rings in which the then school abbreviation (SMA), its founding year (1945), and the name of the town of San Jose were inscribed.

When the academy was handed over to the Society of the Divine Word in 1960, the school adopted religious iconography, such as the cross over a mountain which symbolizes the Catholic faith in Occidental Mindoro, and an eagle which symbolically represents St. John the Evangelist from whom the school was named. In the middle was a bend sinister dividing the shield in halves and bearing the school's acronym, DWC, which stands for Divine Word College. Over time, the seal was restyled to include a banderole emblazoned with the institution's original motto, "In the Light of the Word", derived from a passage in the Gospel of John.

Its latest iteration features a wedge-top escutcheon divided into four quadrants. In addition to the religious symbols, the seal now incorporates a Tamaraw on the first quarter (a bovine endemic to Mindoro island) and the logo of the Society of the Divine Word below it on the third quadrant. This version retained the founding years 1945 and 1960 rendered in the original golden tincture to signify the transfer of ownership and change in leadership. Encircling the emblem is the school's complete name and location rendered in slab serif typeface. Superimposed in the middle of the shield is the college nickname, DWCSJ, which now includes "SJ" as the initials for San Jose to distinguish it from other SVD schools in the country. The motto was also changed to its present form, "Witness to the Word".

==== School colors ====
Orange and green are the official school colors

The college's official main colors are Orange and Green , primarily used to represent the school's brand identity in publications and athletic events and were seen directly on the official seal. The colors are rendered in the following color schemes:

| Scheme | Orange | Green | Yellow (Note: Used as secondary color and was the main color of the old logo; also used in graduation garb of accountancy graduates) |
|---|---|---|---|
| RGB | 238-134-12 | 0-146-74 | 226-167-11 |
| CMYK | C0-M41-Y89-K7 | C57-M0-Y28-K43 | C0-M26-Y95-K11 |
| HEX | #EE860C | #00924A | #E2A70B |

=== DWCSJ Hymn ===
External videos
- DWCSJ Hymn
- Official alma mater song on YouTube. Written by Rev. Fr. Erasio Flores SVD. Official lyrics by Demetrio Maglalang

DWCSJ Hymn

"We saw thy gleaming glory shine
From out the isles and mountain clod
We hear thy voice, Oh word Divine
We come, Oh Pioneer of God!

Refrain
Rise, sons and daughters, sons of day
Raise high your voices, noble and free
Oh sing the praises, sing the lay
Oh sing the name DWC!

We seek the wisdom of the Word
Like pilgrims lost in aliens sod
Unsheathe for us life's conquering sword
For us, Oh Pioneer of God!

(Repeat Refrain)

Thou standst the fount of age-old lore
God's citadel through rain and flood
Thy name by land and far-flung shore
Resounds, Oh Pioneer of God!"

(Repeat Refrain)

— Demetrio M. Maglalang, c. 1970s

Divine Word College of San Jose Hymn is the college's official alma mater song. The lyrics were written by Demetrio Maglalang, an alumnus of the college who emigrated to Indianapolis, Indiana, United States, in the 1970s. The melody for the song was composed by Rev. Fr. Erasio Flores SVD, former assistant director of the school and Major Superior for SVD Philippine Central (PHC) region in Mindoro during the late 1970s.

=== Divine Got Talent and other activities ===
The Divine Word College of San Jose hosts a variety of school activities and events, mainly to commemorate the college's founding anniversary as a pioneering educational institution in the province and to celebrate its Christian teachings deeply influenced by its Filipino SVD culture. Some of the activities are annual events, such as religious celebrations like the Feast of the Immaculate Conception and the Holy Eucharist every first Wednesday of the month to mark the start and end of the academic year, orientation and acquaintance programs for freshmen and new students, annual talents exhibitions, and intercollegiate sporting competitions.

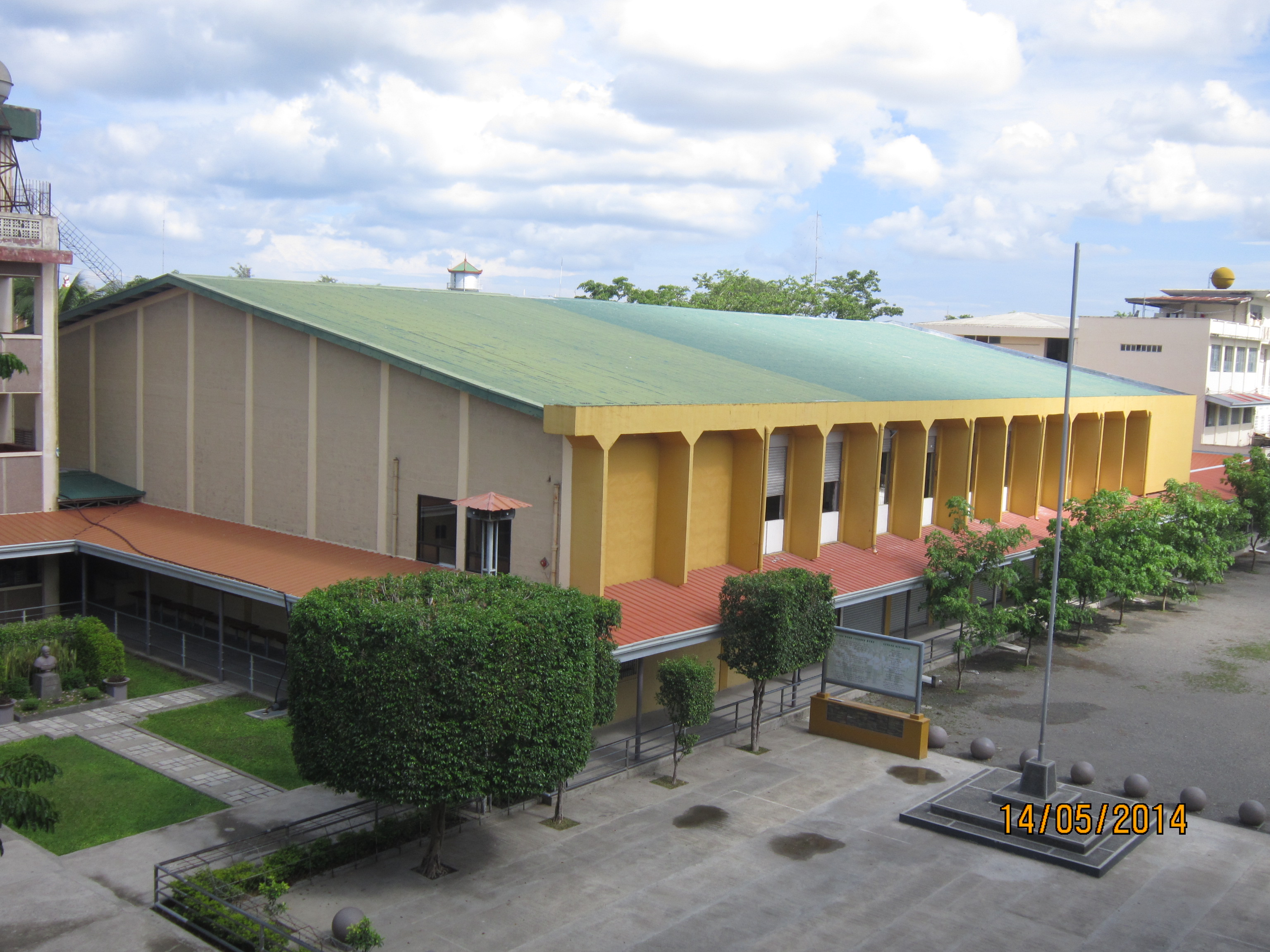
Rear view of Fr. McSherry Gymnasium in 2014 as seen from Arnoldus Building

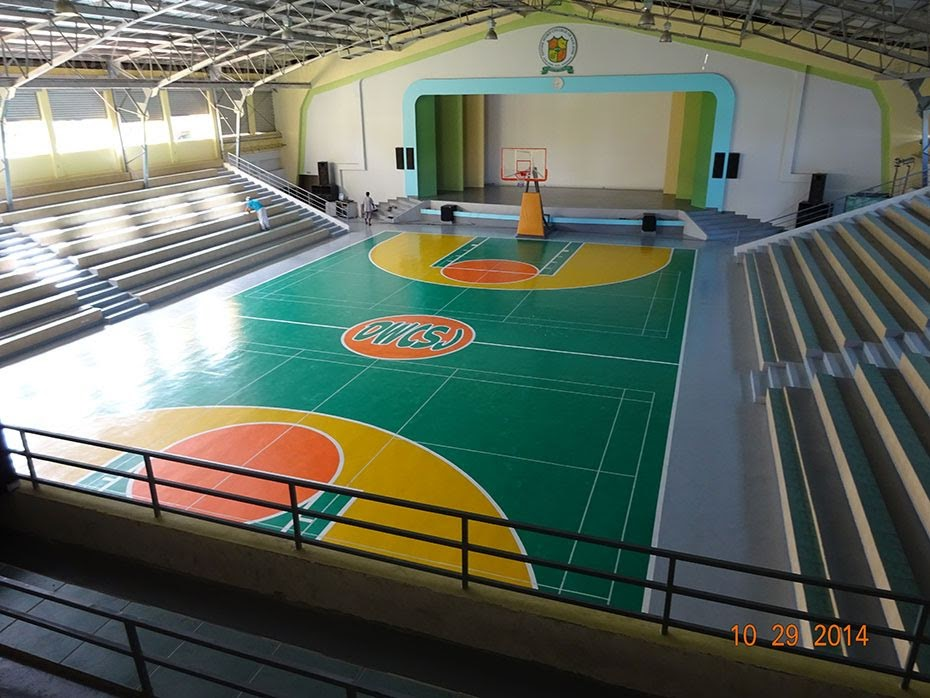
Inside the retroffited school gym where most indoor athletic sports and stage events are held

The school hosts the yearly Divine Got Talent (DGT) talent exhibition to showcase the students' talents in different fields such as singing, dancing, acting, and beauty pageantry. Started in 2017, it is a spin-off of the popular Got Talent global talent show franchise. Every students from basic education to tertiary level are encouraged to join the competition. The event is usually held during the first week of February to mark the college's founding anniversary. (Note: Although the school was originally established as Southern Mindoro Academy on August 8, 1945, it celebrates its founding anniversary annually in February, the time when the academy was ceded to the Society of the Divine Word in 1960) Winners in different competition categories are given prizes and trophies.

The Gabi ng Parangal is an annual service awards given to outstanding employees, students and alumni for their exemplary leadership, dedication and service to the school. The event coincides with the founding anniversary held during the first week of February. The event confers awards and special citations to candidates of various sectors and categories, such as the Ten Outstanding Students, Service Awardees for Years of Service, Special Award for Punctuality, and Loyalty Awards.

The college also joins the annual Alay Lakad together with other schools, government institutions, non-governmental organizations and other delegations from various sectors. Initiated by the Local Government Unit (LGU), it is a nationwide "walk for a cause" campaign that aims to raise funds for the out-of-school youth and provide scholarship grants to deserving but marginalized students. The fundraising campaign was started in 1972 by Alay Lakad Foundation, Inc. and has since been observed by various sectors around the country. The walkathon culminates with the awarding of Mr. and Ms. Alay Lakad and other special awards.

Divine Word College of San Jose also participates in several intercollegiate athletics tournaments such as the Private Schools Athletic Association (PRISAA) and the Inter-Catholic Schools Sports and Academic Meet (ICSSAM). The school hosted the 2018 Regional PRISAA Meet in March of that year. Aside from these, the school also holds its own college intramural sports every September led by the Sports Club Committee to celebrate team spirit and sportsmanship.

=== Campus life ===
==== Student enrollment ====
Enrollment in DWCSJ (First & second terms)
| Academic year | Total Enrollment | College Population |
|---|---|---|
| 2016–2017 | 2,674 | 1,190 |
| 2017–2018 | 2,441 | 857 |
| 2018–2019 | – | 688 |
| ±% p.a. | ▼ −0.013% | ▼ −14.06% |
Note: Per annum growth rate or PGR (Population Growth Rate) was computed using the formula PG = ((t_{1}−t_{0}))/t_{0} × 100, where t_{0} indicates initial population, t_{1} means latest population, and PG refer to Population Growth. PG was then divided to 3 (number of years) to get the PGR

The school experienced a decline in overall student enrollees between the Academic Years 2016–2017 and 2017–2018 from 2,674 on the first half of 2016 down to 2,441 on the latter half of 2017, per report from the Education Apostolate of SVD Philippine Central Province chapter. That same period saw a significant drop in the population of college students from 1,190 in 2016 down to 857 by the end of 2018, with a faculty-to-student ratio of one instructor for every 33 students down to 1 per 27 the following year. The downturn in college population continued as the tertiary level department reported a 7.53% drop in enrollment when compared to previous years, dwindling to just 688 college enrollees for AY 2018–2019 based on data from the Office of the School Registrar.

The school also implements an online enrollment system through a proprietary learning and academic management software by the company Digital Software Corporation, called the SIAS Online System, which can also be utilized to access class schedules, grading rubrics, attendance and statements of account. Registration for incoming fresh enrollees require documents such as the previous report card, PSA-issued birth certificate and transcript of records. Admission is open to any nationality and non-Catholics though everyone is required to attend religion classes and Mass celebrations.

==== Campus ====
Buildings in Divine Word College of San Jose

| 1 | Chapel of St. Arnold |
| 2 | Arnoldus Building |
| 3 | Fr. McSherry Gymnasium |
| 4 | College building |

| 5 | College library |
| 6 | Cafeteria |
| 7 | Auditorium |
| 8 | Student lounge |

The school occupies a central location within the poblacion area of San Jose, in the jurisdiction of Barangay 8. It sits on an approximately 3.91-acre (1.58 ha) block of rectangular plot of land southeast of the Pandurucan River in close proximity to downtown activity centers such as the San Jose Tennis Court, St. Joseph the Worker Cathedral and the municipal plaza, and is bounded by Hidalgo Street to the north, General Lukban Street to the east, Roxas Street to the west and Mabini Street to the south.

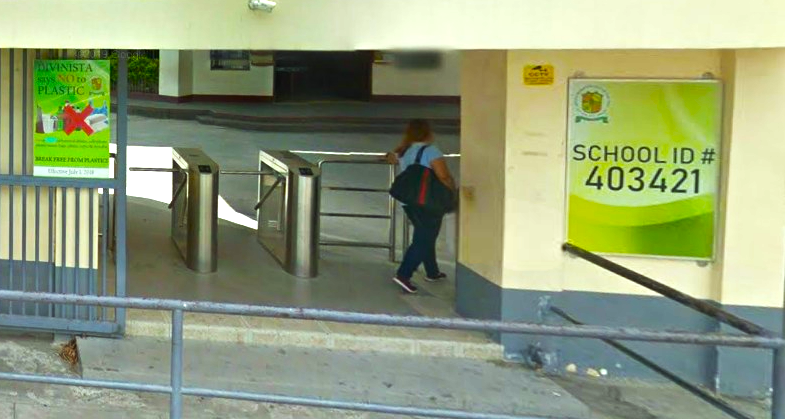
Main automated turnstile entrance gates accessible via smart ID card, installed in 2019

Its original site in 1945 when it was formed as a secular high school was at a large quonset building bought by the founders of SMA in the old town of Barangay Central. It then transferred to its present urban location formerly owned by the prominent family of Soldevillas a year after the construction of McGuire Field in 1946. Several new additions to the facilities were added over the years of its growth, such as the recently renovated fully-airconditioned gymnasium, a state-of-the-art auditorium with a 250-seating capacity, student lounge, mock hotel and cafe, and automated entrance turnstiles accessible through the contactless student ID. Students and faculty can purchase items from the school canteen through cashless POS payments using their reloadable ID card which can be topped up at loading stations near the school bookstore.

== See also ==
- List of SVD schools

== Works cited ==
- Diosay, Rica Mae S.; et al. (June–November 2018). Laab, Leonila D. (ed.). "The Pioneer". Vol. 28, no. 1. San Jose, Occidental Mindoro: DWCSJ Publishing – via Issuu.
- Eberhard, Franz; et al. (May 18, 2020). Taylor, Ann C.; IAU (eds.). International Handbook of Universities and other Institutions of Higher Education. Vol. 11 (11 ed.). De Gruyter. ISBN 9783112322543. OCLC 1158171753.
- Esquejo, Kristoffer R. (October 11, 2012). Manalastas, Eric (ed.). "Gabriel F. Fabella: Talambuhay at Pamana ng Tinaguriang 'Ama ng Hunyo 12', 1898-1982". Philippine Social Sciences Review (in Filipino). 63 (2). ISSN 0117-1828. OCLC 939087220.
- Fabella, Gabriel Fabrero (September 9, 2008). Gabriel F. Fabella: The Man from Romblon, Autobiography. University of Michigan Press. OCLC 40137872.
- Iopam, Willy Vincent (2015). "Br Vincent, using his IT skills for God's glory in the Philippines" (PDF). Society Matters. 25 (1). SVD Australian Province. OCLC 221163483. Archived from the original (PDF) on December 25, 2018.
- Landicho, Macario Z. (July 17, 2006). The Mindoro Yearbook. University of Michigan Press. OCLC 3979404.
- Javines, Felino B. Jr (March 2009). "The Rebirth of DWU-T in Liceo Del Verbo Divino". Lumina. 20 (1). Holy Name University. ISSN 2094-1188. OCLC 701805939.
- Cordero, Crispin A. (2002). "The Financial Management System of the Divine Word Colleges of Northern Luzon". Saint Louis University Research Journal (13): 57. ISSN 0036-3014.
- Ocampo, Hanna Joy M. (April 28, 2022). Gorospe, Joanne D. (ed.). "E-Learning Related Attitudes, English Language Learning Strategies, And Academic Performance In English of Grade 9 Students of Divine Word College of San Jose". International Journal of Educational Research & Social Sciences. 3 (2). doi:10.51601/ijersc.v3i2.330 (inactive July 12, 2025). ISSN 2774-5406. Archived from the original on November 22, 2023.
- Candelario, Rudy A. (2019). "Glimpses in the History of Occidental Mindoro" (PDF). The PASCHR Journal. 2 (2). Philippine Association for the Study of Culture, History and Religion Inc. ISSN 2718-9155.
- Candelario, Rudy A. (2015). "History of the Town of San Jose". Archived from the original on November 22, 2018.
- Candelario, Rudy A. (2000). Maikling Kasaysayan ng Occidental Mindoro [Brief History of Occidental Mindoro] (in Filipino). Vol. 2. Occidental Mindoro Historical Society. Fil DS68.02.
