= International Journal of Educational Research =

Academic journal

- Discipline: Education
- Language: English
- Edited by: Wilfried F. Admiraal and Stuart Woodcock

Publication details
- Former names: Evaluation in Education: International Progress; Evaluation in Education
- History: 1977–present
- Publisher: Elsevier
- Impact factor: 4.334 (2025)

Standard abbreviations
- ISO 4: Int. J. Educ. Res.

Indexing
- CODEN: EIRSD6
- ISSN: 0883-0355 (print); 1873-538X (web)
- LCCN: 86648662
- OCLC no.: 231030487

Links
- Journal homepage; Online access; Online archive

The International Journal of Educational Research is an international peer-reviewed academic journal covering educational research. It was established in 1977 as Evaluation in Education: International Progress, and it was renamed Evaluation in Education in 1979. It obtained its current title in 1986. It is published by Elsevier and the Editors-in-Chief are Wilfried F. Admiraal (Oslo Metropolitan University) and Stuart Woodcock (Edith Cowan University). According to the Journal Citation Reports, the journal impact factor is 3.2.
