= Hyacinth Gabriel Connon =

Lasallian Brother

Brother Hyacinth Gabriel Connon FSC

President of De La Salle University
- Second term 1966–1978
- Preceded by: Crescentius Richard FSC
- Succeeded by: Andrew Gonzalez FSC
- First term 1950–1959
- Preceded by: Andelino Manuel FSC
- Succeeded by: Denis of Mary FSC

Personal details
- Born: Patrick B. Connon; July 11, 1911 Chicago, Illinois
- Died: August 24, 1978 (aged 67) Manila, Philippines

Brother Hyacinth Gabriel Connon FSC (July 11, 1911 – August 24, 1978), was a Lasallian Brother and president of De La Salle University in Manila from 1950 to 1959 and 1966 to 1978. He is the second president to have served two terms in the history of the university, the first being Brother Acisclus Michael.

The greatest achievement ever made during Connon's administration was the granting of the charter as a university to the college on February 19, 1975.

== Early life and education ==
Connon was born on July 11, 1911 in Chicago. He was ordained a brother through the St. Louis district of the Brothers of Christian Schools- Connon received the habit of a Brother on August 30, 1928 at the Brothers' novitiate in Glencoe, Missouri.

== President of De La Salle University ==
=== First term (1950–1959) ===
Connon's first term was marked by the expansion of the college and its professionalization, began under Brother Chrysostom Peter Clifford, who assumed the post of dean of the college, succeeding Brother Lambert Edward Chisholm, its post-war re-founder. It was also during this first period of the presidency that Connon assumed the directorship of the community, the presidency of the college, and the auxiliary visitorship of the Philippines in 1953, the Philippines having been raised to be a sub-district of the San Francisco Province of the Brothers.

As auxiliary visitor, Connon, using De La Salle College as a base and as the mother institution, opened the novitiate in Baguio in 1951, the scholasticate on Taft Avenue in 1960, and the junior novitiate (also on Taft Avenue) in 1959.

In addition, Connon opened La Salle College Bacolod, La Salle Greenhills, La Salle Iligan, and La Salle Lipa. Within De La Salle College, the growing autonomy of the college as a separate unit was symbolized by the construction of Saint Joseph Hall.

=== Second term (1966–1978) ===
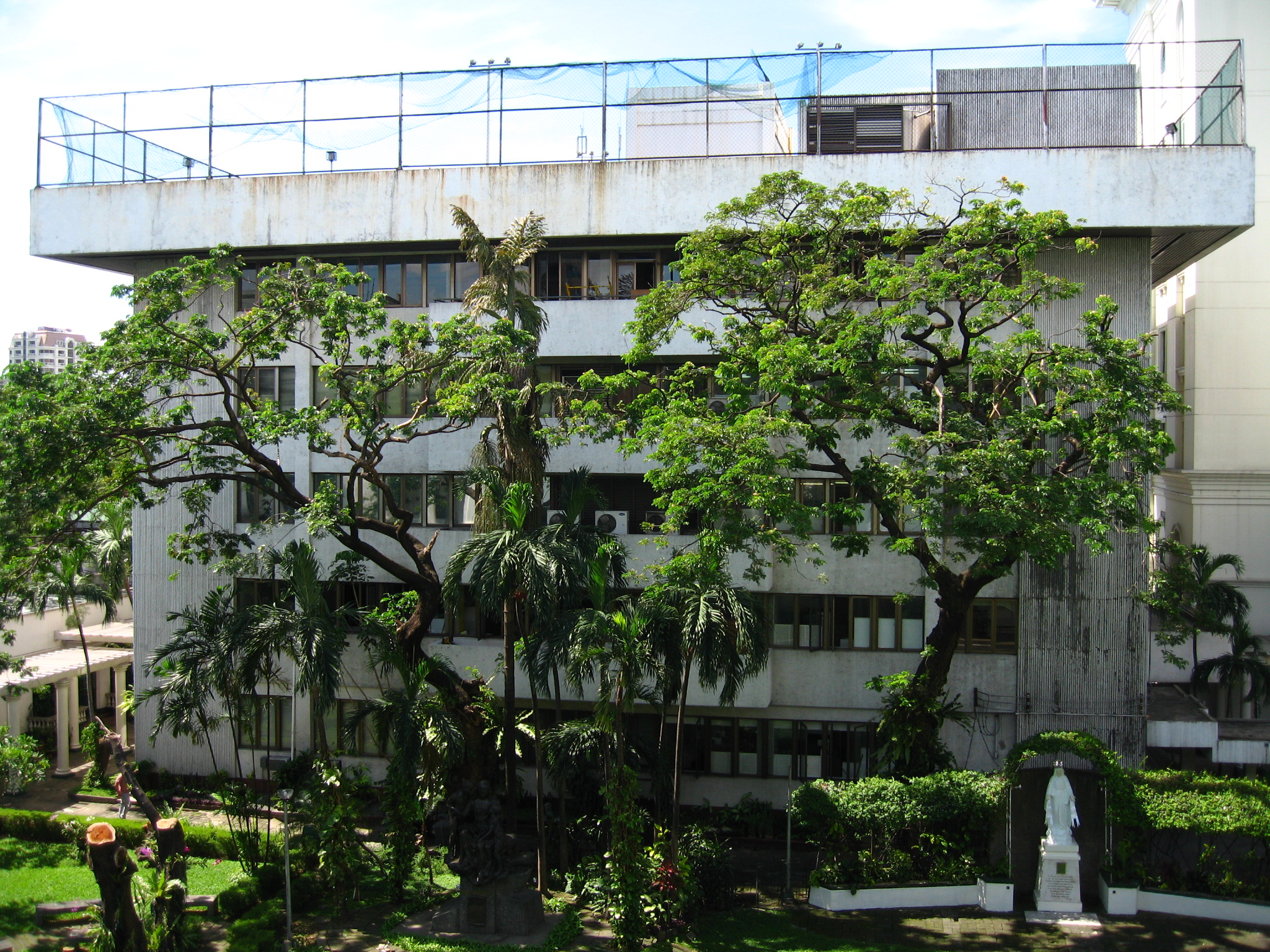
Br. Connon Hall

It was during Connon's second term that the position of director (superior) of the Brothers' Community was separated from the presidency of the college. Connon as president oversaw the expansion of the college from an enrollment of 1,500 to more than 5,000 and the expansion of its units. Benilde Hall (now St. Miguel Hall) was constructed and the plans for the Student Services Building (named Br. Connon Hall in his memory) was finalized. It was also during his second term that De La Salle College was granted university status. By that time, he had an investiture celebration as De La Salle University's first Filipino president, having been granted Filipino citizenship by an act of Congress on August 10, 1970.

== Other achievements ==
In the 1950s, Connon was involved in the establishment of the Catholic Educational Association of the Philippines, and became its president in 1952. He resigned the post in 1957 for health reasons. Bro. Connon started the project as CEAP president to create a set of standards for schools, which later became the PAASCU system in 1957.

In the 1960s, Connon, in tandem with the rector of the Ateneo de Manila University at that time, worked for the founding of the Asian Institute of Management, a graduate school of business for Southeast Asia.

== Honorary degrees ==
- Doctor of Letters (1950)—St. Mary’s College: Moraga, California
- Doctor of Philosophy (1961)—Ateneo de Manila University: Quezon City, the Philippines
- Doctor of Philosophy (1961)—San Beda College: Manila, the Philippines

Academic offices
| Preceded by Bro. Lucian Athanasius, F.S.C. Br. Andelino Manuel FSC; Acting President (1950) | President of De La Salle College; 1950-1959 | Succeeded by Bro. Denis of Mary, F.S.C. |
| Preceded by Bro. Crescentius Richard, F.S.C. | President of De La Salle University; 1966-1978 | Succeeded by Bro. Andrew Gonzalez, F.S.C. |
