= Fund for Assistance to Private Education =

- Logo of the trust fund committee
- Abbreviation: FAPE
- Formation: November 5, 1968; 57 years ago
- Type: Scholarship fund
- Legal status: EO № 150 s. 1968
- Purpose: Provide financial assistance to students from independent schools
- Headquarters: 25F Philippine AXA Life Centre, Gil Puyat Avenue, Makati City, Metro Manila 1286 Philippines
- Region served: Philippines
- Chairman: Sonny Angara (Secretary of Education)
- Board of directors: Representatives of: NEDA; CEAP; ACSCU; PACU
- Main organ: Private Education Assistance Committee (PEAC)
- Parent organization: Department of Education (DepEd)
- Website: peac.org.ph

The Fund for Assistance to Private Education (FAPE) is a perpetual trust fund for private education created by Executive Order No. 156 s. 1968 and amended by Executive Order No. 150 s. 1994.

FAPE was created on November 5, 1968, by Executive Order No. 156, in implementation of the project agreement between the Philippine and United States governments to establish a permanent trust fund that would address the needs of the private education sector in the country.

In the 1960s, the Coordinating Council of Private Educational Associations (COCOPEA) campaigned for a share in the Special Education Fund, which was from the surplus funds authorized by the War Damage Act of 1965. The private education sector successfully convinced the Philippine government that it has an important role to play in nation-building such that it not only deserved but also needed to be assisted financially.

The trustee of FAPE is the Private Education Assistance Committee (PEAC), which is headed by the Secretary of Education as its chairman. PEAC is also composed of representatives from the National Economic and Development Authority (NEDA), Catholic Educational Association of the Philippines (CEAP); Association of Christian Schools, Colleges, and Universities (ACSCU) and the Philippine Association of Colleges and Universities (PACU).

Through the years, the management of the Fund has evolved to cover other programs of assistance to the private education sector and with it an organization that helps the PEAC. Recently renamed the PEAC National Secretariat (so as not to confuse with the trust fund), the organization, as directed by the PEAC, manages and develops programs of assistance to private education and participates in initiatives affecting the sector. Presently, it manages the Education Service Contracting, Teacher Salary Subsidy, and Senior High School Voucher Program components of the GASTPE Program of the Department of Education, the In-Service Training Program, and the Research Program, among others.
