= Catholic Educational Association of the Philippines =

Catholic schools association

- Abbreviation: CEAP
- Formation: February 2, 1941; 85 years ago
- Founder: Michael J. O'Doherty
- Legal status: Non-stock, non-profit organization
- Headquarters: No. 7 Road 16 Brgy. Bagong Pag-asa, Quezon City, Philippines
- Members: 1,525 (2026)
- President: Karel San Juan
- Website: ceap.org.ph

The Catholic Educational Association of the Philippines (CEAP) is a national association of Catholic educational institutions in the Philippines. It represents the interests of Catholic schools in national and international forums. The association has over 1,500 member institutions in all regions in the country and is headquartered in Quezon City.

== History ==
=== Formation ===
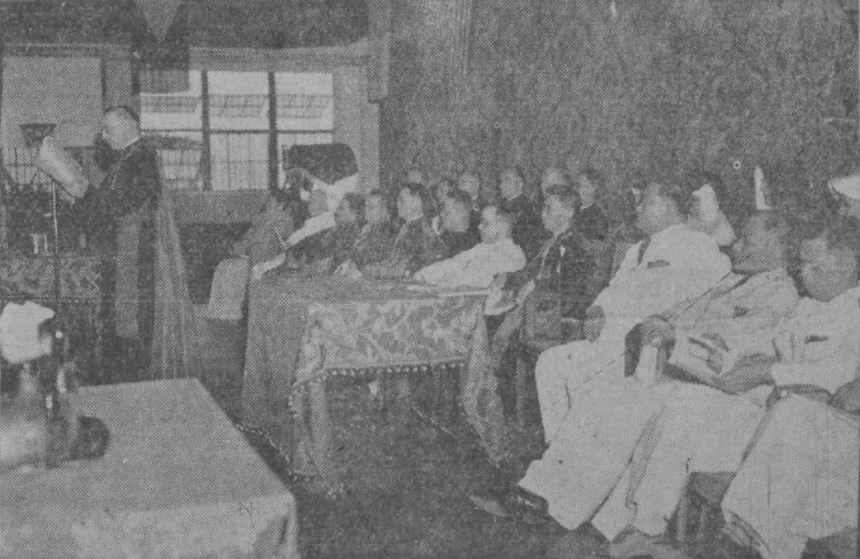
The first conference of CEAP, held in the University of Santo Tomas.

The Catholic Educational Association was formed on February 2, 1941, by the then-Archbishop of Manila, Michael J. O'Doherty, along with representatives from other schools who sought to better organize and raise the standards of Catholic schools in the Philippines during the time. The association convened for its first annual meeting on May 28, 1941, at the University of Santo Tomas. During their first year, CEAP has made multiple proposals to shorten the years of basic and higher education courses. In the same year, however, they ceased operations due to the outbreak of the Second World War.

=== Re-organization ===
Following the war in 1945, they reorganized and secured rehabilitation funding for private schools through the Catholic Welfare Organization and additional funding from the passing of Public Law 303 of the 82nd United States Congress.

Previous discussions with heads of various universities in the Philippines had taken place regarding the creation of a national voluntary accreditation system to deregulate schools from government control. In 1953, the then-president of CEAP, Hyacinth Gabriel Connon, wanted to revive the voluntary accreditation movement as previously attempted by the Philippine Accrediting Association of Universities and Colleges (PAAUC) to set higher educational standards than what was set by the Bureau of Education. CEAP was granted permission to use PAAUC's criteria, and the accreditation team used the criteria in 11 CEAP-affiliated colleges. These efforts led to the incorporation of the Philippine Accrediting Association of Schools, Colleges and Universities (PAASCU) on November 5, 1957.

== Organization and administration ==
=== Governance ===
==== Board of Trustees ====
CEAP is governed by a Board of Trustees that oversees the general interests of the association. The Board has 22 members and is composed of presidents and directors of member institutions, as well as superintendents of regional educational systems and associations. It is made up of five trustees-at-large, the chairperson of the superintendents' conference, and 17 regional trustees from each Philippine region that have member institutions in the association. Trustees-at-large are elected by school heads and superintendents during the association's annual national convention.

The current president is Karel San Juan.

==== Commissions ====
CEAP has six commissions that coordinate with its member institutions to support the missions of the association:

- National Christian Formation Commission
- National Basic Education Commission
- National Higher Education Commission
- National Advocacy Commission
- National Technical-Vocational Education Commission
- Philippine Catholic Schools Standards Commission

==== Committees ====
CEAP has five committees in charge of specific operational and governance responsibilities within the association:

- Membership and Awards Committee
- Finance and Personnel Committee
- Investment Committee
- Research Committee
- Legal Committee

==== National Secretariat ====
The National Secretariat, led by an executive director, handles the daily operations of the association.

==== Regional Chapters ====
Governance is localized through regional chapters that each have their own internal structure, with each chapter being represented by a designated regional trustee. The chapters coordinate local assemblies with CEAP member institutions of their respective regions and ensure that national directives from the Board are adapted to the specific cultural and economic context of that region.

=== Affiliations ===
CEAP is affiliated with the following organizations:

- Coordinating Council of Private Educational Associations (COCOPEA)
- Private Educational Assistance Committee-Fund for Assistance to Private Education (PEAC-FAPE)
- International Office of Catholic Education (OIEC)
- Catholic Bishops' Conference of the Philippines
- Department of Education
- Commission on Higher Education
- Second Congressional Commission on Education
- Technical Education and Skills Development Authority

== Events and programs ==
=== Athletics ===
CEAP holds national and regional sports competitions annually in the Philippines:

- CEAP Mindanao Games - an annual sports competition with participating institutions in all regions within Mindanao excluding ARMM (Zamboanga Peninsula, Northern Mindanao, Davao Region, SOCCSKSARGEN, and Caraga).
- CEAP Regional Games - a series of sports competitions held annually within each Philippine region that have CEAP member schools.

=== Educational frameworks ===
The JEEPGY program was developed by CEAP in 2009 to target six core pillars: Justice and Peace, Ecological Integrity, Engaged Citizenship, Poverty Alleviation, Gender Sensitivity, and Youth Empowerment. The program pushes for transformative education in the curricula of CEAP's member institutions.

== Political stance ==
CEAP in recent years has been involved in multiple political movements against "cha-cha" under assertions that it will only benefit a few Filipinos and is being pushed by corrupt political leaders.

Since the EDSA People Power Revolution in 1987, CEAP has been vocal and highly critical against the Marcos family. In 2011, they published a strongly worded statement against the burial of Ferdinand Marcos at the Libingan ng mga Bayani, labelling him as a "fake" hero. In 2016, the association opposed the actions of Bongbong Marcos' alleged attempts at historical revisionism, calling out his efforts to "canonize" Ferdinand Marcos' rule during martial law. In 2025, around 20 member institutions kept February 25 as a holiday against Bongbong Marcos' proclamation that it would be removed from the list of annual special holidays.
