= Divine Word College of Legazpi =

Roman Catholic college in Albay, Philippines

- Dalubhasaang Banal na Salita ng Legazpi (Filipino)
- DWCL seal
- Former names: Liceo de Albay (1947-1960); Divine Word High School (1961-1965)
- Motto: Duc in Altum (Latin)
- Motto in English: Put Out into the Deep
- Type: Private Catholic Non-profit Coeducational Basic and Higher education institution
- Established: 1947; 79 years ago
- Founder: Rev. Fr. Juan Carullo
- Religious affiliation: Roman Catholic (Divine Word Missionaries)
- Academic affiliations: DWEA; CEAP; PAASCU
- President: Rev. Fr. Renato A. Tampol, SVD, PhD
- Faculty: 98 (2019)
- Students: 2,138 (2019)
- Location: Corner J.P. Rizal and Fr. J.L. Bates St., Albay District, Legazpi City, Albay, Philippines; 13°08′17″N 123°44′08″E
- Campus: Urban; Main Arnold Janssen Campus Corner J.P. Rizal and Fr. J.L. Bates St., Albay District, Legazpi City; Satellite Josef Freinademetz Campus Capt. F. Aquende Drive, Cruzada, Legazpi City
- Newspaper: The Channel (College); The Divinian Frontier (Senior High School); The Divinian Publication (Junior High School)
- Alma Mater song: DWCL Hymn
- Patron Saints: Arnold Janssen; Joseph Freinademetz
- Colors: Gray Blue
- Nickname: Divinian Falcons
- Sporting affiliations: PRISAA; ACAA
- Mascot: Red Falcon
- Website: www.dwc-legazpi.edu

The Divine Word College of Legazpi (DWCL) is a private Catholic coeducational basic and higher education institution run by the Philippine Central Province of the Society of the Divine Word in Legazpi, Albay, Philippines. It was founded by Rev. Fr. Juan Carullo, a retired army chaplain in 1947.

== Administration ==
=== Presidents ===
- Rev. Fr. Joseph L. Bates, SVD (1961-1971)
- Rev. Fr. Donald Mulrenan, SVD, OIC (1968-1970)
- Rev. Fr. Florante S. Camacho, SVD (1970-1973)
- Rev. Fr. Valentino D. Darunday, SVD (1973-1979)
- Rev. Fr. Alfredo A. Reyes, SVD (1979-1985)
- Rev. Fr. Eleuterio S. Lacaron, SVD (1985-1989)
- Rev. Fr. Alfredo Reyes, SVD (1989-1990)
- Rev. Fr. Restituto A. Lumanlan, SVD (1990-1993)
- Rev. Fr. Joel Thomson Ll. Maribao, SVD (1993-1994)
- Rev. Fr. Jose M. Calucag, SVD (1994-1998)
- Rev. Fr. Ignacio C. Joaquin, SVD, OIC (1998-1999)
- Rev. Fr. Michael O. Padua, SVD (1999-2002)
- Rev. Fr. Francisco Antonio T. Estepa, SVD (2002-2008)
- Rev. Fr. Crispin Cordero, SVD (2008-2017)
- Rev. Fr. Nielo M. Cantilado, SVD (2017-2026)
- Rev. Fr. Renato A. Tampol, SVD, PhD (2026-present)

== Academics ==
=== Schools ===
- Graduate School of Business Management
- School of Business, Management, and Accountancy
- School of Education, Arts and Sciences
- School of Engineering and Computer Studies
- School of Hospitality Management
- School of Nursing

=== Graduate Programs ===
- Master in Business Administration (MBA)
  - Non-Thesis
- Master in Public Management (MPM)
  - Major in: Public Administration
  - Non-Thesis

=== Degree Programs ===
- Bachelor of Science in Accountancy
- Bachelor of Science in Management Accounting
- Bachelor of Science in Internal Auditing
- Bachelor of Science in Business Administration
  - Major in:
    - Financial Management
    - Human Resource Management
    - Marketing Management
    - Operations Management
- Bachelor of Science in Psychology
- Bachelor of Physical Education
- Bachelor of Special Needs Education
- Bachelor in Human Services
- Bachelor of Elementary Education
- Bachelor of Secondary Education
  - Major in:
    - English
    - Science
    - Mathematics
    - Filipino
- Bachelor of Science in Electrical Engineering
- Bachelor of Science in Civil Engineering
  - Major in:
    - Construction Engineering and Management
    - Structural Engineering
- Bachelor of Science in Computer Science
  - Major in:
    - Software Development
- Bachelor of Science in Information Technology
  - Major in:
    - Multimedia Technology
    - Web Development Technology
- Bachelor of Library and Information Science
- Bachelor of Science in Hospitality Management
- Bachelor of Science in Nursing

=== Non-Degree Programs ===
- College Teaching Certification

== Campuses ==
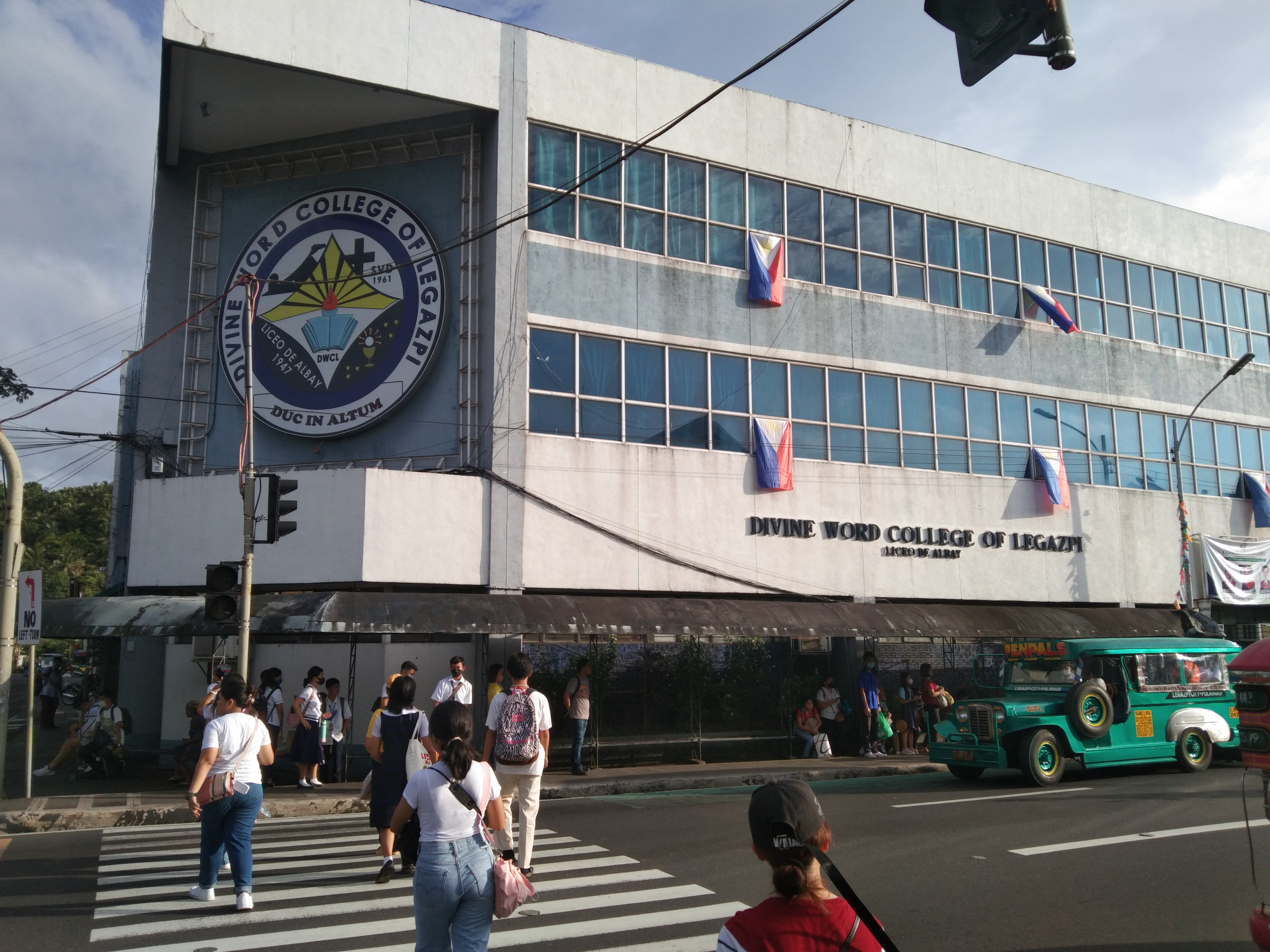
Arnold Janssen Campus

The Divine Word College of Legazpi has two campuses: the Arnold Janssen Campus and the Josef Freinademetz Campus. The Josef Freinademetz Campus administers the basic education department and tertiary level schools such as the School of Nursing and the School of Hospitality Management. The rest of the undergraduate schools and the Graduate School are assigned to the Arnold Janssen Campus.

== See also ==
- List of SVD schools
