= Divine Word College of Urdaneta =

Roman Catholic college in Pangasinan, Philippines

- Dalubhasaang Banal na Salita ng Urdaneta (Filipino)
- Motto: Verbo Veritatis, Verbo Vitae
- Motto in English: To the Word of Truth, to the Word of Life
- Type: Private Roman Catholic Non-profit Coeducational Basic and Higher education institution
- Established: 1967; 59 years ago
- Religious affiliation: Roman Catholic (Verbites)
- Academic affiliations: DWEA CEAP
- President: Fr. Jhun Joel L. Templa, SVD
- Principal: Carolina T. Sayapen (Elementary Principal); Marlyn Laroco (High School Principal)
- Students: Elementary - Approx. 100; High School - Approx. 600
- Location: Urdaneta City, Pangasinan, (Philippines); 15°58′42″N 120°34′32″E
- Campus: Urban 6.5 hectares (65,000 m^{2})
- Alma Mater song: DWCU Hymn
- Patron Saint: St. Joseph Freinademetz (Feast Day: Jan. 29)
- Colors: Blue and Gold
- Nickname: Divinians
- Website: dwcu.wordpress.com
- Location in Luzon Location in the Philippines

The Divine Word College of Urdaneta is a private Catholic educational institution of higher learning run by the Philippine Northern Province of the Society of the Divine Word in Urdaneta City, Pangasinan, Philippines. It was founded by the Divine Word Missionaries in 1967. Saint Joseph Freinademetz, the first SVD missionary to China, is the patron saint and model of the school.

== School Presidents ==
- Fr. George Hardwart, SVD (1967 -1970)
- Fr. Augustine Herbers, SVD and Fr. Panfilo Ginan, SVD (1970 – 1975)
- Fr. Alfredo A. Reyes, SVD (1975 – 1979)
- Fr. Luis B. Lapus, SVD (1979 – 1983)
- Fr. Dennis D. Lucas, SVD (1983 – 1987)
- Fr. Edwin T. Canonizado, SVD (1987 – 1990)
- Fr. Michael O. Padua, SVD (1990 – 1993)
- Fr. Dominador O. Ramos, SVD (1993 – 1997)
- Fr. Limneo O. Dangupon, SVD (1997 – 2002)
- Fr. Randolph D. Botial, SVD (2002 – 2008)
- Fr. Dominador O. Ramos, SVD, (2008 – 2011)
- Fr. Gil T. Manalo, SVD (2011 – 2017)
- Fr. Roberto J. Ibay, SVD (2017–Present)
