= Philippine Accrediting Association of Schools, Colleges and Universities =

Accreditor of educational institutions in the Philippines

- The association's logo
- Abbreviation: PAASCU
- Formation: November 5, 1957; 68 years ago
- Founder: Bro. Hyacinth Gabriel Connon, FSC
- Type: Higher education accreditation; Nonprofit organization
- Headquarters: The Tower at Emerald Square, Rizal corner Tuazon Streets, Quezon City, Metro Manila 1109 Philippines
- President: Bro. Edmundo L. Fernandez FSC
- Website: paascu.org.ph

The Philippine Accrediting Association of Schools, Colleges and Universities (PAASCU) is a service organization which accredits academic programs as meeting commonly accepted standards of quality education. It is a private, voluntary, non-profit, non-stock corporation registered with the Securities and Exchange Commission of the Philippines.

PAASCU is composed of different private educational institutions which validate other private schools with a quality standard attained with regard to their programs.

== History ==
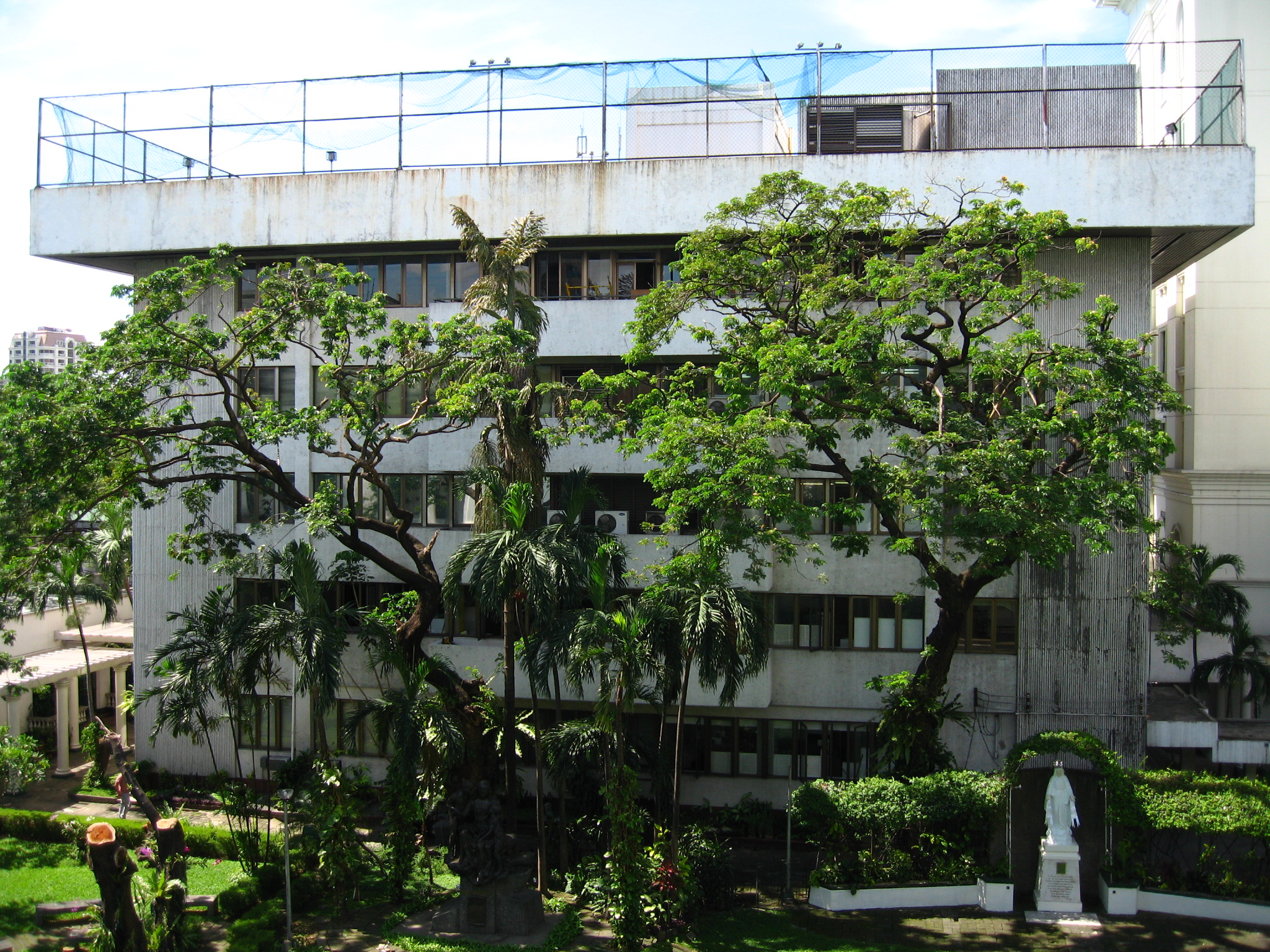
The Br. Connon Hall named after Bro. Gabriel Connon FSC, president of De La Salle University (DLSU) and the CEAP when PAASCU was established in 1957.

PAASCU was established in November 5, 1957 as a private, voluntary, non-profit and non-stock corporation. Under the suggestion of Bro. Hyacinth Gabriel Connon, F.S.C., president of the Catholic Educational Association of the Philippines (CEAP) in 1953, the CEAP came to the conclusion that standards needed to be created to improve Catholic education in the country. A Manual of Accreditation with self-survey forms was crafted for eight different areas: Purposes and Objectives, Faculty, Instruction, Library, Laboratories, Physical Plant, Student Services, and Administration. The CEAP also established an accreditation committee to form the accreditation association and its standards. With the help of Fr. James Meany, S.J. and other key supporters, the PAASCU was established with Fr. Meany as inaugural president in 1957. The Bureau of Education and Culture (now the Department of Education) formally endorsed PAASCU as an accrediting agency in November 1967.

In 1977, the Federation of Accrediting Agencies of the Philippines was established, with PAASCU and as one of three founding members. In 1991, the International Network for Quality Assurance Agencies in Higher Education (INQAAHE) was also established with PAASCU as a founding member. INQAAHE is a global association of over 200 organizations are active in theory and practice of quality assurance higher education.

PAASCU is also one of the founding members of the Asia-Pacific Quality Network (APQN). The APQN was established with the purpose of satisfying the needs of quality assurance agencies in higher education. PAASCU has since led the way in that regard.

== Accredited Programs by PAASCU ==
These are the following programs that are accredited by PAASCU, with subordinate programs listed in bullets:

No.	Program
1	Accountancy
2	Agriculture
3	Basic Medical Education
4	Business
5	Computer Science
	● Information Technology
	● Information Management
	● Information Systems
6	Criminal justice
7	Education
	● Elementary
	● Secondary
8	Engineering
	● Civil Engineering
	● Chemical Engineering
	● Computer Engineering
	● Electrical Engineering
	● Electronics and Communications Engineering
	● Industrial Engineering
	● Manufacturing Engineering and Management
	● Mechanical Engineering

No.	Program
9	Entrepreneurship
10	Graduate Education
	● Arts and Sciences
	● Business Administration
	● Education
	● Nursing
	● Public Health
11	Hospitality Management
12	Interior Design
13	Liberal Arts
14	Medical Technology
15	Nursing
16	Nutrition and Dietetics
17	Occupational Therapy
18	Pharmacy
19	Radiologic Technology
20	Social Work
21	Tourism

== Standards ==
PAASCU accreditation is not based on comparison between institutions but primarily by the degree to which a school's evaluated areas of practise match its avowed purposes. Thus, a school is judged on the basis of the "total pattern" it has presented.

== See also ==
- Educational accreditation
- Higher education in the Philippines
- List of universities and colleges in the Philippines
- Commission on Higher Education
- Professional Regulation Commission
- Federation of Accrediting Agencies of the Philippines
