= List of Jesuit educational institutions in the Philippines =

Seal of the Society of Jesus.

This is a list of Jesuit educational institutions in the Philippines. (Note: Primarily, only in the Universities of Italy and the Jesuit Higher Education Institutes of the Philippines, are that which are often referred to as Ateneos rather than Colleges and Universities.)

== Tertiary institutions ==
Institution	Location	President	Students	Athletic nickname	School colors	Founded
Ateneo de Manila University	Quezon City	Fr. Roberto C. Yap, S.J.	11,465	Blue Eagles	Blue & White	1859
Ateneo de Zamboanga University	Zamboanga City	Fr. Guillrey Anthony M. Andal, S.J.	9,000	Azul Aguilas	Blue & White	1912
Xavier University – Ateneo de Cagayan	Cagayan de Oro	Fr. Mars P. Tan, S.J.	10,564	Blue Crusaders	Blue & White	1933
Ateneo de Naga University	Naga, Camarines Sur	Fr. Aristotle C. Dy, S.J.	8,000	Golden Knights	Blue & Gold	1940
Ateneo de Davao University	Davao City	Fr. Karel S. San Juan, S.J.	13,676	Blue Knights	Blue & White	1948

== Basic Education institutions ==
Institution	Location	President	Enrollment	Athletic nickname	School colors	Founded
Loyola College of Culion	Culion, Palawan	Fr. Neupito J. Saicon, Jr., S.J.	555	Blue Jaguars	Blue & White	1936
Sacred Heart School – Ateneo de Cebu	Mandaue	Fr. Michael I. Pineda. S.J.	3,000 approx.	Magis Eagles	Blue - Gold - White	1955
Xavier School San Juan	San Juan, Metro Manila	Fr. Joseph Y. Haw, S.J.	4,000 approx.	Golden Stallions	Blue & Gold	1956
Ateneo de Iloilo – Santa Maria Catholic School	Iloilo City	Fr. Arnel T. Ong, S.J.	1,343	Blue Dragons	Blue & White	1958
Pangantucan Community High School	Pangantucan, Bukidnon	Fr. Marlon Fabros, SJ	1,172		Blue & White	1968
Xavier School Nuvali	Calamba, Laguna	Fr. Joseph Y. Haw, S.J.	1,000 approx.	Golden Stallions	Blue & Gold	2012

== Defunct institutions ==
Institution	Location	Athletic nickname	School colors	Founded	Closed
Ateneo de Tuguegarao (currently, University of Saint Louis Tuguegarao)	Tuguegarao			1945	1962
Ateneo de San Pablo (currently, Liceo de San Pablo)	San Pablo, Laguna	Purple Panther	Purple & White	1947	1978
Bellarmine College	Baguio				
Berchmans College	Cebu City			1949	1963
Immaculate Conception School (Note: Presently known as La Salle University - Ozamiz)	Ozamiz			1929	1939 (Note: School turned over to the Missionary Society of St. Columban in 1939)
Colegio de San Ildefonso (Note: The University of San Carlos claims to trace its foundation to the San Ildefonso, and also claims to be the oldest school in the Philippines. This claim is opposed by the University of Santo Tomas.)	Cebu City			1595	1768
Universidad de San Ignacio (Note: Opened as the Colegio de Manila, and also known as the Colegio Máximo de San Ignacio. The school also had an extension residential college, the Colegio de San José, which later became the San José Seminary, now located inside the Ateneo de Manila University.)	Manila			1590	1768

== Distribution map ==
Geographic distribution of Jesuit educational institutions in the Philippines
Geographic distribution of Jesuit basic education institutions in the Philippines
Geographic distribution of defunct Jesuit educational institutions in the Philippines

== Gallery ==
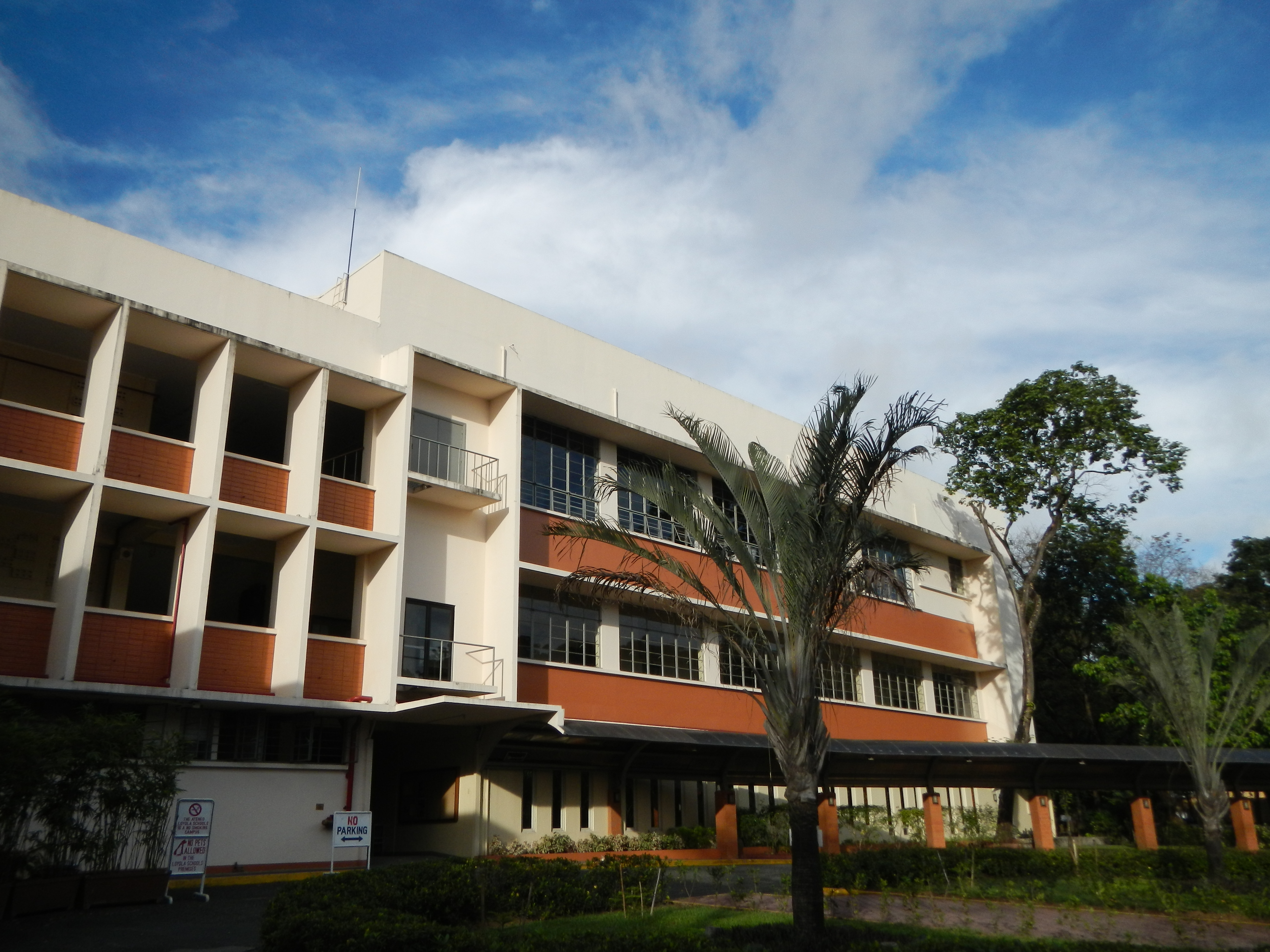
Ateneo de Manila University

Ateneo de Zamboanga University

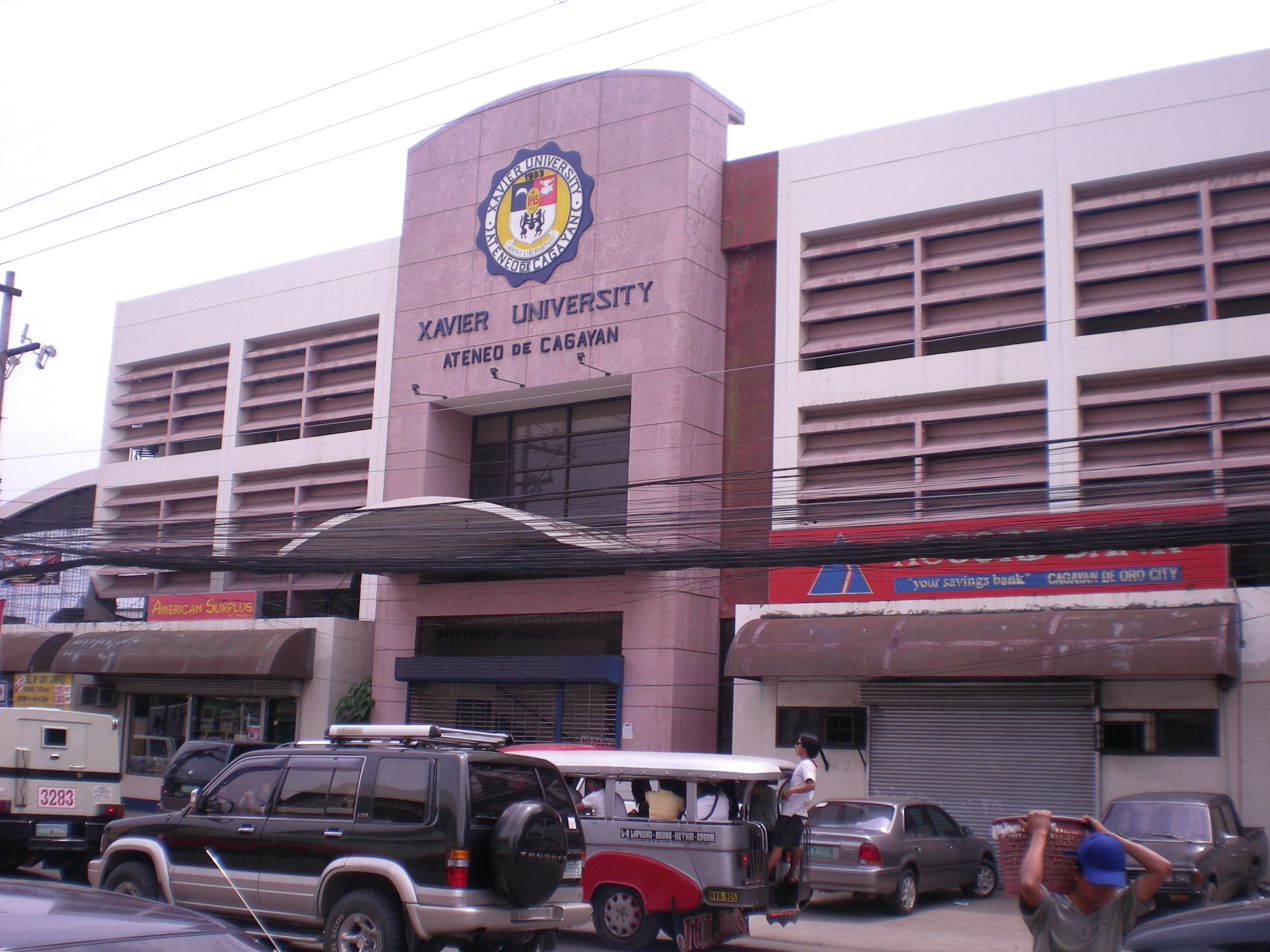
Ateneo de Cagayan – Xavier University

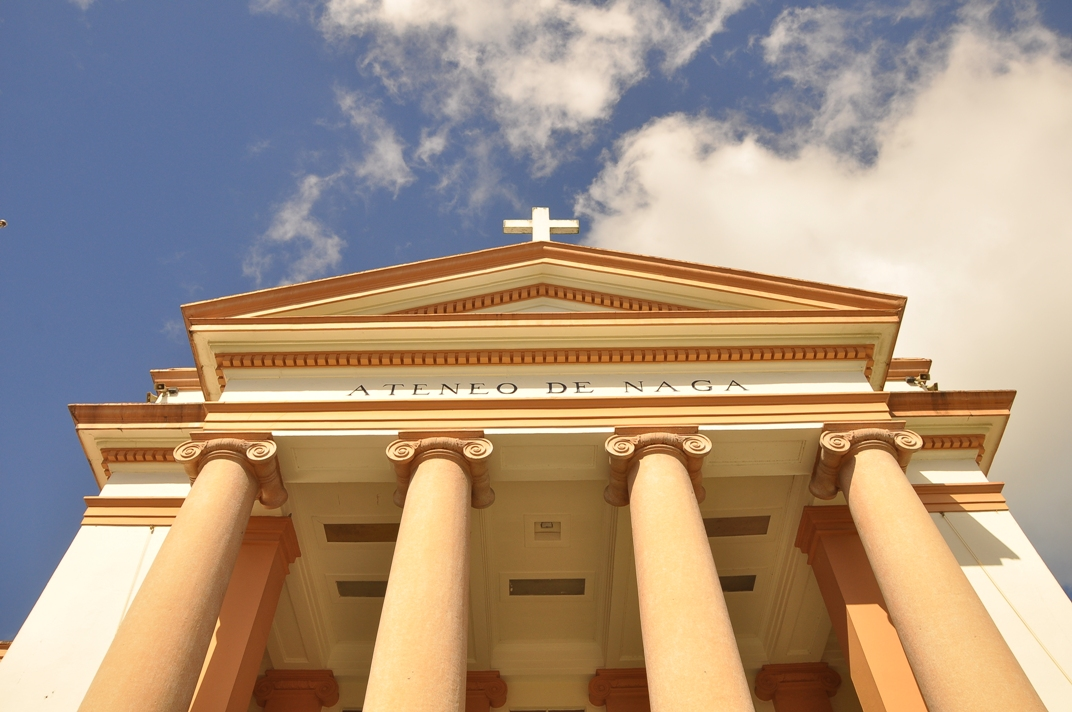
Ateneo de Naga University

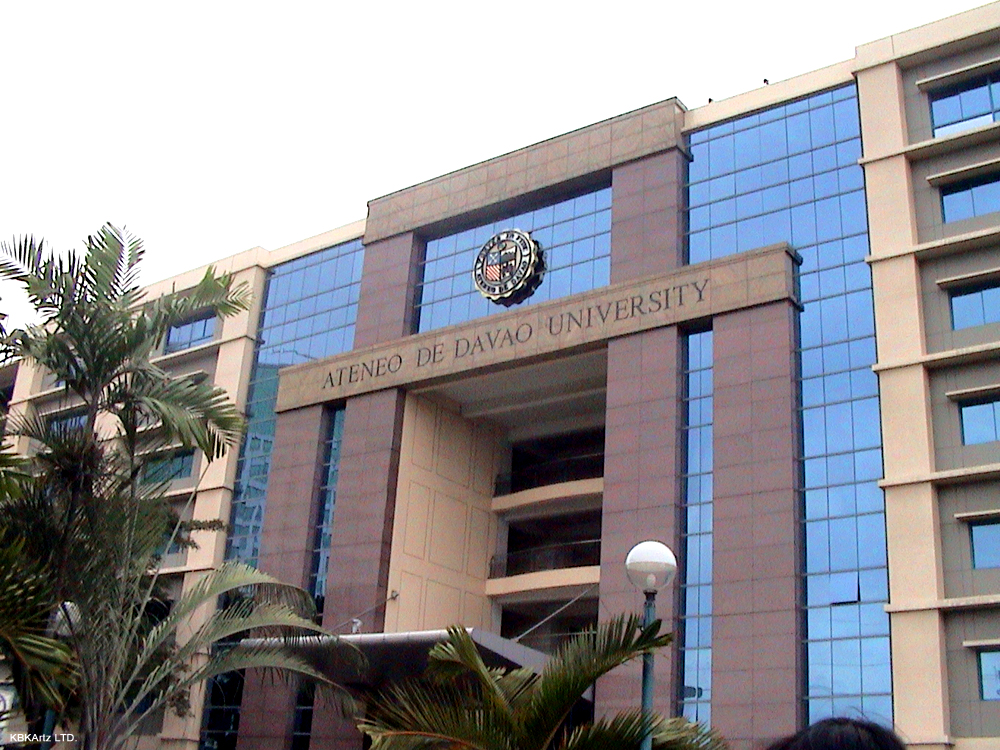
Ateneo de Davao University

== See also ==
- List of Jesuit educational institutions
- List of Jesuit sites
