= Association of Jesuit Colleges and Universities in Asia Pacific =

Educational organization

The Association of Jesuit Colleges and Universities in Asia Pacific (AJCU-AP) is an association of 22 Jesuit higher educational institutions on the territory of the Jesuit Conference of Asia Pacific.

== Members ==
Current list of members, as of 2019:

- Ateneo de Davao University
- Ateneo de Manila University
  - Loyola School of Theology
- Ateneo de Naga University
- Ateneo de Zamboanga University
- Xavier University – Ateneo de Cagayan
- Loyola College of Culion
- Sanata Dharma University
- Polytechnic ATMI Surakarta
- Elisabeth University of Music
- Sophia University
- Sogang University
- Fu Jen Catholic University
  - St. Robert Bellarmine Faculty of Theology
- Newman College, University of Melbourne
- Jesuit College of Spirituality
- Myanmar Leadership Center
- Instituto São João de Brito
- Xavier Learning Community
- Ricci Hall, University of Hong Kong
