= Joel Tabora =

Filipino priest (born 1947)

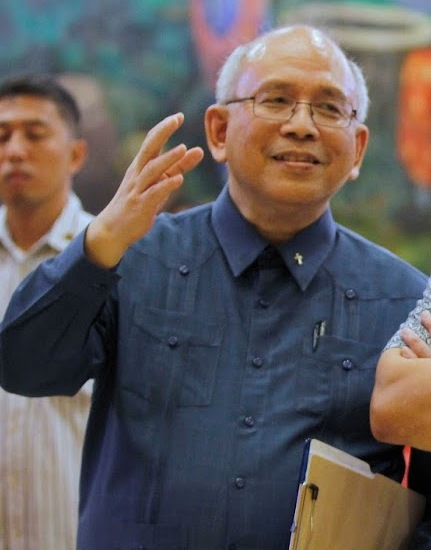
- Tabora during an environmental summit in August 2016.

4th President of Ateneo de Davao University
- In office June 1, 2011 – September 14, 2023
- Preceded by: Antonio Samson
- Succeeded by: Karel San Juan

2nd President of Ateneo de Naga University
- In office August 28, 1999 – May 10, 2011
- Preceded by: Raul Bonoan
- Succeeded by: Primitivo Viray Jr.

Personal life
- Born: September 26, 1947 (age 78) Manila, Philippines
- Education: Ateneo de Manila University; Leopold-Franzens University

Religious life
- Religion: Christianity
- Denomination: Roman Catholic
- Order: Society of Jesus
- Website: taborasj.wordpress.com

Joel Eduque Tabora, S.J. is a Filipino Jesuit priest and was the fourth president of Ateneo de Davao University from 2011 to 2023. He served as the president of PAASCU from 2012 to 2021. He also served as the second president of Ateneo de Naga University from 1999 to 2011. He is currently taking his sabbatical leave in Malaybalay, Bukidnon, Philippines.

== Early life and education ==
Tabora was born on September 26, 1947, in Manila, Philippines. In 1960, he spent his elementary education at the St. Agnes Parish School in San Francisco, California, where his father was serving in the foreign service. After his return to the Philippines, he enrolled at the Ateneo de Manila University in his high school years. He obtained his Master of Arts degree in Philosophy from Ateneo de Manila University and completed his doctoral studies in Philosophy at Leopold-Franzens University in Innsbruck, Austria. His doctoral research predominantly centers on the works of Karl Marx.

== Early career ==
He was an instructor at the Ateneo de Manila University, a rector of the San Jose Seminary from 1989 to 1995, and became president of the Loyola School of Theology in Ateneo de Manila University from 1994 to 1999.

== Activity ==
He serves as a trustee at Xavier University (Cagayan de Oro City), Ateneo de Zamboanga University, Catholic Ministry for Deaf People, Philippine Jesuit Foundation, Catholic Educational Association of the Philippines (CEAP) and Davao Association of Catholic Schools (DACS-CEAP XI). He is also the president of the Association of Jesuit Colleges and Universities in Asia Pacific (AJCU-AP).

=== Views on Reproductive Health Bill ===
As the advocacy chair of the Catholic Education Association of the Philippine, Tabora supports bishops in opposing any law that includes provisions for "abortifacient" birth regulation, which forces Catholics "to act against his or her conscience" and "usurps" parents the right to educate their children on sexuality, but not everyone in there is Catholic in a "Plural" society people should have to come together and understand what is the demand of common good. Tabora points out that reproductive health should be a product of negotiation and open communication with one another.
