= Adrian Remodo =

Adrian Remodo (born 19 July 1981) is a Bikol essayist and writer, from the Bicol Region of the Philippines, who has been instrumental in the post–World War II literary resurgence of Bikol literature. He was the 2006 winner of the regional Tomás Arejola Prize for Bikol literature in the Saysay (history) category. Remodo also won a 2008 Salita ng Taon (“Word of the Year”) award from the Filipinas Institute of Translation.

According to the Southern Luzon Inquirer, Remodo believes that the renaissance of Bikol writing began in earnest in the 1980s, “when preliminary efforts were made to retrieve and compile written works and oral folklore,” noting that many young writers have “found a channel for their works in fiction, poetry, drama and essays.”

He was a panellist at the 2009 Juliana Arejola-Fajardo Workshop on Bikol Literature, facilitated by the Arejola Foundation for Social Progress. Remodo teaches at the Jesuit-operated Ateneo de Naga University.
