= Raul Bonoan =

Filipino priest (1935–1999)

- Bonoan in 1994

1st President of Ateneo de Naga University
- In office April 1, 1989 – April 6, 1999
- Preceded by: John Joseph Phelan
- Succeeded by: Joel Tabora

Personal life
- Born: July 3, 1935 Tondo, Manila, Philippines
- Died: April 6, 1999 (aged 63) Baguio, Philippines
- Cause of death: Heart attack
- Resting place: Novaliches, Quezon City, Philippines
- Education: Berchmans College; Woodstock College; Loyola School of Theology

Religious life
- Religion: Christianity
- Denomination: Roman Catholicism
- Order: Jesuits
- Ordination: June 10, 1965

Raul "Rolly" Jacinto Bonoan, SJ (July 3, 1935 – April 6, 1999) was a Filipino Jesuit educator, former president of the Ateneo de Naga University, and Rizal scholar.

== Early life and education ==
Bonoan was born in Tondo, Manila, Philippines on July 3, 1935, as the eldest among four of his brothers. He lived in Tondo and Cubao for most of his childhood and studied in the Ateneo de Manila together with his brothers. He pursued philosophical studies at Berchmans College, Cebu from 1956 to 1959 and received a Licentiate in Sacred Theology at Woodstock College, Maryland in 1966. He later earned a Ph.D. in Theology from the Loyola School of Theology in 1977 with a dissertation on the Rizal-Pastells correspondence.

== Early career ==
He was a professor of theology at the Jesuit-run Ateneo de Manila University from 1965 to 1988. In the context of the Filipinization movement and radicalism in the university, provoked in part by the declaration of martial law in 1972, Bonoan advanced a Filipino theology without relying on Western paradigms. His course in theology was unique in its focus on history and the local context in which Christianity had developed. During this time, Bonoan also served as moderator of the Ateneo Catechetical Instruction League (ACIL), acted as spiritual adviser to students, and led community efforts to aid flood victims of Central Luzon.

In 1980, Bonoan was appointed dean of the School of Social Sciences and soon established the Office of Research and Publications. He wrote homilies in memory of Ateneo alumni such as Edgar Jopson, Evelio Javier, and Ninoy Aquino who perished in the tumultuous few years that followed. During the snap elections of 1986, he provided shelter to Commission on Elections (COMELEC) technicians who refused to manipulate official election results to favor Marcos.

== Religious life ==
Bonoan joined the Society of Jesus on June 20, 1952. He was ordained priest in New York on June 10, 1965. He was the dean of the Ateneo de Manila College of Arts when he received the announcement of his appointment as president of Ateneo de Naga in 1989.

== Rizal scholar ==
In scholarship, Bonoan is noted for his study on the then unpublished letters between José Rizal and his Jesuit spiritual adviser Padre Pablo Pastells. In The Rizal–Pastells Correspondence (1994), Bonoan examined the internal conflict in the national hero, one marked by a struggle between Enlightenment ideas (Rizal's liberal leanings having fully matured during his stay in Europe) and his Catholic upbringing in making sense of his own politics.

He summarises thus:

The Rizal-Pastells [c]orrespondence was a philosophic-theological discussion turned into a debate on three principal topics: the role of private judgment, the problem of God, and revelation.

He continues:

It is my considered view that Rizal was in search of an intellectual framework and support, a political theology if you will, for the social, political, and cultural transformation of his people. Finding none but hostility in the Church and the religious orders, he turned to Enlightenment philosophies, which provided him with a rich armory of idiom, imagery, principles, concepts and ideas for the ongoing discourse on "national redemption." Rizal's unhappy religious situation must be laid at the door of the institutional Church for her closedness to his legitimate aspirations and those of his people. Shut in within their narrow theology and Spanish loyalties, they failed to show Rizal how his political involvement and espousal of separation from Spain were the dictates of a genuinely Christian conscience; how his attacks against Spanish colonial rule and even against the ministers of the church would not necessarily impugn the essence of the church and the Catholic faith; and how work toward progress and development could be in keeping with gospel values. (see Bonoan, 28-32, as cited in Reyes, 21-6)

== Ateneo de Naga ==
Bonoan is honored for reviving the Ateneo de Naga in Camarines Sur, Bicol (one of the most impoverished regions in the Philippines) where he was assigned from 1989 to his death. At the time, the institution faced imminent closure, with dwindling funds and a sharp decrease in enrollments. During his tenure, Bonoan engaged in fundraising initiatives; revised the curriculum transforming it into one that addressed local needs, in particular, one that promoted Bikol culture; invested heavily in faculty development; improved facilities; and expanded educational programs by offering degrees in business and the sciences.

In Naga, Bonoan worked closely with local government, serving as secretary-general of the Bikol Regional Development Summit, and maintained a close relationship with Naga City Mayor Jesse Robredo.

== Death and legacy ==
Bonoan suffered a heart attack while jogging at Mirador Jesuit Villa in Baguio at the age of 63. A building in the Ateneo de Naga Bagumbayan campus is named after him.

== Notable works ==
- The Rizal–Pastells Correspondence: The Hitherto Unpublished Letters of Jose Rizal and Portions of Fr. Pablo Pastell's Fourth Letter and Translation of the Correspondence Together with a Historical Background and Theological Critique. 1994. 229. Ateneo de Manila University Press (1994). ISBN 978-9715501231.
- Light to the World: The Vision of Fr. Raul J. Bonoan, S.J. Editor, Soledad S. Reyes. Office of Research and Publications, Ateneo de Manila University (2000). ASIN B007ES3S6O.
- "Rizal's Record at the Ateneo" (1979)
- "Rizal's First Published Essay: El Amor Patrio" (1996)
