= Honesto Pesimo Jr. =

- Died: November 8, 2021; Naga City
- Education: Ateneo de Naga University
- Occupations: Teacher, writer
- Writing career
- Language: Tagalog, Central Bikol
- Genre: Poetry
- Notable work: Bagyo sa Oktubre (2009)
- Notable awards: Gawad Ka Amado, Naga City Special Mayoral Award

Honesto "Jun" Pesimo Jr. is a Bicolano writer, teacher and the author of Bagyo sa Oktubre (2009). He is a founding member of Kabulig-Bikol, and one of the editors of Bangraw kan Arte, Literatura asin Kultura. He also edited the book entitled Girok: erotika published by Kabulig-Bikol in 2017.

His poems appeared in Home Life magazine, Burak, An Tambobong nin Literaturang Bikolnon and Ani 39: Kahayupan/The Animal Kingdom. His poem was among the works included in the book Sagurong: 100 na Kontemporanyong Rawitdawit sa Manlain-lain na Tataramon Bikol (2011). In 2013, his short story entitled Kublit was anthologized in Hagong: Mga Osipon edited by Paz Verdades Santos and Francisco Peñones Jr.

In 2000, Pesimo was among the participants at 36th University of the Philippines National Creative Writing Workshop held in Baguio. He was one of the panelists at Juliana Arejola-Fajardo Workshop sa Pagsurat-Bikol in 2004. He also served as a panelist at Saringsing Writers Workshop, the annual writers workshop of Parasurat Bikolnon, in 2014 and 2015.
