= St. John de Britto Institute =

Catholic educational institution in Timor-Leste

Coordinates: 8°34′28.12″S 125°27′42.58″E

- Instituto São João de Brito
- Motto: Educar para servir (Latin)
- Motto in English: To educate for service
- Established: 2015; 11 years ago
- Founders: Society of Jesus
- Religious affiliation: Roman Catholic (Jesuit)
- Academic affiliations: AJCU-AP
- Rector: Sidelizio Ornai Pereira, SJ
- Academic staff: 16
- Students: 99
- Location: Kasait-Ulmera, Timor-Leste
- Campus: Rural
- Website: BrittoInstitute

The St John de Britto Institute, also referred to by its acronym ISIB, or by its Portuguese name Instituto São João de Brito, is a private Catholic coeducational higher education institution run by the Timor-Leste Region of the Society of Jesus in Kasait-Ulmera, Timor-Leste. It was established by the Jesuits in 2015 to train students to be secondary school teachers for the country. The school was named after St John de Britto, a Portuguese Jesuit missionary and martyr.

== History ==
From 2011, the Jesuits opened two schools on a common campus near Kasait, not far from Dili: the ISIB, and Colégio Santo Inácio de Loiolá. In 2017 ISIB operated out of classrooms of Loyola in Kasait as construction began there of its own facility. The original intake of ISIB was 25 students who would assist at Loyola College on the grounds in their first two years and in their third and fourth years would be supervised while teaching at various secondary schools throughout the country. It first offered majors in English and Religious Education but intends to extend offerings to mathematics, Portuguese, and Timorese History and Culture.

== Collaborative effort ==
The school cooperates with other Jesuit works in the country: a mission parish with secondary school and health care program in Railaco, a public service Audiovisual Production House, and Jesuit Social Service Timor-Leste which aims to foster volunteerism, strengthen communities, and facilitate networking.

== Current situation ==
In 2018 it had 99 students and 16 lecturers. It offers a four-year program aimed at producing professional high school teachers. Fr. Sidelizio Ornai Pereira, SJ is the rector of the institute 2018.

== See also ==
- List of Jesuit sites
