= Conrado de Quiros =

Filipino journalist (1951–2023)

Conrado S. de Quiros
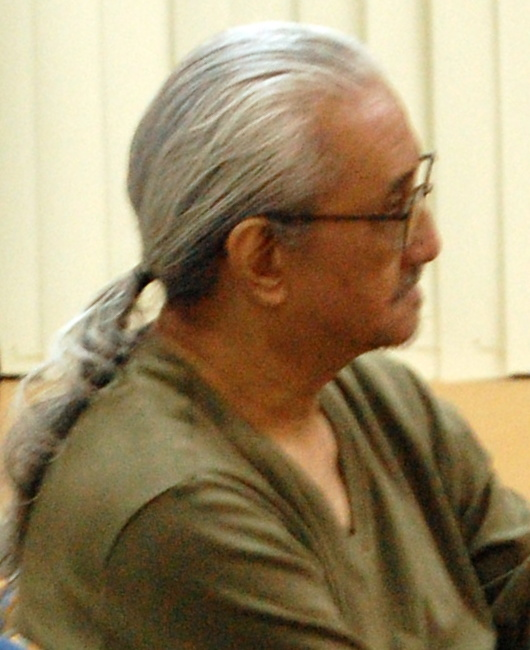
- Born: 27 May 1951; Manila, Philippines
- Died: 6 November 2023 (aged 72)
- Occupations: Journalist, columnist, writer

Conrado de Quiros (27 May 1951 – 6 November 2023) was a Filipino journalist, columnist, and writer who covered Philippine politics from the 1980s to the early decades of the 21st century.

== Early life and education ==
Conrado S. de Quiros was born in Manila on 27 May 1951. He grew up in Naga, Camarines Sur, where his family originated. De Quiros took his secondary studies in the Ateneo de Naga, graduating as valedictorian in 1968. This enabled him to receive a scholarship at the Ateneo de Manila, where he was an Economics major at the School of Arts and Letters from 1970 to 1972 and a contributor to the collegiate publications Pandayan and Pugadlawin.

During the Martial law era, de Quiros and his family rented an apartment that became an underground refuge for cultural activists. At the same time, he worked as a writer for President Ferdinand Marcos' speechwriter and spokesperson, Adrian Cristobal, during which he helped ghostwrite Marcos' book Notes on the New Society.

== Career ==
De Quiros started his column There’s the Rub in 1987 in the Philippine Daily Globe. In 1991, he moved to the Philippine Daily Inquirer, retaining his column until he took medical leave in 2014 following a stroke. His editorial writing was noted for his biting wit and subverting standard conventions. Writing in one instance on the presidency of Gloria Macapagal-Arroyo, he described the "true state of the nation" by filling the space with "Hello, Garci...", a reference to the scandal that plagued her reelection in 2004. Writing on what to expect from an administration led by Arroyo's rival, Fernando Poe Jr., he put a blank space instead. He also served as a host of TV5's news program TEN: The Evening News.

De Quiros also authored several books including Dead Aim: How Marcos Ambushed Philippine Democracy, which covered the Marcos dictatorship; Tongues on Fire, a compilation of his speeches; Flowers from the Rubble; Dance of the Dunces, a compilation of essays from his newspaper columns; and Honorary Woman: The Life of Raul S. Roco, a biography of former senator Raul Roco. He also founded the Policy Review and Editorial Services (PRESS), a group which aimed to help non-governmental organizations get their stories across to the media and taught in the University of the Philippines College of Mass Communication.

De Quiros rarely answered local TV interviews in Filipino and for less than five times, he wrote his column using that language.

== Death ==
De Quiros died on 6 November 2023, at the age of 72. His death was confirmed by his brother that evening.

== Selected works ==
- Flowers from the Rubble: Essays on Life, Death and Remembering (1990)
- Dance of the Dunces (1991)
- Dead Aim: How Marcos Ambushed Philippine Democracy (1997)
- Tongues on Fire (2007)
- Honorary Woman: The Life of Raul S. Roco (2015)

== Selected awards ==
- Best Column, Catholic Mass Media Awards (1993)
- Rotary Journalism Award for Print (1999)
- Best Opinion Piece, Society of Publishers in Asia Editorial Excellence Award (2003)
- Hall of Fame Award for Opinion Writers, Rotary Club of Manila (2004)
