= Jerry Bitoon =

Filipino priest and environmentalist

The Reverend Monsignor Jerry V. Bitoon SThD
- Church: Catholic Church
- Province: Manila
- Diocese: San Pablo

Orders
- Ordination: May 24, 1979

Personal details
- Born: May 16, 1954 (age 72)

Jerry Veluz Bitoon (born May 16, 1954) is a Filipino Catholic priest and activist.

== Education ==
Bitoon received a doctorate in sacred theology (SThD) from the Pontifical University of the Holy Cross in Rome, Italy in 1990.

== Ministry ==
Bitoon was ordained as a priest by San Pablo Bishop Pedro Bantigue on May 24, 1979.

As a priest, Jerry Bitoon has advocated for better treatment of the environment. He has served as rector of the St. Peter's College Seminary in San Pablo City, Laguna; in the early to mid-2000s, Bitoon and other priests in the seminary also served as caregivers of Quirino "Lolo" G. Glorioso, who was then the oldest active priest in the Philippines at over 100 years old. In late 2000, Bitoon began serving as a convenor of the Laguna chapter of Kongreso ng Mamamayang Pilipino II (KOMPIL II), which held rallies against corruption in President Joseph Estrada's administration.

During the election season in 2001, Bitoon took part in an initiative by civic groups to improve voter education in both San Pablo City and the province of Laguna. In 2002, Bitoon headed the Krusadang Bayan in San Pablo, which campaigned against the illegal gambling game of jueteng. As head of Krusadang Bayan, Bitoon denounced the assassination of San Pablo-based journalist Sonny Alcantara, stating that it "gives a chilling message to media men and to anyone who would like to denounce evil." On February 1, 2003, the Laguna chapter of the Alas Dose y Medya (lit. '12:30') Movement was launched with Bitoon as overall convenor, aiming to support the government in identifying issues and supporting small and medium enterprises (SMEs) to enhance economic growth. As parish priest of the Parish of Santo Sepulcro in San Pedro, Laguna, he led the submission of a document ("The Parish Profile"), containing the official history of the "Lolo Uweng" image in the parish, to the Diocese of San Pablo, which later became the basis of the parish's shrinehood proclamation in 2006. In May 2004, he was appointed Vicar General of the Diocese of San Pablo. In August 2004, he denounced the assassination of Radio Veritas journalist Fernando Consignado within the latter's home in Nagcarlan, Laguna, stating that "We are angered by the series of killings of media people for this means that democracy is under siege.... Organized moves of the dark forces in our society must be matched with organized forces of the citizenry. During the Hello Garci electoral scandal in 2005, Bitoon expressed disappointment in President Gloria Macapagal Arroyo's apology: "It was not worth the long wait. It was utterly devoid of spontaneity and candidness, traits that normally show innocence and sincerity. It did not come from the heart."

In September 2005, he was appointed by Pope Benedict XVI to be an officer of the Sacred Congregation for the Propagation of the Faith (now the Congregation for the Evangelization of Peoples) in Rome, Italy. He later began serving as a parish priest at the Gesù Nuovo in Naples, Italy by 2008. After Pope Francis' pastoral visit to the Philippines in January 2015, Bitoon helped organized the gathering of overseas Filipino workers at the Vatican upon the pope's return.

On November 7, 2025, Bitoon gathered with Cardinal Pablo Virgilio David and other church leaders and members of civic organizations at the Villa San Miguel in Mandaluyong City, where they signed a petition calling on President Bongbong Marcos to create a truth commission to investigate the crimes committed during the Philippine drug war under President Rodrigo Duterte.

Bitoon currently serves as the rector and parish priest of the Cathedral Parish of Saint Paul the First Hermit (commonly known as the San Pablo Cathedral) in San Pablo; he concurrently serves as a chaplain to Liceo de San Pablo, a parochial school operated by the Diocese of San Pablo, located beside the cathedral.
