= Ateneo de San Pablo =

Former Jesuit school in the Philippines

- Athenaea Sancti Pablensis (Latin)
- The Jesuit school in Southern Tagalog region, Philippines
- Motto: Omnia in Christo (Latin)
- Motto in English: All in Christ
- Type: Private college-preparatory school Roman Catholic Basic education institution
- Active: July 1, 1947–1978
- Founders: Society of Jesus
- Religious affiliation: Roman Catholic (Jesuit)
- Academic affiliations: PAASCU
- Location: Marcos Paulino St. Brgy Poblacion, San Pablo City, Laguna, Philippines; 14°4′0″N 121°20′0″E
- Campus: Urban
- Alma Mater song: Hail, Ateneo Hail!
- Yearbook: The Purple
- Colors: Purple and white
- Nickname: Ateneans
- Mascot: Purple Panther

The Ateneo de San Pablo, also referred to by the acronym AdSP, was a private, Catholic basic education institution ran by the Philippine Province of the Society of Jesus school in San Pablo City, Laguna. It was founded by the Jesuits in 1947. Initially, it only had a high school until the later establishment of a grade school in 1962. In 1978, the Jesuits closed the school after redonating to the Diocese of San Pablo the lot where the Ateneo campus was located.

A new diocesan school was established by the Roman Catholic Diocese of San Pablo named Liceo de San Pablo after the departure of the Jesuits to replace the closed Ateneo school.

== History ==
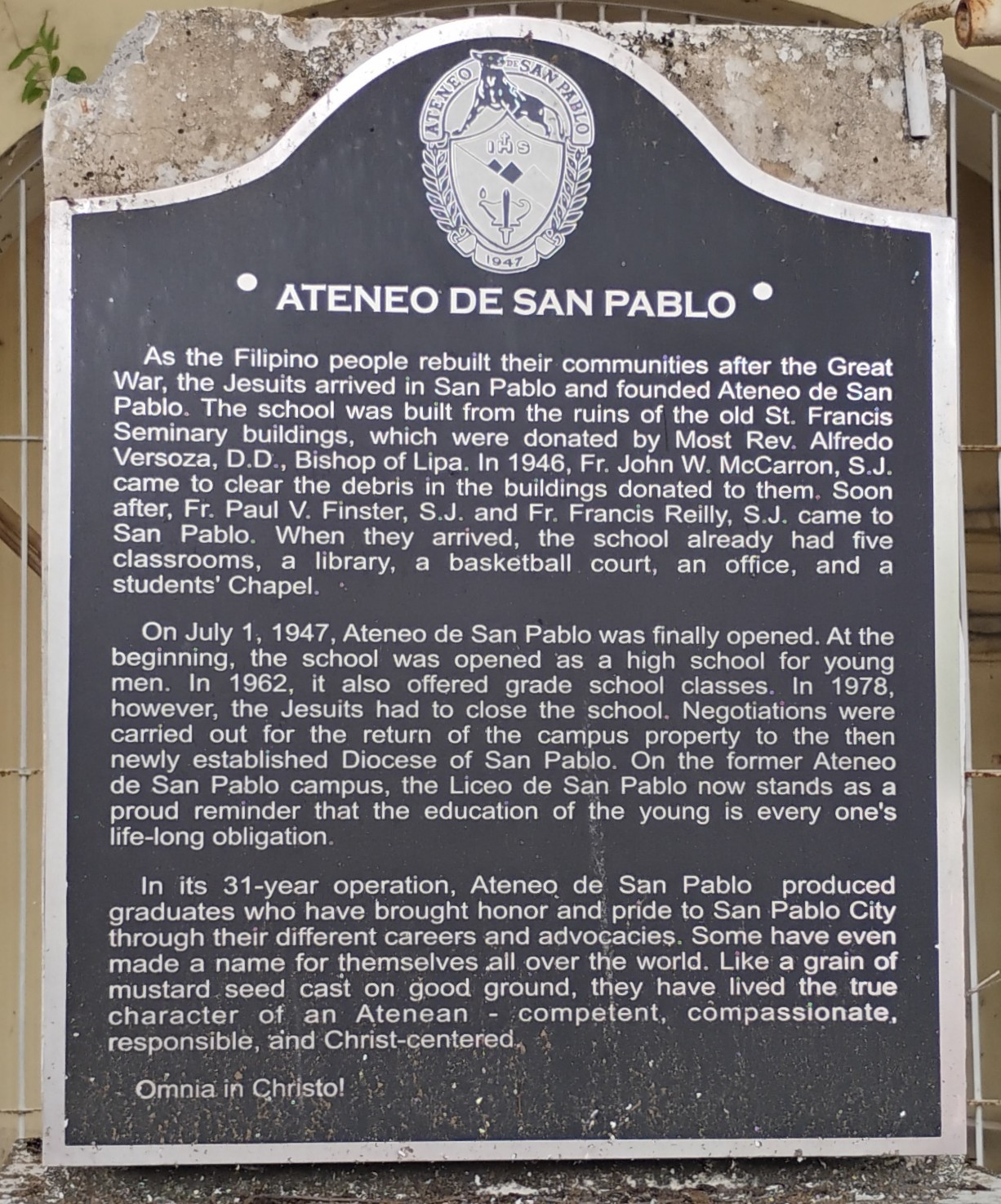
Commemorative plaque at the former site of the school

Bishop Alfredo Versoza of Lipa invited the Jesuits to establish a school in San Pablo, at the time under his diocese's jurisdiction. Progress was significantly delayed, however, by the Second World War and the destruction of the seminary buildings that the Jesuits were supposed to occupy. Only by 1946 were the first Jesuit priests—Fathers John McCarron, Paul Finster, and Francis Reilly—able to arrive. By July 1947, when the Ateneo first opened its doors, its premises had five classrooms, a library of about 2000 books, offices, a basketball court, and three living rooms, as well as 69 first-year students.

Fr. McCarron was appointed as the rector of the Ateneo for a few months, until he was succeeded by Fr. Finster following the former's transfer to another appointment. It was under Fr. Finster that rebuilding of the war-torn premises was begun in earnest, with the assistance of an architect named Carlos Dychangco.

1951 saw the first 36 graduates of the Ateneo complete their secondary studies.

Fr. Finster was succeeded as rector by Fr. Eusebio Salvador in September 1954. The school's auditorium-gymnasium was built during Fr. Salvador's time, as were the chapel and the Jesuit Residence. The grade school was opened in 1962. In 1976, the Ateneo was accredited by the Philippine Accrediting Association of Schools, Colleges and Universities (PAASCU).

In 1967 the Diocese of San Pablo was erected, encompassing the entirety of Laguna province. The Jesuit administrators decided to return the Ateneo's buildings to the diocese after a request from the new bishop, Pedro Bantigue. However, following major protests against the act by faculty, students, and sympathizers, the deed of redonation was delayed. It took an order from the Apostolic Signatura, dated February 26, 1977, for the redonation to be enforced. As recompense, the diocese paid ₱850,000 for the continued improvement of the premises.

The redonation was formally agreed upon on June 15, 1977. The last graduates of the Ateneo received their diplomas on March 31, 1978, and the school was then reopened as the diocesan Liceo de San Pablo.

== School Rectors ==
- John W. McCarron, S.J. - 1946–47
- Paul V. Finster, S.J. - 1947–54
- Eusebio G. Salvador, S.J. - 1954–60
- Santiago A. Gaa, S.J. - 1960
- John F. Moran, S.J.
- Ramon Enojado, S.J.
- James P. Dunne, S.J.

== Alma Mater Song ==
Ateneo de San Pablo's alma mater song was Hail, Ateneo, Hail!, which is also used by other Jesuit institutions in the Philippines.

== School seal ==

The first is the official seal of the school. Ateneo de San Pablo's seal is different from the school seals of the other Ateneos which all have the shield of the family of St. Ignatius of Loyola.

== School colors and mascot ==
The school colors of Ateneo de San Pablo were purple and white, while its mascot was the Purple Panther.

== School publications ==
The newsmagazine of Ateneo de San Pablo was called the Ensign while the yearbook was called the Purple.

== See also ==
- List of Jesuit educational institutions
