= Sanata Dharma University =

University in Yogyakarta Indonesia

Coordinates: 7°46′32.17″S 110°23′21.91″E

- Universitas Sanata Dharma
- Latin: Universitas Sanata Dharma
- Former names: PTPG Sanata Dharma (1955-1958); FKIP Sanata Dharma (1958–1965); IKIP Sanata Dharma (1965-1993)
- Motto: Cerdas dan Humanis (Indonesian)
- Motto in English: Excellent and Humanist
- Type: Private, Catholic Research Coeducational higher education institution
- Established: October 20, 1955; 70 years ago
- Religious affiliation: Roman Catholic (Jesuit)
Academic affiliations
ACUCA AJCU-AP APTIK ASEACCU	AUN IAJBS IAJU
- Chairman: Cyprianus Kuntoro Adi, S.J.
- Rector: Albertus Bagus Laksana, S.J.
- Vice Rectors: List: Rohandi, Ph.D. (Vice Rector for Academic Affairs); Drs. Aufridus Atmadi (Vice Rector for Administration and Finance Affairs); Paulus Bambang Irawan, S.J. (Vice Rector for Student Affairs); F.X. Ouda Teda Ena (Vice Rector for Collaboration and Alumni Affairs)
- Academic staff: 300
- Undergraduates: 10,000
- Location: Jalan Affandi, Mrican, Yogyakarta, Indonesia
- Campus: Main campus - in Mrican Campus II - on Affandi St Campus III - in Paingan Campus IV - in Kentungan Campus V - in Kotabaru
- Colors: Red clay
- Website: www.usd.ac.id/en

Sanata Dharma University (Indonesian: Universitas Sanata Dharma) abbreviated as USD or Sandhar, is a private, Catholic, research, coeducational higher education institution run by the Indonesian Province of the Society of Jesus in Yogyakarta Indonesia. The two words, "Sanatana Dharma", come from the ancient Sanskrit language. "Sanatana" is a Sanskrit word that denotes that which is Anadi (beginningless), Anantha (endless) and does not cease to be, that which is eternal and everlasting. With its rich connotations, Dharma is not translatable to any other language. Dharma is from dhri, meaning to hold together, to sustain. Its approximate meaning is "Natural Law," or those principles of reality which are inherent in the very nature and design of the universe. Thus the term Sanatana Dharma can be roughly translated to mean "the natural, ancient and eternal way". The dedication is to the greater glory of God and the service is to humanity. Universitas Sanata Dharma has 8 undergraduate schools with 25 departments, along with 7 graduate programs, 1 professional program, and 3 certificate programs.

== History ==
=== PTPG Sanata Dharma era (1955–1958) ===
In 1955 Catholic missionaries of the religious order of the Society of Jesus in Central Java along with lay intellectuals decided to found a teacher training college. With the support of the Congregatio de Propaganda Fide, Father Kester, the superior of the Jesuit missionaries, united the diploma courses in Education under de Britto Foundation in Yogyakarta and in English under the Loyola Foundation in Semarang into a higher learning institution and so was born PTPG Sanata Dharma on October 20, 1955. At that time, Sanata Dharma had four departments: Education, English, History, and Natural Sciences. The superior of the Jesuit mission appointed Father Nicolaus Driyarkara as the dean and Father H. Loeff as the vice dean.

=== FKIP Sanata Dharma era (1958–1965) ===
In November 1958 Sanata Dharma was renamed FKIP Sanata Dharma (Faculty of Teacher Training and Education).

=== IKIP Sanata Dharma era (1965–1993) ===
In 1965 the Faculty was changed into IKIP Sanata Dharma (Sanata Dharma Institute of Teacher Training and Education). Since 1979 this institute has run both bachelor and diploma programs in mathematics, physics, Indonesian, English, and social science.

=== Universitas Sanata Dharma era (1993–present) ===
To meet the demands, needs and requirements of the community and the progress of science and technology, on April 20, 1993, IKIP Sanata Dharma was developed into Sanata Dharma University.

Currently the university works in collaboration with 158 domestic and 19 foreign institutions, and is listed by QS among top universities. It also participates in the Fulbright visiting scholar program with the USA.

== Rectors ==
- Rev. Nicolaus Drijarkara, S.J. (1955–1967)
- Rev. Josephus Ignatius G.M. Drost, S.J. (1968–1976)
- Rev. AM Kuylaars Kadarman, S.J. (1977–1984)
- Rev. F.X. Danuwinata, S.J. (1984–1988)
- A. Tutoyo (1988–1993)
- Rev. Michael Sastrapratedja, S.J. (1993–2001)
- Rev. Paulus Suparno, S.J. (2001–2006)
- Rev. Paulus Wiryono Priyotamtomo, S.J. (2006–2014)
- Yohanes Eka Priyatma, Ph.D (2013–Present)

== Undergraduate schools ==
- School of Teacher Training and Education
  - Department of Guidance and Counseling
  - Department of English Language Education
  - Department of Indonesian, Local Languages, & Literature Education
  - Department of Economics of Cooperatives Education
  - Department of Accounting Education
  - Department of History Education
  - Department of Mathematics Education
  - Department of Physics Education
  - Department of Catholic Religion Education
  - Department of Primary School Teacher Education (S1)
- School of Letters
  - Department of English Language and Literature
  - Department of History
  - Department of Indonesian Language and Literature
- School of Theology
- School of Economics
  - Department of Accounting
  - Department of Management
  - Department of Economics
- School of Psychology
- School of Mathematics and Natural Sciences
  - Department of Mathematics
  - Department of Physics
  - Department of Computer Sciences
- School of Engineering
  - Department of Electrical Engineering
  - Department of Informatics Technology
  - Department of Mechanical Engineering
  - Department of Mechatronics (3-year, diploma)
- School of Pharmacy
  - Department of Pharmacy
  - Pharmacist Profession Course

== Graduate programs ==
- English Studies
- English Language Education
- Indonesian Language and Literature Education
- Religious and Cultural Studies
- Theology
- Management
- Mathematics Education

== Certified programs ==
- English Extension Course
- Training for Interactive Communication in English (60-hour program)
- Indonesian Language and Culture Intensive Course

== See also ==
- List of Jesuit sites
