= Victor Dennis T. Nierva =

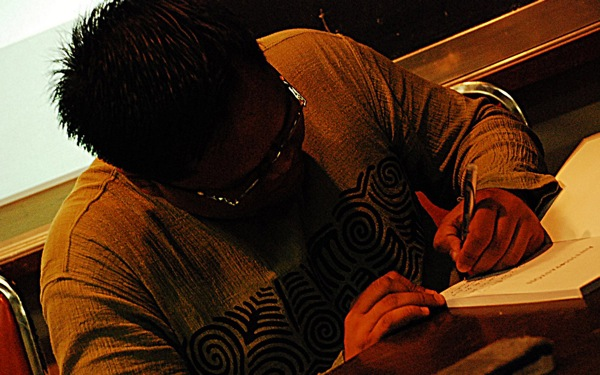
Vic Nierva signing a copy of 'Antisipasyon'

Victor Dennis T. Nierva (born 24 February 1980) is a poet, teacher, journalist, theatre actor, translator, graphic and book designer, and a cultural advocate. He is from the Bikol region of the Philippines.

== Early life ==
Nierva was born in Naga City. His father was Estelito Aguila Nierva, a railway official. His mother was Grace Pacay Tino, a teacher. His early education came in the central school of Lupi, a rural railroad town in the province of Camarines Sur. This lowly, riverine and hilly town appears in Nierva's poetry. In many literary gatherings he would admit that the town is one of his richest sources of poetic inspiration.

Nierva finished basic education in 1992 and entered Ateneo de Naga University (AdNU) for high school and college. In 2000, he earned his degree in Development Communication.

== Career ==
He became a faculty member of AdNU's Department of Media Studies. He works as a freelance writer, translator, and graphic and industrial designer. He is studying for Masters in Creative Writing at the University of the Philippines Diliman.

In 2007, his first book, Antisipasyon asin iba pang Rawitdawit sa Bikol asin Ingles (Anticipation and other Poems in Bikol and English), was published. He maintains a column entitled "Mayon Limited" in the online Bikol news hub, Vox Bikol.

Danton Remoto stated: "In less enlightened times, poetry was thought to have been written only in the metropolis, seen as the center of culture and taste. In the last ten years, regional publishing has begun to produce excellent books of literature. One of them is Antisipasyon asin iba pang Rawitdawit sa Bikol asin Ingles, written by Victor Dennis T. Nierva and published by Goldprint, Naga City. Images of the poet's Bicol Region are luxuriant in this book. They are memories, presences, and forebodings. But always, the poet's pen is restrained, the images and lines chiseled. This is a young poet's book, but some of the poems in this collection—whether in their original Bikol or translated into English—are already some of the best poems of his generation. For the lapidary quality of his poetry, the National Book Award for Poetry is given to Antisipasyon asin iba pang rawitdawit sa Bikol asin Ingles."

His second book, Doros asin mga Anghel (Translations in Bikol of John Donne's Holy Sonnets and Selected Works) was released by Ateneo de Naga University Press in January 2012.

== Recognition ==
=== Antisipasyon asin iba pang Rawitdawit sa Bikol asin Ingles ===
- Premio Tomas Arejola para sa Literaturang Bikol (2007)
- Philippine National Book Award for Poetry (2008) National Book Development Board and Manila Critics Circle
- Madrigal-Gonzalez Best First Book Award Finalist (2009)

=== Doros asin mga Anghel ===
- National Book Award for Best Translated Book (2013)
