= Loyola College of Culion =

Roman Catholic college in Palawan, Philippines

- Dalubhasaang Loyola ng Culion (Filipino)
- The Jesuit School in Northern Palawan.
- Former names: Culion Catholic Primary School (1936–1942); Culion Catholic School (1948–1955); St. Ignatius Academy (1955–1985); St. Ignatius College (1985–1988)
- Motto: Latin: Fortes in Fide
- Motto in English: Strong in Faith
- Type: Private Catholic non-profit coeducational secondary and higher education institution
- Established: 1936; 90 years ago
- Founders: Fr. Hugh J. McNulty, S.J.
- Accreditation: PEAC Participating School
- Religious affiliation: Catholic Church (Jesuit)
Academic affiliations
| JBEC; JHEC | CEAP; AJCU-AP |
- Chairman: Fr. Aristotle Dy, S.J.
- President: Fr. Neupito J. Saicon, Jr., S.J.
- Principal: Ms. Erika Therese Nuñez
- Registrar: Mrs. Emelyn Umpad
- Location: Barangay Libis, Culion, Palawan, Palawan, 5315, Philippines; 11°50′07″N 119°59′36″E
- Patron saint: St. Ignatius of Loyola
- Colors: Blue and White
- Sporting affiliations: Jesuit Athletic Meet
- Website: www.loyolacollegeofculion.edu.ph
- Location in the Philippines

Loyola College of Culion is a private, Catholic, Jesuit, secondary and higher education institution run by the Philippine Province of the Society of Jesus, in Culion, Palawan, Philippines. The school was opened by the Jesuits in 1936 for the purpose of having a school for the children of leprosy patients.

== History ==
=== Beginnings ===
In 1936, the Sisters of Saint Paul of Chartres were running the Hijas de Maria Dormitory for female lepers. Mother Superior Donatienne persuaded Jesuit Fr. Hugh J. McNulty to open an elementary school for the girls, originally in portions of their dormitory. The new school was opened in 1936, named the Culion Catholic School.

In June 1939, the Philippine government recognized the first private educational institution in Culion, Palawan: the Culion Catholic Primary School. With the outbreak of World War II, the school was forced to close in 1942. It reopened in 1947 as a coeducational grade school called the Culion Catholic School, remaining exclusively for children of those with leprosy.

=== Leper liberalization and further developments ===
Since its establishment, the school was accepting only children of leper patients. However, in 1950, a law was enacted that officially banned the discrimination of lepers, which led to the school finally opening its doors to all. With these developments, the school sought to identify what it is now for and what it hopes to achieve.

In 1952, Fr. Walter Hamilton, S.J., responding to an expressed need for secondary education, opened St. Ignatius High School for graduates of the grade school. After three years, Fr. Pedro Dimaano, S.J., decided to merge the two schools together into St. Ignatius Academy.

The desire of the Jesuits for the educational development and spiritual uplifting of the people in the area around Culion gave rise to the only private college in the area. In 1985, under Director Fr. John Chambers, S.J., the school initiated a Bachelor of Arts degree in Literature and it became known as St. Ignatius College. It would change its name once again in 1988 to current name, Loyola College of Culion.

=== Current situation ===
Although Culion had been declared leprosy-free since 2006, the stigma remains. The small municipality is poor and mostly dependent on fishing and farming. Loyola College of Culion continues to help finance education for Culion and its surrounding islands and municipalities. During the 2008–2009 school year, the college numbered 554 students (262 in grade school, 218 in high school, and 74 in college).

The school's survival depends on subsidies from various agencies, including the Society of Jesus and various agencies offering scholarships. Until May 2009, ANESVAD supplied 60% of the funding but that was discontinued and funds are being sought from other sources. The local government has been developing the area for tourism through the promotion of its beaches and diving prospects. It also is interested, through education, in protecting the people from abuse of their dignity and in preserving their heritage as a people.

In October 2015, the administrators, faculty, and staff of the school convened to re-think and eventually formulate its new vision and mission. Beginning school year 2016–2017, the Loyola College of Culion had a new vision and mission.

The College Department was closed in 2016 and the Senior High School program was also opened in 2016-2017. There are two SHS tracks, TVL and HUMMS.

== See also ==
- List of Jesuit sites
