= Karel San Juan =

Filipino priest (born 1965)

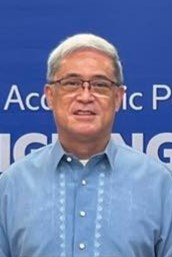
- San Juan in 2022

5th President of Ateneo de Davao University
- Incumbent
- Assumed office September 15, 2023
- Preceded by: Joel Tabora

4th President of Ateneo de Zamboanga University
- In office October 8, 2013 – February 28, 2023
- Preceded by: Tony Moreno
- Succeeded by: Guillrey Anthony Andal

Personal details
- Born: June 16, 1965 (age 61) Marikina, Rizal, Philippines
- Education: Ateneo de Manila University; Asian Institute of Management; Gonzaga University

Karel Santos San Juan, S.J. is a Filipino Jesuit priest who is the current president of the Catholic Educational Association of the Philippines. He also currently serves as the fifth president of Ateneo de Davao University, assuming office on September 14, 2023, and succeeding Fr. Joel Tabora. Prior to this, he was president of Ateneo de Zamboanga University.

== Early life and education ==
San Juan was born in Marikina, Philippines on June 16, 1965. He graduated with a Bachelor of Science in Mathematics degree from Ateneo de Manila University in March 1986. He earned his master's degree in Development Management from the Asian Institute of Management in Makati in May 1993. He finished his Doctorate in Leadership Studies at the Gonzaga University, in Spokane, Washington, USA in May 2007. He also obtained a Bachelor in Sacred Theology degree from Ateneo de Manila University in March 2010.

== Early career ==
San Juan started as an instructor and program officer for advocacy and social development offices in Ateneo de Manila University. He then expanded to being a consultant for strategic planning, development management, and organizational development for several government organizations in the Philippines including the Department of Environment and Natural Resources (1993 – 1994), Department of Trade and Industry (1993) and the Department of Agrarian Reform (1996 – 1997). In 1996, he taught management courses at the Asian Institute of Management.

== As a Jesuit ==
In May 1998, San Juan entered the Society of Jesus and was ordained to the priesthood in April 2010. He finished his tertianship in June 2013 and pronounced his final vows in February 2015. He was a delegate of the Philippine Province to the 36th Congregation of the Society of Jesus from October to November 2016 in Rome, Italy.

== As an educator ==
In 1996, San Juan was an assistant professor at the Asian Institute of Management, teaching in Development Management, Business Management, and Entrepreneurship. From 1997 to 1998, he was an instructor of the Ateneo de Manila University, teaching courses in Theology of Liberation and Development Studies. In June 2010 to September 2013, he was a faculty member in the PhD in Leadership Studies Program of the Ateneo de Manila University, teaching courses in foundations of Leadership Theory, and Ethics and Spirituality in Leadership.

The Ateneo de Zamboanga University Board of Trustees elected San Juan as the university's fourth president on February 23, 2013. As he was in his final year of Jesuit spiritual formation, he did not assume the presidency until October 8, 2013. He was officially installed President of the Ateneo de Zamboanga University on November 23, 2013. He is also a member of the Board of Trustees of Xavier University (Cagayan de Oro City), Ateneo de Davao University, Ateneo de Manila University and the Emmaus Center for Psycho-Spiritual Formation.

On November 12, 2022, the Ateneo de Davao University Board of Trustees elected San Juan as the university's fifth president. He assumed the presidency on September 15, 2023.

== As a professional ==
From 2000 to 2004, San Juan was a consultant and facilitator of the Ateneo de Manila University Office for Mission, Identity, and Organizational Development. He also became program officer for the Center for Ignatian Spirituality (CIS-Philippines), and Simbahang Lingkod ng Bayan (SLB) from 2000 to 2002, and he also served as Treasurer of the UGAT Foundation. He became executive director for the Emmaus Center for Psycho-Spiritual Formation in June 2007.
