= Polytechnic ATMI Surakarta =

Engineering academy in Surakarta, Indonesia

- Former names: Academy of Industrial Machine Engineering (1968-)
- Type: Private Roman Catholic Research Non-profit Coeducational Higher education institution
- Established: 1968; 58 years ago
- Religious affiliation: Roman Catholic (Jesuit)
- Academic affiliations: St. Michael Technical School, Surakarta
- Rector: T. Agus Sriyono, SJ
- Location: Surakarta, Central Java, Indonesia; 7°32′25.77″S 110°45′58.82″E
- Website: www.atmi.ac.id

Polytechnic ATMI Surakarta, formerly called Academy of Industrial Machine Engineering, Indonesia, is a mechanical engineering academy established in 1968 with support from the Karya Bakti Foundation of the Indonesian Jesuits. It has developed into a higher education institution with a considerable influence on professional education, especially in the mechanical engineering industry (manufacturing engineering). It is owned and managed by the Society of Jesus.

== Program ==
ATMI Polytechnic Surakarta is an institution of higher education which concentrates on vocational education in manufacturing in Indonesia, having adopted a dual system education model from Germany and Switzerland. The school was first established in 1968 under the name of ATMI (Akademi Tekniknik Mesin Industri) and has always been dedicated to Production Based Education and Training (PBET).

ATMI Polytechnic first received university level ISO quality certification in the education and production field. The ISO 9001: 2000 quality assurance has been obtained since September 21, 2001, and its implementation is audited annually. The standard update to ISO 9001: 2008 was implemented on May 18, 2010.

ATMI Surakarta has 3 study programs, namely: Industrial Machinery Engineering, and Mechatronics Engineering, Mechanical and Machine Design Technique.

== See also ==
- List of Jesuit sites
