= Liceo de San Pablo =

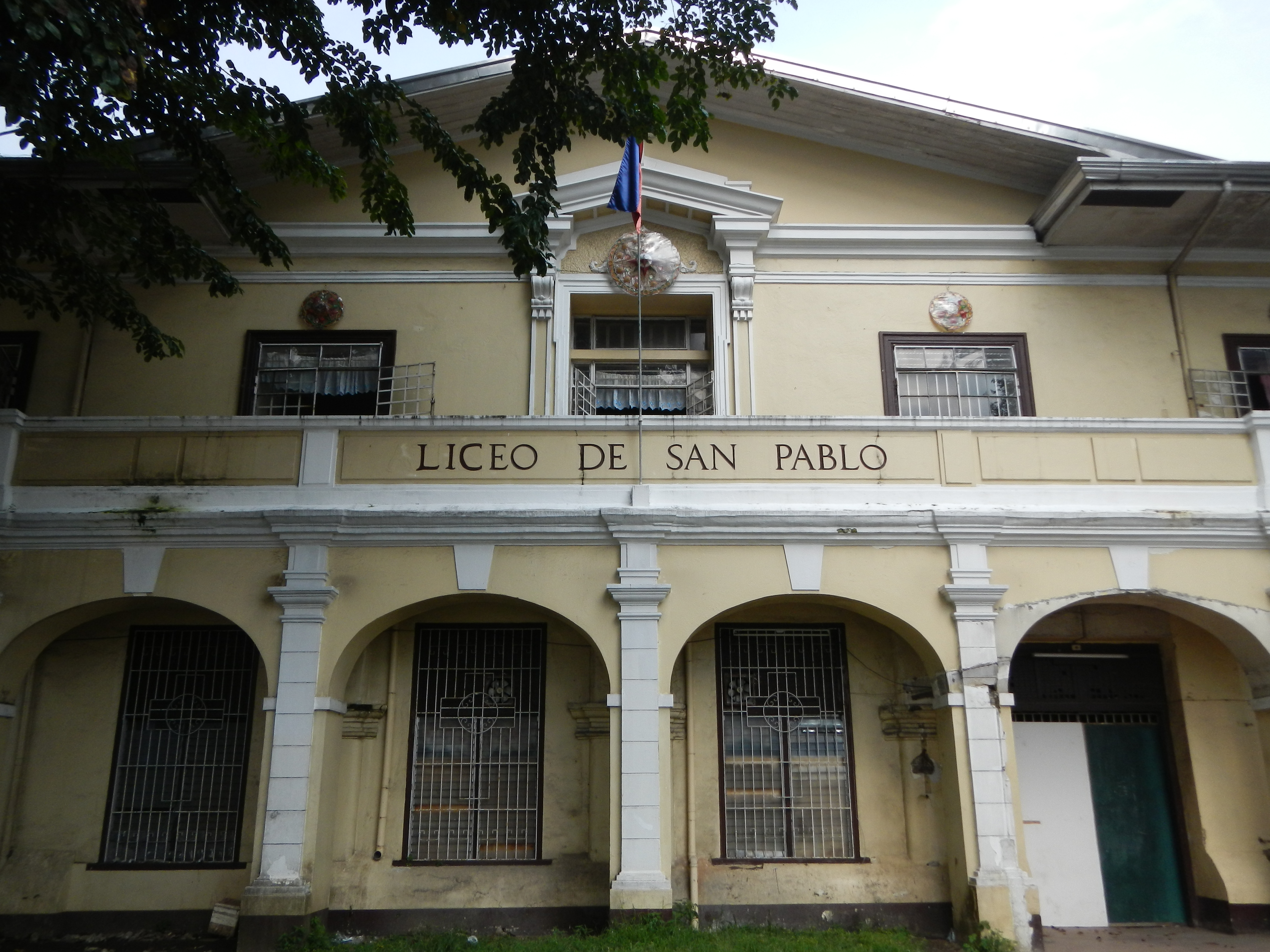
- Façade of Liceo de San Pablo
- Motto: Praefectura, Excellentia, Servitium
- Motto in English: Leadership - Excellence - Service
- Type: Private Roman Catholic; Basic education institution
- Established: 1978; 48 years ago
- Founders: Catholic Diocese of San Pablo
- Religious affiliation: Roman Catholic (Diocese of San Pablo)
- Academic affiliations: PAASCU
- Principal: Donna S. Montejo
- School chaplain: Rev. Msgr. Jerry V. Bitoon
- Location: Marcos Paulino St. Brgy Poblacion, San Pablo City, Laguna, Philippines; 14°4′0″N 121°20′0″E
- Campus: Urban
- Patroness: Blessed Virgin Mary
- School registrar: Minonette Rivera
- Nickname: Liceans
- Website: https://msc.edu.ph/localcyber2008/LDSP/home.html

Liceo de San Pablo (LDSP), formerly Ateneo de San Pablo, is a private, Catholic basic education institution run by the Catholic Diocese of San Pablo in San Pablo City, Laguna, Philippines

== History ==
In 1967, the Diocese of San Pablo was created, separate from the Lipa Diocese. The diocesan officials thought it logical that the site for the seminary and diocesan curia be in San Pablo. After the creation of the diocese, the newly appointed bishop, Pedro N. Bantigue, asked the Society of Jesus to re-donate the Ateneo building site to the diocese. The Jesuits agreed to execute a deed of redonation and the signing of the deed was scheduled on March 11, 1969. The Ateneans and many sympathizers staged rallies and demonstrations to prevent the signing of the contract and they succeeded.

The following year, the Ateneo de San Pablo was again threatened by the same case of 1969. On February 26, 1977, the Rome Supreme Tribunal ordered the Jesuits to comply with the redonation agreement made previously with Bantigue. The signing of the contract was rescheduled for June 15, 1977. In April of the same year, the Jesuits received a letter from Rome explaining the order for the Jesuits to leave the Ateneo site and informing them that Bantigue would pay P850,000.00 as compensation for the improvements made by them on the site.

The Ateneo community tried to prevent the signing of the deed but to no avail this time. The deed was signed and the ownership of the land and the buildings of the Ateneo was transferred to the diocese. The twenty-eighth and last graduation day in the Ateneo de San Pablo was held on March 31, 1978, marking the end of a beloved institution. The Ateneo de San Pablo became the Liceo de San Pablo, a parochial school of the diocese.
