= Ateneo de Davao University =

Roman Catholic university in Davao City, Philippines

- Pamantasang Ateneo de Davao (Filipino)
- Seal
- Former names: St. Peter's Parochial School; Ateneo de Davao (1948–1976)
- Motto: Latin: Fortes in Fide
- Motto in English: Strong in Faith
- Type: Private Catholic Research Non-profit Coeducational Basic and Higher education institution
- Established: May 20, 1948; 78 years ago
- Founder: Society of Jesus
- Religious affiliation: Roman Catholic (Jesuits)
Academic affiliations
AJCU-AP PAASCU UMAP ASEACCU CEAP	COCOPEA DACS; JBEC; FAAP
- Chairman: Benjamin A. Lizada
- President: Fr. Karel San Juan
- Vice-president: List: Jeremy S. Eliab (Executive Vice President); Gina L. Montalan, Ph.D. (VP for Academics); Suzette D. Aliño (VP for Quality Assurance and Planning); Jimmy E. Delgado, CPA (VP for Finance)
- Principal: Excesima L. Pasilan (Junior High School)
- Director: List: Dr. Joan Grace A. Palconit (Senior High School); Fr. Jessel Gerard "JBoy" Gonzales, SJ (Ignatian Spirituality and Formation Office); Fr. Carlos "Charlie" Cenzon, SJ (University Information Technology Office); Fr. Victor A. Baltazar, SJ (St. Ignatius Spirituality Center)
- Principal: Annierose V. Villarba (Grade School)
- Faculty: 840 (1,665 full-time & 175 part-time)
- Administrative staff: 400
- Students: 3,900 (Grade School); 4,800 (Junior High School and Senior High School)
- Undergraduates: 21,400 (College)
- Postgraduates: 1,600 (Graduate School)
- Location: Emilio Jacinto Street; Davao City, Davao del Sur, Philippines; 7°4′20″N 125°36′47″E
- Campus: Urban; Main 4 hectares (40,000 m^{2}) Emilio Jacinto St., Davao City (Undergraduate/Graduate & Professional Schools); Satellite * Matina Campus 7.2 hectares (72,000 m^{2}) Acacia St., Matina Crossing, Davao City (Grade School and Junior High School) * Bangkal Campus 5 hectares (50,000 m^{2}) Km. 8, McArthur Highway, Talomo Proper, Davao City (Senior High School)
- Patron saints: Blessed Virgin Mary (Under the title Our Lady of Assumption); St. Ignatius of Loyola
- Alma Mater Song: "Blue Knight Song"
- Colors: Blue and White
- Sporting affiliations: UNIGAMES DACS DCL; DBL DCCL
- Mascot: Blue Knight
- Student Publication: Atenews
- Website: www.addu.edu.ph
- Location in Mindanao Location in the Philippines

The Ateneo de Davao University (AdDU; Filipino: Pamantasang Ateneo de Davao) is a private Catholic basic and higher education institution in Davao City, Davao del Sur, Philippines. It is run by the Philippine Jesuit Province.

The university has five undergraduate schools: the School of Arts and Sciences, the School of Business and Governance, the School of Engineering and Architecture, the School of Education, and the School of Nursing. The aforementioned schools also run the graduate programs. The College of Law is a separate unit within the university.

The university also runs a grade school and both a junior high and senior high school.

The university was granted "Institutional Accreditation" by the Philippine Accrediting Association of Schools, Colleges, and Universities, an honour only granted to six universities. It also received an autonomous status from the Philippine Commission on Higher Education.

== History ==
Before the Jesuits assumed administration of the school in 1948, it was known as St. Peter's Parochial School. After taking over, the Jesuits renamed the institution Ateneo de Davao, following their tradition at the time of naming Jesuit-run schools "Ateneo" (Spanish for "academy" or "learned society"). The Ateneo de Davao is one of nine schools in the Philippines bearing the Ateneo name.

At the request of Bishop Luis del Rosario of the Archdiocese of Zamboanga, which then included the Davao region, fellow Jesuit priests assumed control of the existing St. Peter's Parochial School and founded the Ateneo de Davao in 1948. Theodore E. Daigler, one of the priests, served as the first rector of the school.

When the school opened on June 28, 1948, it enrolled students from the fifth grade through the third year of high school. There were 71 elementary students and 131 high school students who started in a wooden building on a six-hectare lot in Matina.

The Jacinto campus (3.5 hectares) was acquired in 1951 with the support of the Most Rev. Clovis Thibault, P.M.E., Bishop-Prelate of Davao. The campus provided classrooms for high school students in the daytime and college courses in the evenings. College course offerings then were liberal arts, commerce, education, associate in arts, pre-law, secretarial and an elementary teacher's certificate program. The College Department opened in July 1951 with 130 male students. College classes were held in the wooden Bellarmine Hall. In 1953, the Ateneo de Davao College became co-educational. By that time, there were nine collegiate course programs offered.

The Ateneo de Davao became one of the centers of student activism in Mindanao during the period of martial law under Ferdinand Marcos. Some people would later be added to the Philippines' Bantayog ng mga Bayani Wall of Remembrance, which honors victims of the resistance against the authoritarian government of Ferdinand Marcos.

== University campuses ==
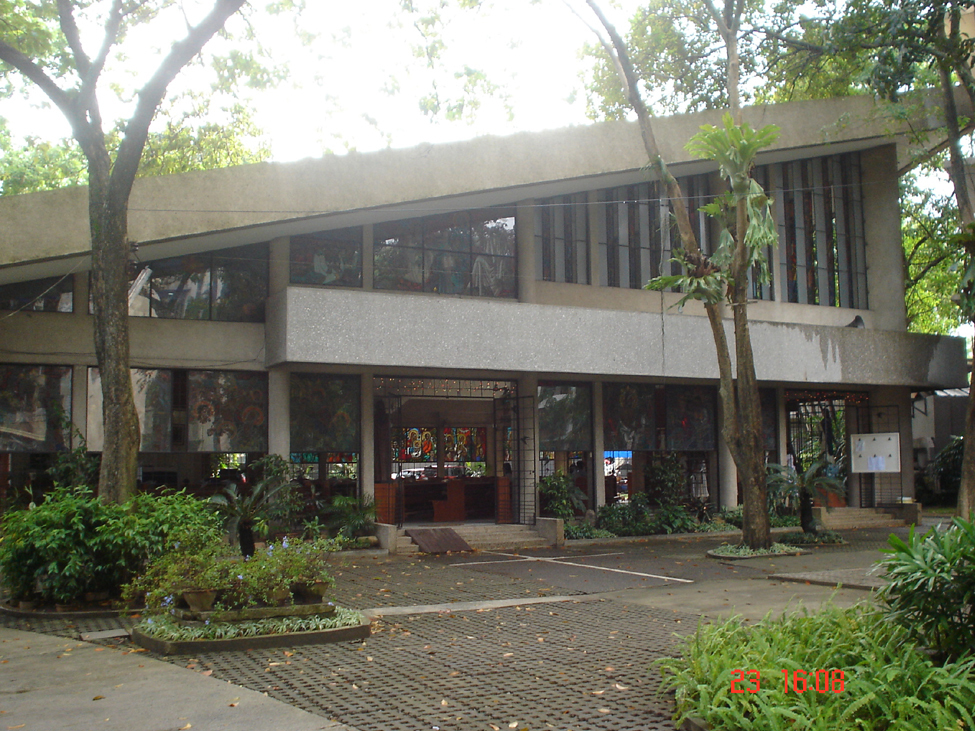
University Chapel

Ateneo de Davao University operates three main campuses in Davao City: the Emilio Jacinto Street campus, the Matina campus, and the Bangkal campus, each supporting specific academic and research units. The 4-hectare Emilio Jacinto Street campus, located in Davao City's central business district, was acquired in 1951 and initially measured approximately 3.5 hectares. In 2012, an adjacent 5,000 square meter lot (0.5 hectare) was added to the existing campus. The undergraduate and graduate schools, and the College of Law, are housed in this campus and have a combined student population of around 8,000.

The grade school and high school units are located in a 7.2-hectare campus in the Matina district, a residential area south of the downtown district. The Matina campus was originally a 6-hectare lot, and an adjacent 1.2 hectare lot was added to the campus in 2012. In June 2018, the Senior High School opened in the Bangkal district. At four hectares, this campus features four school buildings and one administration building with 4 stories each.

== Academic institutions ==
Finster Hall

The Ateneo de Davao's academic programs include the humanities, education, accounting, business, law, social sciences, philosophy, nursing, social work, theology, biology, chemistry, mathematics, environmental science, computer science and information technology, engineering, architecture, public administration, anthropology, Islamic studies, sociology, economics, and political science. The university also heavily engages itself in research and community social involvement.

=== Undergraduate and graduate units ===
==== School of Arts and Sciences ====
The School of Arts and Sciences (SAS) was opened in 1951 with 130 students enrolled in various offerings, namely: liberal arts, commerce, education, associate in arts, pre-law, secretarial, and elementary teacher's certificate program. In subsequent years, other college programs were added. After the school obtained university status in 1977, the list of programs was further expanded.

Currently, the SAS offers different degree programs both at the undergraduate and graduate levels. The SAS is subdivided into four clusters: Computer Studies, Humanities and Letters, Natural Sciences and Mathematics, and Social Sciences.

==== School of Business and Governance ====
At Ateneo de Davao University, business programs were once spread across several units. Undergraduate offerings were handled by the School of Arts and Sciences, while graduate programs such as the Master of Business Administration, Master of Public Administration and Master in Administration and Management were administered separately. The Master of Public Administration in Governance and Administration program was housed under the Graduate School of Arts and Sciences.

To bring these programs together, the university created the School of Business and Governance (SBG), which was launched on April 1, 2000.

It offers programs in accountancy, business management, entrepreneurship, human resource development and management, finance, accounting technology and marketing, along with graduate business programs. The school also oversees support units in computer literacy and research and extension services.

==== School of Nursing ====
The university began offering a master's degree program in Nursing Administration in the 1970s. It opened an undergraduate nursing program in 2001. The program started under the auspices of the Natural Sciences and Math Division, and eventually became the School of Nursing (SON).

In 2009, the Commission on Higher Education (CHEd) released a list of the top 20 nursing schools in the Philippines that have met the standards set by the Professional Regulation Commission (PRC). The School of Nursing of the Ateneo de Davao University was in the 18th place of the Top 20 Nursing Schools in the Philippines.

==== School of Engineering and Architecture ====
In school year 2010–2011, the Board of Trustees approved the separation of the Engineering and Architecture divisions from the School of Arts and Sciences, and the creation of its own college. Randell U. Espina was appointed as its first dean. The board approved the shift from CEA to School of Engineering and Architecture (SEA), beginning June 1, 2012.

Currently, SEA offers ten programs: Architecture, Aerospace Engineering, Civil Engineering, Computer Engineering, Chemical Engineering, Electronics and Communications Engineering, Electrical Engineering, Industrial Engineering, Mechanical Engineering, and Robotics Engineering.

In 2011, AdDU was ranked seventh among the country's engineering schools.This ranking was derived from the average of the school's ratings in the licensure examinations in the five engineering fields of Electrical, Mechanical, Chemical, Civil and Electronics & Communications Engineering. The Ateneo de Davao was also ranked as the 4th best Architecture school in the country. This was also based on the passing percentage rates of the school on board examinations administered by the Professional Regulation Commission for Architecture in three consecutive years.

==== School of Education ====
During the school year 2012–2013, the board approved the separation of the Education program from the Social Science Division as part of the reorganization of the School of Arts and Sciences in order to create the School of Education (SOE). Gina L. Montalan is the school's first appointed dean. The current dean of the SOE is Annabel J. Casumpa.

The SOE offers the following programs: Bachelor of Elementary Education (Generalist and Pre-School) and Bachelor of Secondary Education with majors in English, math, physical sciences, social studies, and biological sciences.

The Ateneo de Davao University's Teacher Education is also recognized by the Commission on Higher Education as a Center of Development.

=== Professional unit ===
==== College of Law ====
In June 1961, then-Rector Rev. Hudson Mitchell, S.J. established the College of Law. The first graduates took the bar examinations in 1965. Atty. Leon M. Garcia Jr. was Dean for the period 1961–63. He was succeeded by Epifanio Estrellado who held the deanship for 27 years. In 1990, Atty. Hildegardo F. Iñigo, one of the first graduates of the College of Law and faculty member since 1967, assumed the position of dean.

According to the Supreme Court of the Philippines, the AdDU College of Law is the fifth-best law school in the country.

The present dean of the College of Law is Atty. Manuel P. Quibod, who is also the university's legal counsel.

=== Basic education units ===
The government mandated K12 basic education program was implemented in the university starting in school year 2012–2013.

==== Senior High School ====
The Senior High School covers three areas based on disciplines similar to college courses which are all Academic: Accountancy, Business & Management (ABM), Science Technology Engineering & Mathematics (STEM), and Humanities & Social Sciences (HUMSS). These areas allow students to choose the strand where they can prepare for college.

The first two school years of the Senior High School which began in June 2016, was temporarily held in the college campus in Jacinto while the permanent and current site was being constructed in Bangkal. In June 2018, with the new campus 90% complete, formal classes were already held in this new location.

The SHS is headed by the Principal, Dr. Joan Grace A. Palconit. Its Assistant Principal for Formation is Fr. Jessel Gerard "JBoy" M. Gonzales, SJ.

==== Junior high school ====
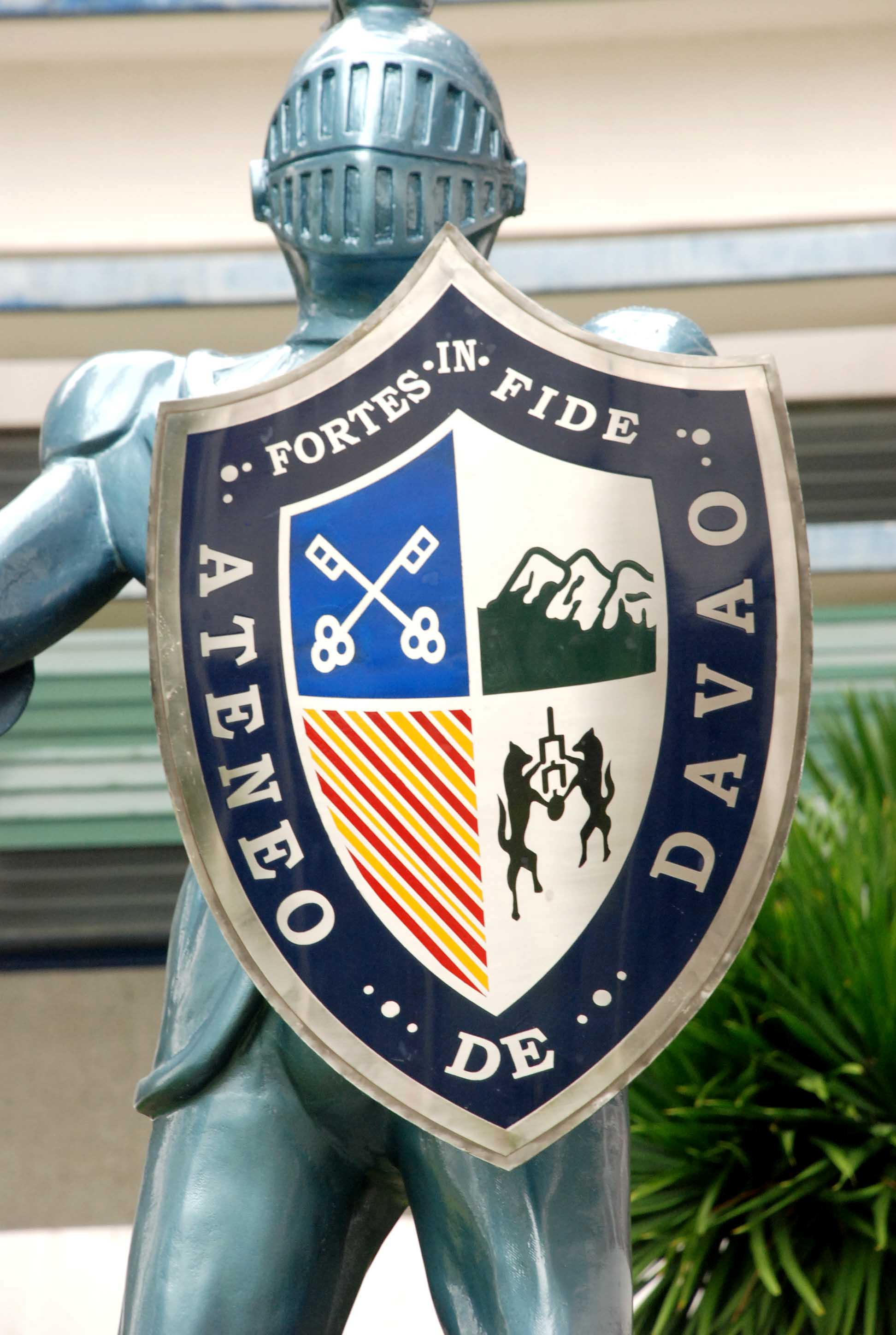
Blue Knight Statue

The Junior High School (JHS) Unit's incumbent principal Camila V. Samblaceño assumed the post on April 1, 2020, replacing Fr. Michael I. Pineda, S.J. after his nine years of service in the campus.

As part of the Jesuit educational tradition, the JHS also provides religious formation programs, such as the Christian Service and Learning Program (CSLP, formerly called CSIP), by sending its students to other communities in order to immerse themselves in the environment. The academic curriculum also includes a Christian Life Education (CLE) program. CLE courses, which are spread over four years, aim to produce Ateneo graduates who embody the Jesuit values.

The JHS classifies its students into honors (St. Francis Xavier) and general sections (St. John Berchmans – general section in 7th, 9th and 10th Grade and honors class in the 8th Grade, St. Robert Bellarmine, St. Francis Borgia, St. Peter Canisius, St. Edmund Campion, St. Noel Chabanel (7th Grade), St. Peter Favre, St. Aloysius Gonzaga, St. Isaac Jogues, St. Stanislaus Kostka, St. Joseph Pignatelli, St. John Francis Regis). Students entering the 7th Grade are all placed in regular sections. Starting with the 8th Grade, they are academically evaluated and ranked in order to determine the composition of the batch's honors class. The latter's curriculum is more advanced and rigorous. For instance, the math curriculum of the honors class has additional competencies such as analytic geometry (8th Grade), trigonometry (9th Grade), and calculus (10th Grade).

==== Grade School ====
The Ateneo de Davao Grade School is housed, along with the Junior high school in the Matina Campus. The grade school's Wellness and Testing Center (WTC, formerly SDC or Student Development Center) offers integral student development programs. The Instructional Media Center (IMC) is the information center of the Grade School. The Ateneo Education for Elementary Gifted Student (Ateneo EDGES) Program caters to pupils who are gifted in English, Science, and Math.

== Library system ==
The library system of the Ateneo de Davao University comprises several libraries housed in the 3 campuses. The main library of the tertiary level is located in Gisbert Hall, in the Jacinto Campus. The main library has four levels and mainly serves the School of Arts and Sciences, School of Business and Governance, and the College of Nursing. The first level of the main library accommodates the space for the study area, newly processed books, general circulation books, CD-ROM library, PROQUEST, and the Online Public Access Catalog (OPAC). The second level contains the Union Card Catalog and the Graduate and Reserved Sections which contain theses, dissertations, and other studies that are requested by the members of the faculty for their classes. The third level includes the Reference and Filipiniana Library and a self-regulating computer library for the students. The fourth level houses the Periodical Library which provides a vast collection of current and retrospective newspapers, magazines, and journals.

The Law School and School of Business and Governance Graduate Library is located on the fifth floor of the Dotterweich building. Its collection largely caters to law students and graduate students who are enrolled in the Master of Arts in Business Administration (MBA), Master in Public Administration (MPA) and Doctor in Business Administration (DBA) programs.

The Faculty Resource Center (FRC) is located on the second level of Finster Hall. The resources in the FRC are exclusively used by the faculty members of the university. It also contains its own computer laboratory.

Also integrated in the library system of the university are the respective libraries of the pre-school, grade school, and high school departments. All located in the Matina Campus. The Library System is also connected to those of its sister schools all over the country, namely the Ateneo de Manila University, the Ateneo de Naga University, the Ateneo de Zamboanga University, and the Ateneo de Cagayan University.

=== American Studies Resource Center ===
The American Studies Resource Center or the American Corner (AC) is a center dedicated to providing various materials and resources about the United States in various aspects, as well as advising services for those individuals who wish to study in the United States.

== Service-oriented programs ==
The Arrupe Office of Social Formation, formerly known as the Social Involvement Coordinating Office, oversees community engagement and social development programs at the university level of Ateneo de Davao University. The office coordinates activities involving students, faculty and non-teaching staff, including outreach initiatives, community immersions and social development activities, in keeping with the university's Jesuit educational framework.

Among the programs administered by the Arrupe Office of Social Formation are the First Year Development Program, which assigns first-year students to advisers who support their transition to college life; the National Service Training Program, which involves students in community-based activities with partner communities; and the Student Servant Leadership Program, which works with student organizations to promote civic awareness and social involvement. The office has also conducted public interest surveys and participated in election monitoring activitiess.

The College of Law offers pro bono services through Ateneo Legal Aid Services. Graduate students in the School of Business and Governance assist non-profit organizations by helping develop business plans and entrepreneurial projects. In the School of Arts and Sciences, many graduate-level courses focus on areas such as environmental studies, education and peace studies. The university also operates the Al Qalam Institute for Islamic Studies.

== Accreditation and recognition ==
In 2009, the Ateneo de Davao was granted "institutional accreditation" by the Philippine Accrediting Association of Schools, Colleges and Universities (PAASCU). It is the only university in Mindanao to have been given such recognition, and one of only six in the Philippines, namely the Ateneo de Manila University, the Ateneo de Naga University, Centro Escolar University, Silliman University, and the Trinity University of Asia. AdDU was also given Autonomous Status by the Commission on Higher Education and is also a Center of Development for Information Technology and Teacher Education.

The Ateneo de Davao University has been re-accredited Level III in eight programs: Accounting, Arts & Sciences, Business, Electronics & Communication Engineering, Elementary Education, Secondary Education, Civil Engineering, and Chemical Engineering, and is accredited Level III for Industrial Engineering, Electrical Engineering, Mechanical Engineering and Computer Science by the Philippine Accrediting Association of Schools, Colleges and Universities and the Federation of Accrediting Agencies of the Philippines. The Information Technology and Information Systems programs of AdDU were both granted Level I accreditation and is a Center of Development of CHED XI. Certificates of Accreditation from PAASCU were also awarded to the following programs offered by the Ateneo: Arts & Sciences, Elementary Education, Secondary Education, Business, Accounting, Engineering (Civil, Chemical, Electrical, Mechanical), Information Technology/Information Systems and Social Work. Some programs offered by the university are also under the Candidate Status of PAASCU.

== Rankings ==
University rankings

Regional – Overall
- QS Asia: 551–600 (2023)

- The Ateneo de Davao University was the fifth-best university in the Philippines according to the 2023 Quacquarelli-Symonds (QS) Philippine University Ranking. It ranked 557th out of 760 Asian universities in the Asian region, according to the 2023 Quacquarelli-Symonds (QS) Asia University Ranking.
- The Ateneo got into the list of the QS World University Rankings for 2013 per subject area in Higher Education Institutions in the country. AdDU topped in four subject areas in the QS ranking, specifically in Arts & Humanities: English Language and Literature, Engineering & Technology: Computer Science and Information Systems, Psychology and Sociology, joining other universities in the country namely the Ateneo de Manila University, the University of the Philippines, De La Salle University, the University of Santo Tomas and Mindanao State University – Iligan Institute of Technology.
- The Ateneo de Davao joined the roster of world universities in the 2012 QS World University Subject Ranking for English Language and Literature, wherein it landed on the 101–150 bracket. It was not on the equivalent 2016 list.
- In the national rankings done by the Commission on Higher Education and the Professional Regulation Commission based on cumulative data from 1991 to 2001 of average passing rates in all courses of all Philippine colleges and universities in licensure examinations, the Ateneo de Davao University was proclaimed as the 5th top university in the country.
- On a review and ranking by the uniRank.org – an international higher education directory and search engine which reviews accredited world universities and colleges, which was updated in 2014, the Ateneo de Davao University got the 14th spot in the list of Top Universities in the Philippines. The ranking is not academic, rather, it is based upon an algorithm including three unbiased and independent web metrics extracted from three different search engines. The significance of such ranking according to uniRank is to help international students and academic staff to understand how popular a specific university or college is in a foreign country.
- Based on the research and web survey of the Webometrics Ranking of World Universities 2014 – produced by Cybermetrics Lab (CCHS), a unit of the Spanish National Research Council (CSIC), the main public research body in Spain, the Ateneo de Davao landed on the 14th spot in the list of the top universities in the Philippines.
- On a local survey of Davao Reader, a Davao City Online Magazine, the Ateneo de Davao is the top school in the city and is the most preferred school by company heads and owners in getting personnel and professionals to work for their companies. In another evaluation done by Davao Eagle Online, AdDU also emerged as the top school in Davao City. This ranking was based on the number of PRC board topnotchers in 2013.

=== University radio station ===
Blue Knight FM, the official radio station of the university, was launched in January 2008.

In the mid-2010s, the university launched its own weekday morning program, "Ateneo Voices", which currently airs on 89.9 Spirit FM.

== Notable alumni ==
The Ateneo de Davao has produced graduates in the fields of arts, governance, law, medicine, media, service and science:

- Ernesto Abella – businessman, writer, and former evangelist serving as Undersecretary for Strategic Communications and Research of the Department of Foreign Affairs since 2017
- Carlos Dominguez III – Secretary of Natural Resources and of Agriculture (1986–1987), chair, Philippine Airlines (1993–1995) and Secretary of Finance (2016–2022)
- Joey Ayala – singer, songwriter and former chairman of the music committee of the National Commission for Culture and the Arts.
- Antonio Carpio – Senior Associate Justice, Supreme Court of the Philippines
- Leoncio P. Deriada – writer
- Thor – a singer-songwriter and vocal coach
- Jesus Dureza – lawyer, consultant, journalist and politician
- Sebastian Duterte – politician and mayor of Davao City
- Juris Fernandez – singer
- Chokoleit – comedian, actor and TV host
- Conrado Gempesaw – 17th and 1st lay president of St. John's University in Queens, New York City
- Henri Jean Paul Inting – the 183rd Associate Justice of the Supreme Court of the Philippines
- Jasmine Bacurnay Lee – Filipino-born Korean television personality, actress, civil servant and politician
- Emmylou Taliño-Mendoza – politician
- Prospero Nograles – former Speaker of the Philippine House of Representatives
- Karlo Alexei Nograles – chair, Civil Service Commission, former Secretary to the Cabinet, former Representative, 1st District of Davao City
- Norberto Gonzales – former National Security Adviser and Secretary of National Defense
- Janelle Tee – model, actress, TV host, and beauty pageant titleholder (Miss Philippines Earth 2019).
- Rene Baterbonia – basketball player

== See also ==
- List of Jesuit educational institutions in the Philippines
- List of Jesuit sites
