= Ateneo de Naga University =

Roman Catholic university in Camarines Sur, Philippines

- Unibersidad kan Ateneo sa Naga (Central Bikol); Pamantasang Ateneo de Naga (Filipino)
- Former names: Camarines Sur Catholic Academy (1935–1939); Ateneo de Naga (1940–1998)
- Motto: Latin: Primum Regnum Dei
- Motto in English: First, the Kingdom of God
- Type: Private Roman Catholic Research Non-profit Coeducational Basic and Higher education institution
- Established: May 2, 1940; 86 years ago
- Founder: Society of Jesus
- Religious affiliation: Roman Catholic; (Jesuits)
Academic affiliations
PAASCU AJCU-AP CEAP	JBEC; FAAP ASEACCU COCOPEA
- Chairman: Atty. Avelino Sales, Jr.
- President: Fr. Aristotle C. Dy, SJ
- Vice-president: Digna P. Alba, PhD (VP for Higher Education); Lydia T. Goingo (VP for Basic Education)
- Dean: List: Ma. Filipinas H. Bana, PhD (College of Humanities & Social Sciences); Dr. Anne Marie F. Bagadion (College of Business & Accountancy); Joshua C. Martinez ( College of Computer Studies); Engr. Referendo Soriano ( College of Science, Engineering, and Architecture); Dr. Maria Luz Badiola ( College of Education); Dr. Delia B. Oco ( College of Nursing); Dr. Malu C. Barcillano (Graduate School)
- Principal: List: Fr. Stephen Abuan, SJ (Senior High School); Fr. Martin Licup, SJ (Junior High School); Ms. Ma. Jeanette Naval (Grade School)
- Faculty: 377
- Administrative staff: 306
- Students: 186 (Grade School); 1,500 (High School); 6,000 (Undergraduates); 7,686 Total
- Location: Ateneo Avenue, Bagumbayan Sur, Naga City, Camarines Sur, Philippines; 13°37′51″N 123°11′04″E
- Campus: Urban; Main Bagumbayan Campus Bagumbayan Sur, Naga City (College); Satellite Bonoan Campus 10 hectares (100,000 m^{2}) Brgy Pacol, Naga City (Pre School, Grade School & High School)
- Newspaper: The Pillars Publication
- Patron Saint: St. Francis Xavier; Blessed Virgin Mary (under the title of our Lady of Peñafrancia)
- Colors: Blue and Gold
- Nickname: Ateneans
- Sporting affiliations: Naga City Charter Inter-Collegiate Basketball League; CEACAL BUCAL
- Mascot: Golden Knights
- Website: www.adnu.edu.ph
- Location in Luzon Location in the Philippines

The Ateneo de Naga University (Central Bikol: Unibersidad kan Ateneo sa Naga) and (Filipino: Pamantasang Ateneo de Naga) also referred to by its acronym AdNU, is a private Catholic Jesuit basic and higher education institution run by the Philippine Province of the Society of Jesus in Naga City, Camarines Sur, Philippines. It was established in 1940 when the Jesuits took over the administration of the diocesan school, Camarines Sur Catholic Academy. The Jesuits renamed the school Ateneo de Naga after taking control. The Jesuits were naming all the schools that they were opening at that time Ateneo (Spanish for "academy" or "learned society"). The Ateneo de Naga was the fourth school named Ateneo by the Jesuits. Typical of universities in the Philippines, AdNU has primary (since 2014) and secondary departments, which are both coeducational.

== History ==
=== Pre-war ===
The Ateneo de Naga University was established in 1940 when American Jesuits took over the Camarines Sur Catholic Academy, a small private school under the supervision of the Diocese of Nueva Caceres, at the invitation of Bishop (later Archbishop) Pedro P. Santos of Caceres. Classes formally started in June 1940 at the building formerly used by the Camarines Sur Catholic Academy (now Naga Parochial School) with 650 elementary and high school students. Meanwhile, Msgr. Santos initiated the construction of the Jesuit faculty house and the now iconic Ateneo de Naga building with the four pillars.

=== Wartime ===
On 14 December, the Imperial Japanese Army's 16th Division "Kimura Detachment" entered Naga. Then, on the 15th, this spearhead walked directly through the gates of the Ateneo de Naga during its turnover ceremony, postponing it indefinitely. The campus' monks were then subsequently incarcerated by the Japanese, then intending to encamp their regional garrison at this institution. Many of the facilities of the campus were requisitioned by the garrison, notably with the Jesuit House becoming the garrisons' officer quarters.

According to a recount by Scholastic McSorley where the eight American Jesuits, himself, Fathers Francis Burns, Joe Bittner, Mat Reilly, and Scholastics Ed Sullivan, Albert Grau, John Nicholson, and Gregory Horgan were interned at the Naga Provincial Jail. From the ALATCO bus where they were transported, Atenean students were reportedly waving at them while the Japanese guards at the back held their rifles against the monks. They were permitted to individually carry a single briefcase containing all their personal belongings before being confined in the city jail. Manila-based Jesuits who heard their arrest grew adamant of their release, with the Superior of the Jesuits sending Fr. Horacio de la Costa and Guzman Rivas and a Japanese priest to interpose their release. On 7 March, these Jesuits were transferred to the Bishop's residency. After two weeks of rest, they were brought to the Ateneo de Manila at Padre Faura and finally to Los Baños Internment Camp where they were kept throughout the war.

After instating acquisition policy, the bulk of the 16th Division sent for the north to assist the Battle of Manila, facing light resistance at Tayabas to regroup with the latter regiment at Atimonan. Throughout the war, the Ateneo de Naga would be the IJA's base of operations in Bicol, headed by Col. Susumu Takechi, who perished in the infamous Battle of Taguilid Pass on 8 November 1942 from attacking guerillas. The campus however would gain a notorious moniker by the locals of being the "Fort Santiago of Camarines Sur." Callous executions and tortures occurred throughout the campus at night and every day, being carried out by the Kempeitai, known notoriously for their brutal interrogation tactics. Accounts testified suspected guerillas being rounded up and being interned by fierce Japanese confiners, among them being the fate of brothers Sindac and Felito Tuzon. Local personalities such as Francisco Celebrado and Dr. Manubay also experienced this harsh treatment. According to one survivor of the Ateneo camp, Celebrado was "made to swing like a pendulum," with his thumbs tied to a rope suspending from the ceiling in one of the classrooms in the Ateneo de Naga. Dr. Manubay was detained when Japanese guards nearby saw him waving to passing American planes, then never being seen again.

During its first year of operation, it included intermediate grades 4 to 6 in elementary school. In terms of education, the Japanese barred the usage of English textbooks at the Ateneo, strictly enforcing the study of Nippongo and a few key components of Japanese-based curricula. In 1941, however, the elementary school students were transferred to the nearby school run by the Daughters of Charity, and the Ateneo became an all-boys high school.

=== Post-war ===
The college department opened on June 5, 1947, and admitted its first female students on October 26, 1953.

=== University status ===
On September 16, 1996, the university president, Fr. Raul J. Bonoan, SJ issued a memorandum directing the separation of the various colleges: the College of Arts and Sciences, the College of Commerce, and the College of Information Technology and Engineering. Almost a year after, the College of Education was created. In 2001, a College of Computer Studies was established. In school year 2004–2005, the university opened the College of Nursing. In the first semester of the academic year 2017-2018, the university opened the College of Law. The law school offers a four-year program leading to the Juris Doctor (JD) degree. Recently, in 2022, the Architecture program was opened under the College of Science, Engineering and Architecture, which was previously known as the College of Science and Engineering. With these separations and additions, the university now has a total number of 7 colleges.

University status was granted to the Ateneo de Naga on November 11, 1998, upon the approval by the Commission on Higher Education (CHED) on November 11, 1998, of Resolution No. 142-98.

=== Expansion ===
From 1947 to 2003, the college and high school were on the same campus, i.e., the Bagumbayan Campus which became crowded when AdNU became a university. Student population grew as the university added more undergraduate programs, and the campus open space shrunk as seven new buildings were constructed to provide additional facilities to the growing college population. These new structures are: Christ the King University Church, Jesuit Residence, Xavier Hall, Arrupe Hall, Fernando Hall (Conference Hall), O'Brien Hall (James J. O'Brien, S.J. library), the Engineering Building.

In the early 2000s, a ten-hectare land in Barangay Pacol, Naga City, was donated to AdNU. With the availability of a spacious new satellite campus, it was decided to transfer the high school from the Bagumbayan campus to this new campus to decongest the former. This new property, named the Bonoan Campus, became the new home of the high school in the summer of 2003 and is also where the newly opened grade school was to be located. With the availability of more land, the Ateneo de Naga can now admit a bigger student population. The same year of 2003, the high school became coeducational with the enrollment of 185 female students.

Up to the year 2013, the Ateneo de Naga was the only Ateneo institution in the Philippines without a grade school. On June 4, 2014, AdNU opened its grade school at the Bonoan Campus in Barangay Pacol, Naga City, when it admitted students for Grades 1–3. Classes were held at the high school building while the new grade school building was being constructed. The pre-school facility (the Ateneo Child Learning Center) also moved to the Bonoan Campus in school year 2014–2015.

Senior High School (SHS) of the Ateneo de Naga University is housed at Bagumbayan Campus. It has five academic tracks: Arts and Design Track (AVFX); Accountancy, Business, and Management (ABM); General Academic Strand (GAS); Humanities and Social Sciences (HUMSS) and; a unique Humanities and Social Sciences-Social Journalism (HUMSS-SJ).

All primary and secondary schools are also coeducational.

Statue of St. Ignatius of Loyola offering his sword to Our Lady of Monserrat

== Academics ==
In 1979, the college and high school departments were the first in Camarines Sur to be accredited by the Philippine Accrediting Association of Schools, Colleges and Universities (PAASCU). They were accredited for the third time in 1992. On May 25, 2009, the PAASCU granted institutional accreditation status to the university, a first for a private educational institution. The Federation of Accrediting Agencies of the Philippines (FAAP) certified AdNU's institutional accreditation on June 22, 2009.

In 2001, the Ateneo de Naga was among the first 22 private higher education institutions in the Philippines granted by CHED deregulated status for five years. At the same time CHED recognized its colleges. In 2007, CHED redesignated the College of Computer Studies as a Center for Development for Excellence in Information Technology Education and designated the College of Commerce as Center of Development in Business Administration and also in Entrepreneurship. In 2007 CHED identified the Graduate School as a delivering institution for its Faculty Development Program. On June 2, 2008, CHED granted the Ateneo de Naga autonomous status and approved the designation of the College of Education as a Center of Excellence in Teacher Education. The College of Computer Studies was also recognized as a CHED Center of Excellence in Information Technology in 2016.

As of 2020, the Ateneo de Naga is the only autonomous and institutionally accredited university in the Bicol region.

In 1991 the then-Department of Education, Culture and Sports placed the AdNU in its list of 18 excellent universities and colleges.

The University has 7 colleges, namely:

- College of Business and Accountancy
- College of Computer Studies
- College of Education
- College of Humanities and Social Sciences
- College of Law
- College of Nursing
- College of Science, Engineering, and Architecture

=== University press ===
Since 2005 the Ateneo has a publishing house for university research work and for outside manuscripts. While its daily operations are managed by the university press director, all publications receive final approval of the university president, upon the recommendation of the University Press Board.

== Jesuits honored ==
James J. O'Brien, S.J., Library

The following Jesuits have a building named after them, to honor their services.

- Fr. John Joseph Phelan, S.J., science building – for his 40-plus years service.
- Fr. James J. O'Brien, S.J., Library Main (Bagumbayan) Campus – for his long years of service.
- Fr. Francis D. Burns, S.J., academic building – first rector, helped establish AdNU, 1940.
- Fr. Raul Bonoan, S.J., Pacol campus and building on Bagumbayan campus – first president.
- Fr. Michael Rooney, S.J., high school building – guidance director, Jesuit Superior of Philippines.
- Servant of God Pedro Arrupe, S.J., convention hall – world-renowned Jesuit, Superior General 1965–83: coined "men and women for others" and gave social justice thrust to contemporary Jesuit education.
- Fr. Richard M. Fernando, S.J., conference hall – sacrificed his life to protect Cambodian students.
- St. Francis Xavier, S.J., student organization building – patron saint of the university.
- Fr. Hilario R. Bellardo, SJ. Senior High School building – director of religious formation (1993-2000) and student counselor (2001-2010) in high school. And for his 34 years of service at AdNU.

=== Student publication ===
The official tertiary student publication of the university is The Pillars Publication, which was founded in 1961. The senior high school student publication is Kurit Bulawan, while the junior high school student publication is Blue and Gold.

== Notable alumni ==
- Dato Arroyo (born 1974), former Congressman of Second District of Camarines Sur
- Victor Dennis T. Nierva (born 1980), poet, teacher, journalist, theatre actor, translator, graphic and book designer
- Jesse Robredo (1958–2012), Secretary of the Interior and Local Government, (1988-2006) Mayor of the City of Naga
- Raul Roco (1941–2005), lawyer, Philippine Senator, Education Secretary, Congressman
- Conrado de Quiros (1951–2023), Filipino journalist, columnist, and writer
- Bea Saw (born 1985), actress and Pinoy Big Brother Season 2 grand winner
- Francis Garchitorena (1938–2005), lawyer, retired Sandiganbayan Presiding Justice
- Joaquin Bernas (1932–2021), Jesuit priest, lawyer, college professor, writer, was Dean Emeritus of the Ateneo de Manila Law School and member of the 1986 Constitutional Commission which drafted the 1987 Philippine Constitution

== Gallery ==
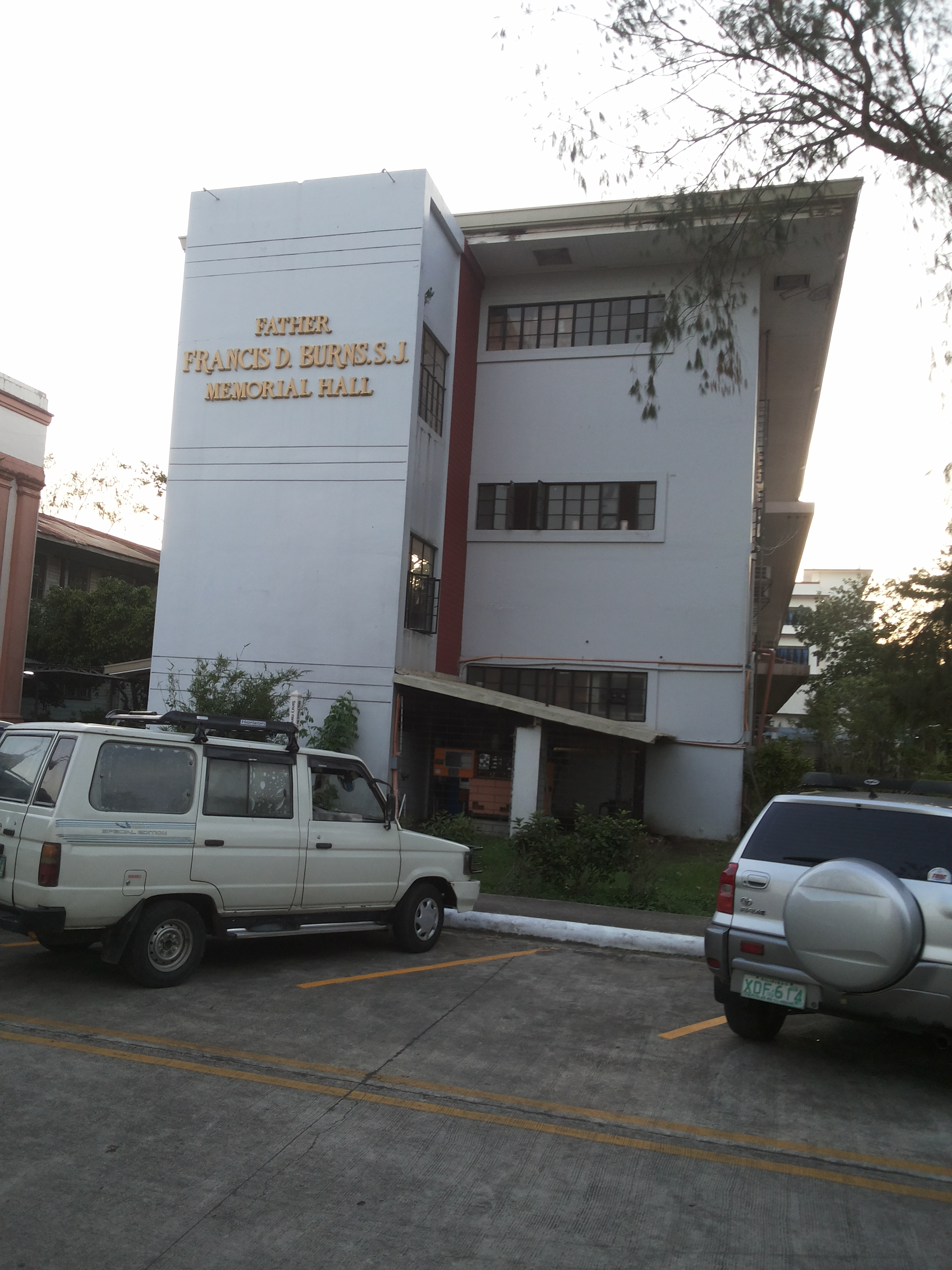
Burns Memorial Hall

Bonoan Hall

Arrupe Convention Hall

University Church of Christ the King

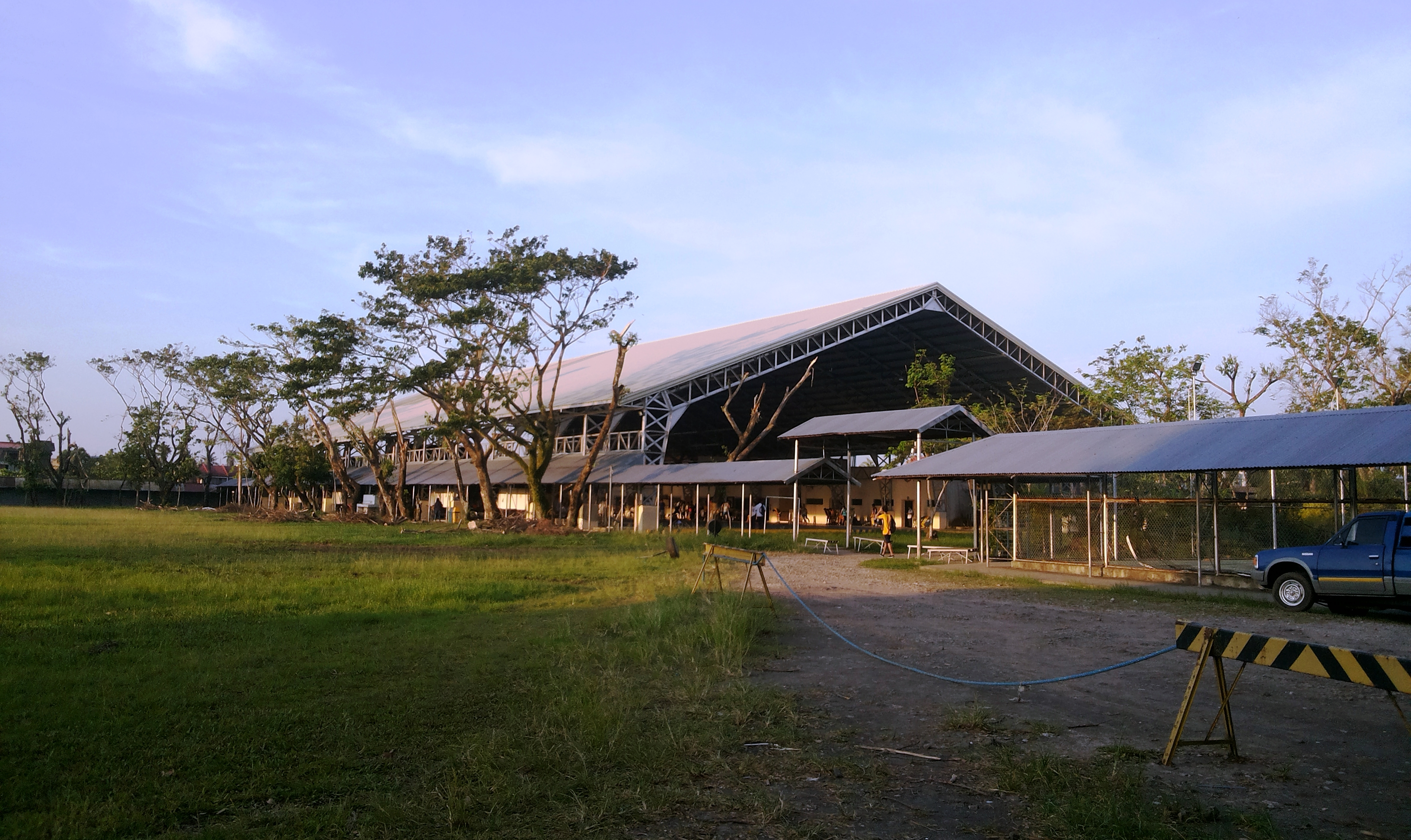
The University Covered Courts

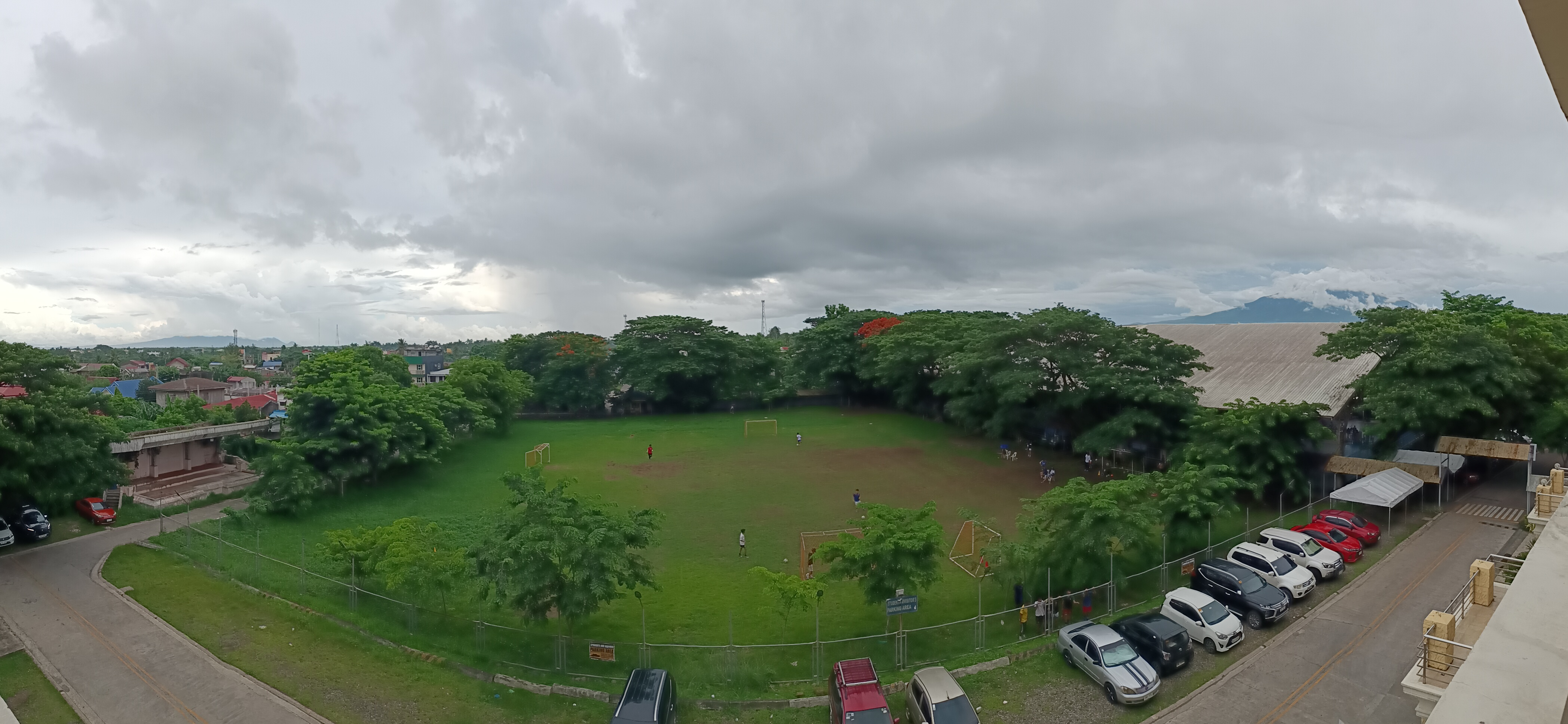
Panoramic view of the Ateneo de Naga University's football field

== See also ==
- List of Jesuit educational institutions
