= Ateneo de Zamboanga University Concert Band =

Philippines college marching band

- School: Ateneo de Zamboanga University
- Location: Zamboanga City, Philippines
- Founded: 1932
- Director: Jasper Pioquinto
- Members: 37
- Fight song: "El Animo Ateneo"
- Motto: One Band, One Sound!

The Ateneo de Zamboanga University Concert Band is the official student concert band of Ateneo de Zamboanga University. Its members consist of grade school, junior high school, senior high school and college students from the university. The band performs for various university functions, competitions, and official events within Zamboanga City, Philippines, and also operates as a marching band during parades. It has been called one of the "most enduring [bands] in the country."

== History ==
=== Early years ===
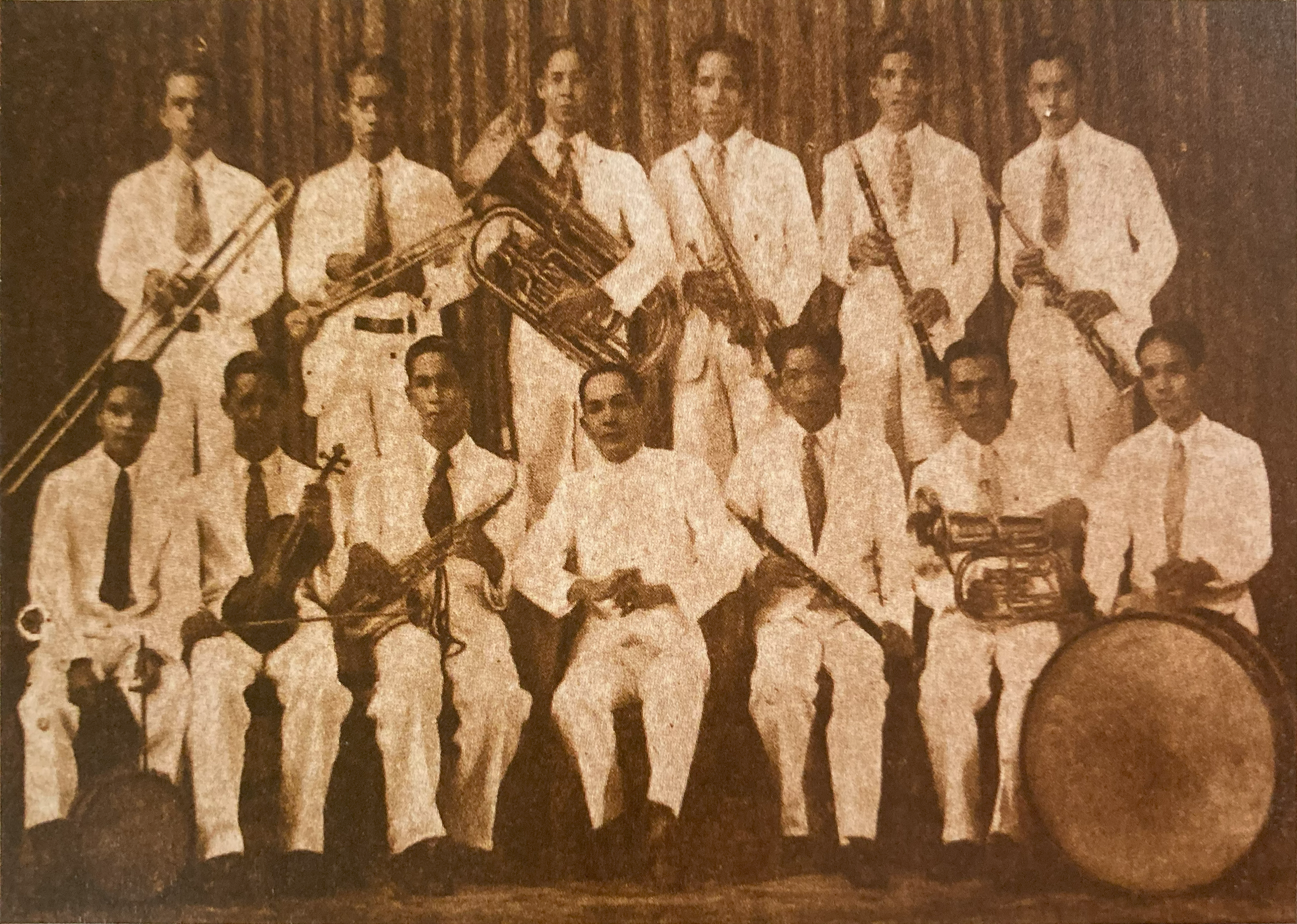
The Ateneo Orchestra Band in 1932.

Records show that an Ateneo band was established after the Ateneo High School was opened in 1928, along with a photo captioned "Ateneo Orchestra Band, 1932" consisting of its all-boys high school students. Its early activities were playing for graduation ceremonies. They regularly rehearsed in the patio beside the Immaculate Conception Church until the Mindanao Theater building was purchased by the Knights of Columbus, which the Ateneo moved into. American and Filipino priests and scholarly seminarians from Ateneo de Manila then transferred to Ateneo de Zamboanga and refurbished the band along with forming other school organizations. The last director of the pre-war band was Fr. Joseph N. Behr, S.J..^{[a]} The band's progress was interrupted by the outbreak of World War II, when the Ateneo campus was converted into a public school by the Japanese and was later shelled by American troops.

=== Re-establishment ===
The band was re-established on September 10, 1951, by Fr. Ernesto Carretero, S.J. and Mr. Arcadio Perez was assigned bandmaster. They continued their activities playing in parades, pass-in-review ceremonies, basketball games, and school programs. At the time, the anthem "Hail! Ateneo, Hail!" was being played by the band during school intramurals or homecomings. During the 1970s, the band served as a part of the Philippine Military Training (PMT) program and played during military drills and ceremonies.^{[b]}

=== Transition to a concert band ===
Mr. Apolonio Enriquez assumed the role of band director in 1991 and initiated a transformation from a marching and pep band to a full-fledged concert band. This development enabled the band to perform in concerts and formal occasions, expanding its repertoire to encompass classical, art music, popular, contemporary, and other musical styles.

Since the transformation, the concert band has competed in events such as the Zamboanga Brass Band competition during the Zamboanga Hermosa Festival, in which they won three times — in 2001, 2002 and 2008. The band has also performed in other schools in the country as part of its concert tour from 2009 to 2010, such as the Ateneo de Manila University, Ateneo de Davao University, Xavier University (Ateneo de Cagayan), Ateneo de Naga University, Sacred Heart School-Ateneo de Cebu, and Liceo de Cagayan University.

On July 7, 2016, a fire broke out in the Brebeuf Gymnasium, where the university band office was located. It burned all the band's equipment and facilities, its repertoire which was regarded as "nationally acclaimed," and all the brass instruments were melted in the fire. The band was able to recover through donations from organizations locally and nationally.

== Band leadership ==
Directors
1939–1941	Joseph N. Behr, S.J.
1951–1960	Arcadio Perez
1960–1983	Ildefonso Encarnacion
1983–late 1980s	Carlos "Carlito" Encarnacion
Late 1980s	Alfonso Encarnacion
Late 1980s–1990	Emelito Saavedra
1991–2023	Apolonio Enriquez
2023–2025	Carl Anthony Camacho
2025-present	Jasper Pioquinto

== List of previous concerts ==
Year	Month	Name	Location	Collaborations	Ref.
2002	May	Ode to Music	Ateneo de Zamboanga University	AdZU Chorale	
2002	-	The AdZU Band in Concert	Claret School of Lamitan		
2004	December	The AdZU Band in Concert	Claret College of Isabela		
2008	October	Classic Meets Rock	Ateneo de Zamboanga University		
2009	September	Classic Meets Rock	Ateneo de Davao University	AdDU Carillon Glee Club	
2009	November	Stint	Xavier University - Ateneo de Cagayan		
2009	November	Stint	Liceo de Cagayan University		
2010	February	aCAUSEtics	Ateneo de Zamboanga University		
2010	February	Music and You	Ateneo de Zamboanga University		
2010	June	Stint	Ateneo de Naga University		
2010	June	Stint	Ateneo de Manila University	Ateneo Grade School Boys Choir; Henri Ocier	
2010	June	Concert at the Park	Ateneo de Manila University		
2010	September	Stint	Sacred Heart School - Ateneo de Cebu		
2011	February	Amor	Garden Orchid Hotel and Convention Center		
2011	September	Ave Maria	Metropolitan Cathedral of the Immaculate Conception	The Paracletos	
2012	June	Gran Concierto	Garden Orchid Hotel and Convention Center	Zamboanga Hermosa Chorale	
2012	June	Gran Concierto	Zamboanga City Coliseum	Zamboanga Hermosa Chorale	
2012	September	SLA Benefit Concert	Ateneo de Zamboanga University	Ateneo Grade School Band; Ateneo Liturgical Society	
2012	December	Christmas Concert	Centro Pastoral de Zamboanga	Zamboanga Hermosa Chorale; Pastor Bonus Seminary Choir	
2013	May	Amigos para Siempre	Zamboanga Puericulture Center No. 144	Doc & Friends Ogie Diaz Kakai Bautista	
2016	December	And The Music Goes On...	Ateneo de Zamboanga University		
2016	December	GBPI TV11 Christmas Concert	GBPI TV11		
2017	February	#Grateful: The Concert	Zamboanga City Coliseum	Zamboanga Singing and Dancing Padres; Archbishop Romulo de la Cruz; ZCSPC Cantamos Chorale	
2017	November	A Homecoming	Ateneo de Zamboanga University	Major Chords	
2019	July	One Heart... One Melody... One Journey	Zamboanga City Coliseum	ZCSPC Cantamos Chorale	
2022	December	Ciento Diez: The Music of Homecoming	Ateneo de Zamboanga University	AdZU Glee Club	

== Notes ==
a.One source mentions a "Fr. Behr" as the director of the pre-war band. Only one Jesuit with "Behr" as a last name was assigned to the Jesuits' Zamboanga mission according to Japanese POW records.

b.Yearbook photos from 1972 and 1974 showed pictures of the band wearing military uniforms with helmets labeled PMT. They also listed the band as part of the "Military Programs."
