= 2026 Ateneo de Zamboanga University shooting =

School shooting in the Philippines

- CCTV footage showing the perpetrator at Ateneo de Zamboanga University carrying a backpack and a long black bag.
- Location: 6°56′43″N 122°5′3″E; Ateneo de Zamboanga University, Zamboanga City, Philippines
- Date: August 18, 2026 c. 7:50 a.m. (PHT)
- Target: Students and staff
- Attack type: School shooting, murder–suicide
- Weapons: Glock 22 .40 caliber semi-automatic pistol; 9mm pistol with conversion kit
- Deaths: 2 (including the perpetrator)
- Injuries: 23 (1 by gunfire)
- Perpetrator: Mohammad Mael Jalani
- Motive: Under investigation, Possible academic pressure or inspired by True Crime Community (TCC)

On August 18, 2026, a school shooting occurred at the junior high school building of the Ateneo de Zamboanga University in Zamboanga City, Philippines. Two people were killed, including the gunman, and 23 others were injured.

== Background ==
The Junior High School Building of the Ateneo de Zamboanga University where the shooting occurred, pictured in 2019

The Ateneo de Zamboanga University is a private, Catholic, co-educational, basic and higher education institution founded in 1912 by the Jesuits as an all-boys parochial school of the Zamboanga Cathedral. The university has three campuses in Zamboanga City, including the Kreutz Campus in Barangay Tumaga, which features a five-story school building that houses the university's grade school and junior high school students. The school has 25 security guards, of which 15 are on duty in the morning while the other 10 are on duty at night.

School shootings are rare in the Philippines, which has relatively strict gun ownership regulations, including background ‌checks and psychological evaluation requirements, although illegal firearms remain in circulation. In June 2026, two students opened fire at a public high school in Tacloban, killing three people and injuring 20 others before being arrested. Following the Tacloban shooting, the university began to conduct active shooter drills.

== Shooting ==
The perpetrator was dropped off in his father's car at the Ateneo de Zamboanga University's Kreutz Campus, entering the basement of the Junior High School Building using a disabled access ramp to avoid being frisked. He concealed the firearms in a bag. Police received calls of a shooting at the university at approximately 7:50 a.m. PHT. The shooter started a Facebook livestream on a body camera before he walked to a classroom door on the fourth floor and pointed a gun at a teacher. His gun jammed before it fired a shot, making people run to another classroom. The gunman proceeded to fix the jam and fire numerous shots into the other classroom, killing a student. The shooter then held the body camera to show his face and proceeded to shoot himself in the side of the head while simultaneously ending the livestream. The weapons used in the shooting were found nearby.

== Victims ==
Fifteen-year-old Patrick Dylan Wee, a Grade 10 student, was killed and 23 others were injured. A 15-year-old girl suffered a gunshot wound to the back, a 16-year-old boy was transported to hospital for shortness of breath, and 21 others were treated at the scene for injuries sustained while attempting to flee and panic attacks. False reports said four people were killed, including the shooter and two security guards, and nine others were injured. It was later determined that no staff or security guards were harmed.

== Perpetrator ==
The perpetrator was identified by police as Mohammad Mael Jalani, a Grade 8 student who used a 9mm pistol with a modification kit and a Glock 22 .40 caliber pistol. The pistol with the modification kit was initially thought to have been a high-powered rifle. The Glock used in the shooting was issued by the Bureau of Customs (BOC) to his father, a customs police chief at the Port of Zamboanga, while the other gun was the father's licensed personal firearm. Jalani stole both firearms from his father's car that brought him to the campus. His father said that Jalani had no experience with firearms.

Investigators are looking into the gaming and messaging history of Jalani. Zamboanga City mayor Khymer Adan Olaso described Jalani as a "very bright student" and a "Roblox fanatic". Olaso also stated that Jalani was under pressure over his grades and suffering from depression. Education Secretary Sonny Angara denied that Jalani was bullied or depressed. Interior secretary Jonvic Remulla said Jalani was "top of the class" with no previous incidents of bullying. The Department of Education (DepEd) also investigated potential ties to online nihilistic violent extremist groups.

On August 27, the Department of the Interior and Local Government announced that Jalani visited several websites promoting Satanism, nihilism, antisemitism, and anti-LGBT rhetoric to children but that no conclusive evidence for influence by NVE organisations could be found. An "established school-related or personal grievance" was also ruled out as a motive.

== Aftermath ==
Classes at the Ateneo de Zamboanga University were suspended for the rest of the day by the mayor. The university later extended the suspension to August 28 to allow the school community recovery, followed by the resumption of in-person classes on September 1 with a Catholic Mass led by University President Father Guillrey Anthony Andal. Students attended wellness-focused alternative learning activities from September 1 to 4. A thorough investigation into the shooting was ordered. The Zamboanga City government urged the public to refrain from spreading unverified information and footage of the attack. Facebook suspended the shooter's account on the day of the incident. PLDT, Smart, and Globe blocked websites streaming school violence, including this incident, three days later. The DepEd said it is coordinating with its mental health partners to provide psychological first aid and psychosocial support to people affected by the attack.

Shortly after the shooting, Jalani's father was suspended by the Bureau of Customs. The bureau also ordered all of its employees to fill out compliance forms regarding their service issue firarms. On August 27, Jalani's father and a security guard of Ateneo de Zamboanga University were charged with reckless imprudence resulting in homicide and physical injury.

== Reactions ==
President Bongbong Marcos ordered authorities and agencies to strengthen protection for students, and expressed condolences to the families of the deceased. Davao City and Negros Oriental also strengthened security measures in schools.

Jonvic Remulla said the shooting strengthened calls for changes in firearm law. He also called on Congress to pass a law that bans first-person shooter games. Senator Risa Hontiveros also called for stricter firearm regulations and tighter rules governing gun safekeeping.

Ateneo de Zamboanga University President Father Guillrey Anthony Andal and Zamboanga City mayor Khymer Adan Olaso declared August 19 a day of mourning and prayer across both the university and the city, respectively.

Senator Robin Padilla called on Meta, which owns and operates Facebook, to take down videos and photos of the school shooting and the victims' remains to stop the spread of sensationalized content. He also stressed the urgent need to review and strengthen existing laws on youth and social media.

In a joint security briefing with the university, city government, and the police, Education Secretary Sonny Angara called for a holistic, community-wide approach to school safety that goes beyond physical campus security.

The Roman Catholic Archdiocese of Zamboanga demanded a thorough investigation and accountability following the shooting. Meanwhile, Manila Archbishop Cardinal Jose Advincula urged greater compassion and support for youth, emphasizing that schools must provide safe spaces to address anxiety and bullying.

Ateneo de Davao University intensified its security after the shooting.

== See also ==
- Ateneo de Manila University shooting, another school shooting within another Jesuit educational institution in 2022
- List of filmed mass shootings
- Livestreamed crime
