= List of universities and colleges in Zamboanga City =

This is a list of tertiary schools in Zamboanga City, Philippines.

== Universities and Colleges ==
=== A ===
- AMA Computer College-Zamboanga Campus
- Ateneo de Zamboanga University

=== B ===
- Brent Hospital & Colleges Incorporated

=== E ===
- Ebenezer Bible College and Seminary

=== I ===
- Immaculate Conception Archdiocesan School

=== J ===
- J-Jireh School Inc.

=== P ===
- Pastor Bonus College Seminary, School of Philosophy
- Pilar College
- Puericulture Maternity Hospital School of Nursing

=== S ===
- Southern City Colleges

=== U ===
- Universidad de Zamboanga
- Universal College of Southeast Asia and the Pacific
- Colegio de la Ciudad de Zamboanga

=== W ===
- Western Mindanao State University
- Winzelle International College

=== Z ===
- Zamboanga Peninsula Polytechnic State University (ZPPSU)
- Zamboanga State College of Marine Sciences and Technology (ZSCMST)
