= Zamboanga Peninsula Polytechnic State University =

Public university in Zamboanga City, Philippines

- Politeknikong Pamantasang Pampamahalaan ng Tangway ng Zamboanga (Filipino)
- Other name: ZPPSU
- Former names: Zamboanga City Trade School (1905–1959); Zamboanga School of Arts and Trades (1959–1992); Zamboanga City Polytechnic College (1992–2001); Zamboanga City State Polytechnic College (2001–2021)
- Type: Public Nonsectarian Higher Education Institution
- Established: 1905; 121 years ago
- Academic affiliations: Philippine Association of State Universities and Colleges; Mindanao Association State Colleges and Universities Foundation, Inc.
- Chairman: Michelle Aguilar-Ong, DPA
- President: Nelson P. Cabral, Ed.D.
- Vice-president: Josephine L. Sulasula, MPA (VP for Admin and Finance); Maria Christina G. Wee, Ed.D. (VP for Academic Affairs); Cyrus Pil P. Cadavedo, Ph.D. (VP for Student Affairs and Services); Rolando P. Malalay, Ph.D. (VP for Research Development and Extension)
- Faculty: 300+
- Students: 20,000+
- Location: R.T. Lim, Blvd., Baliwasan, Zamboanga City, Philippines; 6°54′44″N 122°03′33″E
- Campus: Urban
- Website: zppsu.edu.ph
- Location in Mindanao Location in the Philippines

Zamboanga Peninsula Polytechnic State University, also referred to by its acronym ZPPSU, is a state university in Zamboanga City, Philippines. It was established in July 1905 and is situated just a few meters from another state university, Western Mindanao State University and about 500 metres (1,600 ft) from Pilar College along R.T. Lim Boulevard. It is in the university belt of the city where most of the colleges are.

== History ==
The Zamboanga Peninsula Polytechnic State University was established in July 1905, at the present site of the Zamboanga Central School. It was administered by American teachers with Mr. Hogges as its principal. He was succeeded by Mr. Ash, where the original shop class was increased to two shop classes and a drawing class added.

In 1912, due to the increased enrolment, this classes were separated from the Zamboanga Central School and were moved two kilometers away to barangay Baliwasan (the present site). The shop classes were held at the nearby Zamboanga Normal School. Mr. Parker was its first principal.

In 1921 it was converted into a provincial trade school known as the Zamboanga Trade School and was authorized to offer the secondary curriculum. Mr. Parker was succeeded by Mr. Vicente Macairan in 1924. It was during his term as principal that a two-storey building was erected. Mr. Vicente Enrile took the place of Mr. Macairan as principal in 1934.

After the granting of the Charter of Zamboanga City in 1936 by virtue of Commonwealth Act No. 39, the Zamboanga Trade School was placed under the administration of the city and was converted into the Zamboanga City Trade School. The school was authorized to continue offering the secondary trade curriculum. The school was temporarily closed during World War II. Four shop buildings were constructed under Mr. Enrile's administration. Classes resumed after the war in 1945.

In 1954, by virtue of Republic Act No. 846, the Zamboanga City Trade School was converted into regional school of arts and trades known as the Zamboanga City Regional School of Arts and Trades, with Mr. Marcelo S. Bonilla as its first superintendent. RA 846 authorized the school to offer post-secondary courses in Trade Technical Education. Moreover, during the school years 1954-55 and 1955–56, five shop buildings were set up: two FOA-PHILCUSA buildings, a Girl's Trade Building, and two shops for Auto Mechanics and Boat Building.

In 1959, by virtue of Republic Act No. 2300, the school was converted into a national school known as Zamboanga School of Arts and Trades. Since then, in the General Appropriations Act (GAA) and in all communications from the Bureau of Public Schools, the term “City Regional” has been deleted. In the same year, Mr. Bonilla was transferred to Ilo-ilo School of Arts and Trades and Mr. Mariano P. Dagdag became the new superintendent of the school.

Beginning in 1962 the Four-Year Industrial Teacher Education Curriculum leading to the degree of Bachelor of Science in Industrial Education (BSIE) was offered by virtue of Republic Act No. 3268. Mr. Dagdag likewise introduced improvements including the construction of a science building, a related-subjects building, an administration building and a gymnasium.

In 1966, in order to help workers in the industry update and enhance their skills and competence and give opportunity to out of school youths, the school started to offer the two-year Special Trade Curriculum otherwise called the Evening Opportunity Program Classes in school year 1966–67. Upon retirement of Mr. Mariano Dagdag in 1967, Mr. Felizardo Camilon came in as a Superintendent of the school. Mr. Camilon was succeeded by Mr. Pedro Gomez, Sr. in 1971. During the latter's term, the TVEP programs were established and the TEI Building was constructed.

In 1975, because of the growing need for industrial technologist the Zamboanga of Arts and Trade was chosen as one of the trade schools authorized by the Department of Education, Culture and Sports to offer the Bachelor of Science in Industrial Technology (Four-Year BSIT) through Department Order No. 28, s. 1975 dated August 8. 1975, the World Food Bodega Building was constructed. The ROTC building and another prefab building adjacent to it were also constructed. Shops like the industrial arts, drafting and boat buildings were refurbished.

In 1978, the school was given authority by the Ministry of Education, Culture and Sports (MECS) to offer the six-month Basic Seaman Training Course under MECS Permit No. 5, s.1978.

In 1982, the school was selected as one of the twenty-one trade technical schools to become Technician Education Institute (TEI) under the ROADB Technical-Vocational Education Project (TVEP). This project through MECS Order No. 38, s. 1982, authorized the offering of the two-year Diploma of Technology. Mr. Pedro F. Gomez, Sr. retired in 1985 and Mr. Utumama Abdulla became the officer-in-charge of the school. During Mr. Abdulla's term the technician programs were enriched and lengthened to three years starting school year 1986-87 when MECS Order No. 17, s. 1986 superseded MECS Order No. 38, s, 1982. Dr. Jausan Tahil came over from Samar and became the Superintendent of the Zamboanga School of Arts and Trades. By the authority of DECS Order No. 56, s. 1987 the school offered the one-year Craftsman Certificate and two-year Certificate of Technology.

As the school developed in its pursuit to meet the challenges of the times, in 1991 it was authorized to offer the Bachelor of Science in Marine Engineering (BSMarE) through the issuance of DECS Order No. 22, s. 1991 on March 5, 1991. Also, in the same year, the school started offering the Master of Arts in Teaching Vocational Education (MATVE) with major fields in Industrial Arts and Home Economics through DECS Order No. 59, s. 1991.

During the incumbency of Dr. Jausan L. Tahil, the construction of the TEI Building was finally completed. Renovations were made in the Machine Shop Technology, Automotive Technology, and Refrigeration and Air-Conditioning Technology buildings. And the Boat Building Shop became the Civil Technology Shop. The old College Building was re-constructed, the ESF High School building and BSIE Buildings were constructed thru the efforts of Congresswoman Maria Clara L. Lobregat. The school became a recipient of Philippine Australian Technical Vocational Education Program (PATVEP).

Because of her great concern for the improvement and development of technical and industrial education, Congresswoman Maria Clara L. Lobregat sponsored the bill in 1992 converting the Zamboanga School of Arts and Trades into Zamboanga City Polytechnic College by virtue of Republic Act No. 7474.

Due to the untimely death of Dr. Jausan L. Tahil in 1996, Mr. Lionel R. Villavieja the College Dean, assumed as officer-in-charge and eventually became the Superintendent in 1998. During this time the school was undergoing a process where Republic Act 8292 played a vital role. While integration with Western Mindanao State University was deemed imminent, Mr. Villavieja stood firm on his stance against it. This conversion was finally paid-off when Republic Act 9142 was approved on July 20, 2001. The college once more evolved into an institution known as Zamboanga City State Polytechnic College. This special law, sponsored by Congressman Celso L. Lobregat, pursues the excellence in technical and industrial education and in the development of research in these areas. Mr. Lionel R. Villavieja, is the last Superintendent of the college and is the first president of the Zamboanga City State Polytechnic College, his appointment was approved on September 13, 2002.

Dr. Nora M. Ponce became the second president of the College on January 13, 2009. During her term, more curricular programs were offered. Among these are: Bachelor of Science in Hotel and Restaurant Management, Bachelor of Science in Civil Engineering, Bachelor of Science in Information Technology and Bachelor of Science in Development Communication. It was also during her stint as president that several infra projects were built including the ZCSPC Gymnasium. The quest towards becoming a university had also begun under her term.

The third and current president – Dr. Nelson P. Cabral assumed office on May 5, 2017. His administration prioritizes the development and enhancement of the engineering and technology programs of the college with massive procurement of laboratory equipment in engineering, science and technology as part of its vision to become one of the best polytechnic schools in the country. Infrastructure projects for the improvement of the school's facilities are on the pipeline as part of its priority projects along with many other programs and projects all geared towards inevitably becoming a university.

In April 2021, the Commission on Higher Education Region Office IX approved the transformation of the Zamboanga City State Polytechnic College into a State University, officially named the Zamboanga Peninsula Polytechnic State University (ZPPSU), marking a significant milestone for education in the Zamboanga Peninsula. This development represents the region's third State University, bolstering the availability of higher education opportunities for the local population.

== See also ==
- Zamboanga City
- List of Tertiary schools in Zamboanga City
