= Bill Kreutz =

American and Filipino priest (born 1935)

2nd President of Ateneo de Zamboanga University
- In office May 1, 1989 – 2007
- Preceded by: Ernesto Carretero
- Succeeded by: Tony Moreno

Personal life
- Born: August 16, 1935 (age 91) New York City, New York, United States
- Education: Brooklyn Preparatory School; Fordham University; Boston College

Religious life
- Religion: Christianity
- Denomination: Roman Catholic
- Order: Jesuits
- Ordination: May 1, 1969

William Henry "Bill" Kreutz SJ (born August 16, 1935) is an American and Filipino Jesuit priest who was the longest serving president of the Ateneo de Zamboanga University. He succeeded the first president, Fr. Ernesto Carretero SJ, in 1989 and served as university president until 2007.

Born and raised in New York City, he studied at various Jesuit-affiliated institutions before joining the Society of Jesus himself in August 1958. He did his missionary work in the Philippines, starting as a teacher of the Ateneo de Manila High School from 1963 to 1965. He was ordained priest in 1969 and continued to be a mathematics teacher at the Ateneo de Manila College from 1972 to 1980. He was a naturalized Filipino by the late 1970s.

From 1980 to 1989, he served as the director of Admissions and Aid for the AdMU College of Arts and Sciences, providing full scholarships to a number of students and established the Scholars-for-Scholars Scholarship Fund in August 1987. He also founded the Jesuit Volunteers Philippines in 1980, the longest-running domestic-volunteer-sending program in the Philippines.

Kreutz was elected as the second president of the Ateneo de Zamboanga University, and he assumed the position on May 1, 1989. He served as the Ateneo president for 18 years, with his term being extended due to Ateneo's ongoing efforts to receive university status. His term ended in 2007 when Fr. Tony Moreno SJ took over as president.

== Early life and education ==
Kreutz was born on August 16, 1935, in Howard Beach, Queens, New York City. He studied at Brooklyn Prep during his high school years, and Fordham University during his college years. He received his master's degree in mathematics at Boston College.

== As a Jesuit ==
=== As an educator of Ateneo de Manila University ===
Kreutz joined the Society of Jesus on August 14, 1958, after he graduated from college. He volunteered as a missionary to the Philippines in June 1963, teaching mathematics, English, and Latin at the Ateneo de Manila High School until 1965. He pursued his theology courses at the Loyola House of Studies and was later ordained priest there on May 1, 1969. After receiving his master's degree, he taught graduate-level mathematics at the Ateneo de Manila College from 1972 to 1980. In 1975, he became the university chaplain. During this time, he obtained his Filipino citizenship through naturalization in the late 1970s.

He served as the director of the Admissions and Aid of the AdMU College of Arts and Sciences from 1980 to 1989, wherein he often provided full scholarships to a number of students. As director, he initiated the Scholars-for-Scholars Scholarship Fund in August 1987, aiding students through the assistance of alumni scholars. His initiatives led to the formation of the Ateneo Alumni Scholars Association (AASA) in 2002.

=== Jesuit Volunteers Philippines ===
Kreutz founded the Jesuit Volunteers Philippines Foundation, Inc. (JVP) in 1980. The JVP was formed with the mission of assisting underserved communities in rural areas of the Philippines. Its members are composed of new college graduates and young professionals. It is the longest-running domestic-volunteer-sending program in the country.

=== As president of Ateneo de Zamboanga ===
The high school building, serving as the façade of the Fr. William H. Kreutz, SJ campus.

Kreutz was elected as the 2nd president of Ateneo de Zamboanga by its board of trustees and officially assumed the position on May 1, 1989. Since the beginning of his term, he was nicknamed "Ateneo's Superman" due to his similar facial resemblance to Christopher Reeve from the 1978 Superman film. Under Kreutz, the Ateneo campus experienced a building boom with the construction of Xavier Hall, the multi-purpose covered court, and the construction of a new campus in Barangay Tumaga named after him.

His fourth term was scheduled to end in May 2001, but due to a pending application for Ateneo's university status, his term was extended by the Society of Jesus. Along with the past efforts of Fr. Ernesto Carretero, the previous president, his efforts contributed to Ateneo de Zamboanga being granted university status by the Commission on Higher Education on August 20, 2001.

In 1990, he established the Zamboanga Medical School Foundation Inc. (ZMSF), a non-stock, non-profit corporation affiliated with Ateneo de Zamboanga, addressing the need for a medical school in the region. After Ateneo obtained university status, ZMSF was absorbed by the university and later became the AdZU School of Medicine.

== See also ==
- Guillrey Anthony Andal, the incumbent president of the Ateneo de Zamboanga University
