= Major Chords =

Philippine singing group

- The Major Chords group in the cover of their 2000 album, Paseo de Amigos ...despues de todo.

Background information
- Origin: Zamboanga City, Philippines
- Genres: Chavacano folk music
- Years active: 1978–present

The Major Chords is a Filipino musical group based in Zamboanga City, known for their role in the promotion and preservation of the Chavacano language through music. Formed in 1978, it was initially composed of members from the Temato Social Clan of Ateneo de Zamboanga. Their debut and only album, Paseo de Amigos ...despues de todo., features renditions of traditional Zamboanga folk songs and original Chavacano compositions, and has been cited in academic linguistic research and incorporated into DepEd learning materials on the music of Zamboanga. The group has been featured as representative performers of Zamboanga Peninsula culture at national events organized by the Department of Tourism.

== History ==
In 1972, the Temato Social Clan was formed for Ateneo de Zamboanga students interested in singing. The group initially sang songs from The Lettermen, APO Hiking Society, and American folk songs, but gained popularity when they began singing Chavacano songs. They performed for various programs in Ateneo and weddings around the city. The group started recruiting new members and was later renamed the "Temato Choral Society" in 1973, performing in venues such as the Zamboanga Plaza Hotel. In 1975, Temato was invited to perform at different events outside the city, such as in Bayview Plaza, Manila, and later changed back to their original name "Temato Social Clan" in the same year.

The original group members, alumni and non-students at the time, decided to disband the Temato Social Clan in the early weeks of December 1978. Before this, some members of the group still studying at Ateneo decided to form their own musical group, and on November 27, 1978, the Major Chords was formed. The name was proposed by Bobit Navarro, one of the main composers of the group.

Several songfests held in Ateneo de Zamboanga were sponsored by the group in the late 1970s, a role that was previously fulfilled by the Temato Social Clan. The group performed their first tour outside the city in Isabela, Basilan, on December 22, 1979, with a concert sponsored by the Knights of Columbus. They continued to host concerts in Ateneo through the 1980s, collaborating with different choral groups on campus. The group did another tour in 1991 at the Philippine International Convention Center, where they featured their Chavacano songs, representing Region IX in an event sponsored by the Department of Tourism.

On July 27, 2000, the Major Chords released its only album, "Paseo de Amigos ...despues de todo." At the time of its release, all of the group's members have since graduated from Ateneo and were already professionals. The album launch took place at the Marcian Garden Convention Center, with subsequent performances at Ateneo de Zamboanga on July 28 and at the Western Mindanao State University on July 29 together with the WMSU Grand Chorale. Local sources have noted the album's role in the preservation of the Chavacano language and credited the group with reviving traditional Chavacano folk songs for a contemporary audience. Since the album's release, they continue to perform Chavacano music locally and nationally, often invited by the Department of Tourism to represent the culture of Zamboanga Peninsula.

== Members ==
The singing group's members consist of Ateneo de Zamboanga students and alumni. However, the group is more recognized with its original members:

- Alfonso "Chito" Lozaga
- Allan Basa
- Apolonio "Polly" Enriquez - musical director
- Conrado "Shing" Balatbat
- Efigenio "Jungjung" Aquino
- Eulogio "Logio" San Juan, Jr.
- Frederick "Rikki" Lim
- Kennedy "Kenny" Basa
- Leonardo Rey "Cachito" Vasquez
- Ramon "Bobit" Navarro - main composer
- Ricardo Jaime "Totoy" Vasquez
- Romeo "Romy" Camins

== Discography ==
=== Paseo de Amigos ...despues de todo. (studio album) ===
Paseo de Amigos ...despues de todo. is the debut studio album and the only album released by the Filipino musical group Major Chords. It was released on July 27, 2000, on cassette tapes and CDs. The album features renditions of old Zamboanga folk songs as well as original Chavacano compositions. The majority of the songs were composed by Norma Camins-Conti and Bobit Navarro. It was recorded in May 2000 and at Sony Grams Studio, with musical arrangements written by Mandy Ferrer.

Paseo de Amigos ...despues de todo.
No.	Title	Music	Length
1.	"Vamos a Zamboanga"	Norma Camins-Conti	03:28
2.	"Chabacano"	Bobit Navarro	02:32
3.	"Paseo de Amigos"	Norma Camins-Conti	03:12
4.	"Mientras Que Yo Ta Vivi"	Norma Camins-Conti	03:23
5.	"Aire de Zamboanga"	Bobit Navarro	02:23
6.	"Malo Mucho Vicio"	Bobit Navarro	03:04
7.	"Canciones de Maga Bata"	Concept by Polly Enriquez, Romy Camins	04:27
8.	"Mama Yo Quiero"	Traditional	02:47
9.	"Canciones de Patente"	Concept by Major Chords	04:32
10.	"Zamboanga Hermosa"	Vicente Orendain, Borromeo Lou	02:26
11.	"No Te Vayas de Zamboanga"	Juan Cuadrado Sr.	03:50
12.	"Vamos a Zamboanga" (Extended Version)	Norma Camins-Conti	05:19
Total length:			41:23
