= Hermosa Festival =

Annual festival in Zamboanga City, Philippines

- Genre: Cultural
- Dates: Whole Month of October (12)
- Locations: Zamboanga City, Philippines
- Years active: October 12, 1926; 100 years ago
- Patron: Nuestra Señora del Pilar

The Hermosa Festival, also known as Zamboanga La Hermosa Festival, popularly known as Fiesta Pilar, is a month-long festival held annually in Zamboanga City, Philippines. It is one of the oldest festivals in the country and the most awaited event in the region.

The festival is held in honor of the miraculous image of Our Lady of the Pillar (Spanish and Chavacano: Nuestra Señora del Pilar), the patroness of Zamboanga City which is held in every October 12. It is also the patroness of Zaragoza in Spain, the sister city of Zamboanga in Philippines.

== History ==
The Zamboanga La Hermosa Festival is embedded in Zamboanga’s history of devotion to the Nuestra Señora del Pilar, and is supplemented by local legends.

In the Spanish Era, Zamboanga was an integral part of Spanish Colonization. In 1635, the Spaniards built a fort in Zamboanga named Real Fuerza de San Jose in Brgy. Zone IV area to secure them against the attacks of the moro warriors. Spaniards held the city as a seat of government and became the cultural center of the south, and was deeply seated in Hispanic heritage and tradition.

In 1734, The Lady's image was brought to the fort as a front piece for the main entrance. The western side of the fort was converted into a shrine for The Lady when the fort was rebuilt in 1860 and the fort was renamed Real Fuerza de Nuestra Señora Virgen del Pilar and some also called the fort as Real Fuerza de Nuestra Señora Virgen del Pilar de Zaragoza because of the same name of the Basilica in Zaragoza, Spain.

The city’s devotion to the Lady of Pilar was legendary, because of the wealth of stories, miracles, and apparitions surrounding the virgin for the past few years in the city as people what believed.

== Features ==
The festival features numerous activities such as a street dance competition, where different schools in the city compete for the title. Major activities include the Wow Zamboanga, showing different tastes, talents and ideas, and functions as a showcase for what each barangay has that others do not. One of the most popular events is the Regatta De Zamboanga, where the Vintas of Zamboanga race to win the title. Other special events such as the Cosechas De Zamboanga, sporting events, music concerts, agriculture-trade fairs, fashion show, chavacano song festival, and Miss Zamboanga are held every year.
