= Guillrey Anthony Andal =

Filipino priest (born 1976)

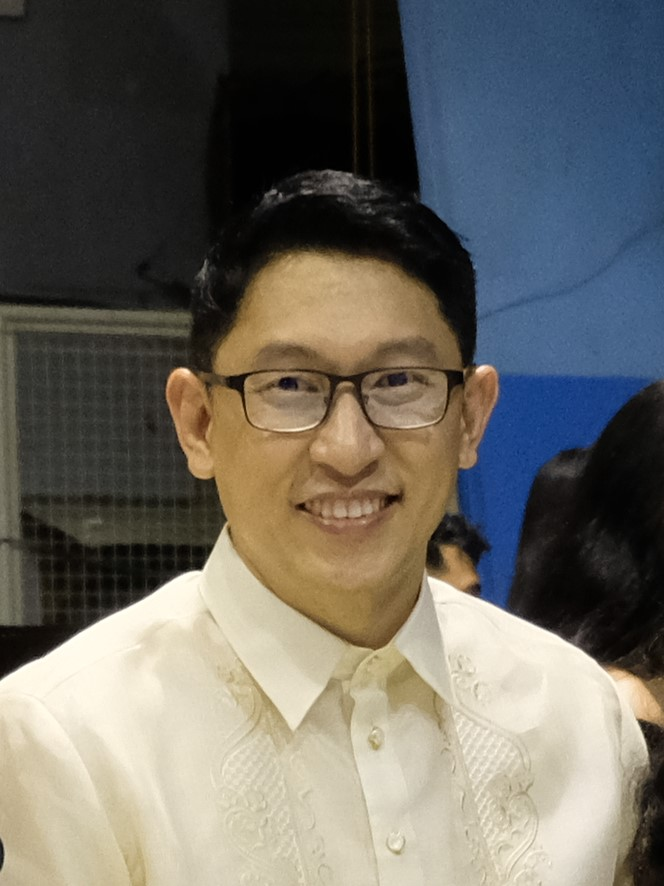
- Andal in 2023

5th President of the Ateneo de Zamboanga University
- Incumbent
- Assumed office March 15, 2023
- Preceded by: Karel San Juan

Personal life
- Born: March 5, 1976 (age 50) Quezon City, Philippines
- Education: Ateneo de Manila University; Loyola Marymount University

Religious life
- Religion: Christianity
- Denomination: Roman Catholicism
- Order: Jesuits
- Ordination: April 12, 2014

Guillrey Anthony "Ernald" Mallari Andal, S.J. (born March 5, 1976) is a Filipino Jesuit priest who currently serves as the fifth president of the Ateneo de Zamboanga University (AdZU). He assumed office on March 15, 2023 and succeeded Karel San Juan.

A Quezon City native, Andal studied in the Ateneo de Manila University from elementary to college and later worked at the Bank of the Philippine Islands in 1998. After disliking his time working at a bank, he entered the Society of Jesus in 2003 and was ordained a priest in 2014. As a Jesuit, he was assigned educational roles in various parts of the Philippines. He served as the director of St. Isidore High School in Malaybalay City, Bukidnon from 2014 to 2017. He used his experiences as school director to pursue his doctorate in education at the Loyola Marymount University in the United States, receiving it in 2020.

After returning to the Philippines in July of that year, Andal was assigned to the Ateneo de Davao University as the Assistant to the Academic Vice President before being moved to AdZU in July 2022. The AdZU Board of Trustees elected Andal as the university's next president in August 2022, formally assuming office on March 15, 2023. Beyond the presidency, he serves as a trustee at several Jesuit-run schools and holds regional leadership posts in Catholic education associations.

== Early life and education ==
Andal was born in Quezon City, Philippines, on March 5, 1976, to dentists Reynaldo Andal and Erlinda Andal. He studied in the Ateneo de Manila University during his basic education years from 1980 to 1994 and graduated cum laude with a Bachelor of Arts in Management Economics degree in 1998. He also attended the Loyola School of Theology, receiving his Bachelor of Sacred Theology degree in 2014. He was conferred a Master of Arts in Pastoral Ministry degree in 2015. In 2020, he finished his Doctorate in Education for Leadership for Social Justice at Loyola Marymount University in Los Angeles, California, United States.

== Early career ==
From 1998 to 2003, Andal worked at the Bank of the Philippine Islands (BPI) as an Operations Officer in the Retail Banking Division. By his fourth and fifth year, Andal had grown dissatisfied with working at BPI, leading him to join the Society of Jesus.

== As a Jesuit ==
Andal entered the Society of Jesus in 2003. He was ordained deacon on September 14, 2013, and as priest on April 12, 2014.

=== Service ===
Andal joined the Simbahang Lingkod ng Bayan as a political program development officer from 2006 to 2007 and 2010 to 2011. He regularly appeared in a Catholic TV program by JesCom and ABS-CBN titled Kape't Pandasal as the show's Thursday host from 2007 to 2017. He was the Executive Director of the Jesuit Music Ministry from 2011 to 2013. After his ordination, from 2014 to 2017, he served as an Assistant Parish Priest of Our Lady Mary Mediatrix of All Grace Parish in Malaybalay City, Bukidnon.

When Andal returned to the Philippines after finishing his studies in the United States, Fr. Primitivo E. Viray Jr., the then Provincial Superior of the Jesuits in the Philippines, assigned him to the Ateneo de Davao University on July 14, 2020, wherein he acted as the Assistant to the Academic Vice President of the university. On July 1, 2022, he was assigned to the Ateneo de Zamboanga University as its Basic Education Chaplain.

=== Election as president of AdZU ===
On August 22, 2022, a week prior to his tertianship, he was elected by the Ateneo de Zamboanga University Board of Trustees as the next president of the university. He assumed office on March 15, 2023 shortly after his tertianship, and was officially installed on June 17, 2023.

== As an educator ==
Andal was a youth minister at the University of the Philippines-Diliman Chaplaincy Office from 2005 to 2006. From 2008 to 2010, he taught religious studies at Sacred Heart School - Ateneo de Cebu for his regency. He worked as a radio commentator for a weekly youth-oriented political talk show on Radio Veritas-Manila, from 2011 to 2014. He served as the director of St. Isidore High School in Malaybalay City, Bukidnon from 2014 to 2017. His experiences as an educator in Bukidnon led him to pursue his doctoral studies at Loyola Marymount University.

== Activity ==
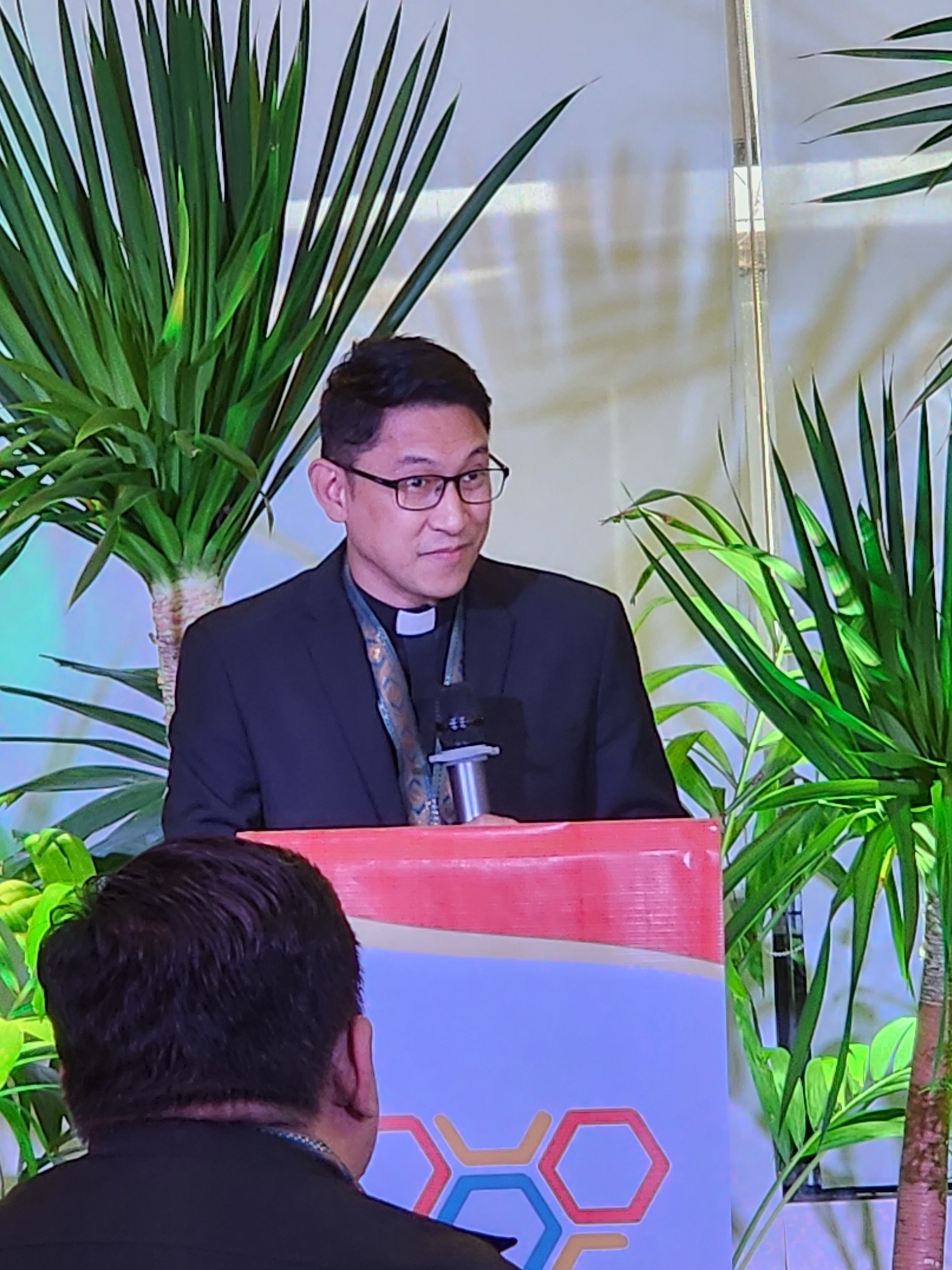
Andal during the launching of the ZamPen InnoHive.

=== Board memberships ===
Andal serves as a trustee at Ateneo de Davao University, Ateneo de Naga University, Xavier University – Ateneo de Cagayan, Xavier School, and Sacred Heart School – Ateneo de Cebu.

He also serves as the current president of the Zamboanga Basilan Sulu Tawi-Tawi Association of Private Schools (ZAMBASULTAPS), the regional director of the Catholic Educational Association of the Philippines (CEAP) for Region 9, and the regional program director of the Private Education Assistance Committee for Region 9.

=== Institutional partnerships ===
Andal assisted in developing partnerships for AdZU with other institutions such as Ateneo de Manila University to open the Master of Laws program, the first in Region 9, as well as with organizations such as SM Supermalls, the Nayong Pilipino Foundation, DTI, DOST, and DICT.

== See also ==
- Bill Kreutz, the longest-serving president of the Ateneo de Zamboanga University
