= Pilar College =

Roman Catholic college in Zamboanga City, Philippines

Pilar College of Zamboanga City
- Motto: Initium Sapientiae Timor Domini (Latin)
- Motto in English: The Fear of the Lord is the Beginning of Wisdom
- Type: Private Catholic basic and higher education institution
- Established: 1894; 132 years ago
- Founder: Congregation of the Religious of the Virgin Mary (RVM)
- Religious affiliation: Catholic Church (RVM Sisters)
- Director: Sister Ma. Andrea L. Yee, RVM
- Location: Zamboanga City, Philippines; 6°54′33″N 122°03′56″E
- Colors: Blue and white
- Website: www.pczc.edu.ph
- Location in Mindanao Location in the Philippines

Pilar College of Zamboanga City, Inc. is a private Catholic basic and higher education institution owned and administered by the Religious of the Virgin Mary (RVM) in Zamboanga City, Philippines. It was founded by the RVM Sisters in 1894 as a Cartilla School. It is located at R.T. Lim Boulevard, Zamboanga City. The college provides Catholic education to the children and the youth of Zamboanga City and the southwestern part of Mindanao.

== History ==
=== Founding ===
The college was founded in 1894 as a Cartilla School by the Beaterio Sisters who evacuated from Tamontaca, Cotabato. One of the two sisters who started the Cartilla School in 1894 was Mother Ma. Antera Cruz, RVM. The school was located in front of Plaza Pershing where the City Theatre now stands. The lot and the house belonged to the Lerenzo family of Zamboanga City. The Philippine Revolution of 1896 brought the Sisters back to Manila, where they were reunited with the RVM Sisters in the Beaterio Convent in Sta. Lucia, Intramuros, Manila.

=== 1903-1920 ===
The educational ministry, started in Zamboanga, was disrupted during the years that followed. In 1903, on the request of the Rev. father Superior of the Jesuit Mission in Mindanao, the Sisters returned to Zamboanga to resume their work in the school and in the parish as catechists. Mother Severina Santos was the Superior of the RVM Community in Zamboanga. Her companions were M. Rafael Galvez, M. Jaojoco, and a Junior Sister, Justina Rais.

The Cartilla School admitted boys and girls. Classes included Bible Study (Historia Sagrada), Christian Doctrine (Catecismo), Christian Manners (Urbanidad Cristiana), Spanish Grammar (Gramatica Espanola), Arithmetic (Arithmetica), Geography (Geographia), and Home Arts, Flower-making, and House-keeping (Labores for girls). From the Cartilla and advanced Spanish lessons, the Sisters gradually worked to open the Primary and Elementary Courses in 1914. Government Recognition for the Elementary Graduation was granted in 1918.

From the first graduates were chosen teachers for the Primary and Intermediate Grades, Mother Josefa Regino, among them. She joined the RVM congregation in 1926.

=== 1920-1941 ===
In 1920, the school was transferred to the old “Hospital Senora del Pilar” in Cawa-Cawa Boulevard. The girls High School was opened, with Mother Candelaria Tarcela as the first principal. The school was named “Pilar Institution”. Government Recognition for the High School was granted in 1928 permit to open the Junior Normal College was given in 1940.

The two-year College Secretarial Course opened in 1940. Classes were disrupted when World War II broke out in 1941. The Sisters evacuated in two groups: one went to Tetuan, the other, to Tulungatung, both in Zamboanga City.

=== Post-war reopening ===
Immediately after liberation in 1945, the Sisters resumed classes for the elementary and High School levels in one-floor building of sawali and nipa in La Purisima St, where Ateneo de Zamboanga University is located at present, through the initiative of Mother Carmen Perez, the principal. For lack of classrooms, the school administration resorted to three shifts of classes: morning for the elementary department, afternoon for the High School, and evening for the college.

=== Expansion ===
In 1946, the institution graduated 35 high school students in the temporary school building in the present location. In 1948, Pilar Institution graduated seven girls from the Junior Normal Course and 48 from the high School. On June 21 of the same year, Bishop Luis de Rosario, SJ, DD blessed and laid the cornerstone of a semi-concrete, two storey building facing the sea. In 1949 classes were transferred to this new building which stood at the old site of the Nuestra Senora del Pilar Hospital. The new school building was blessed on September 24, 1949.

More buildings were constructed as enrolment increased. The wooden Elementary building was put up in 1951, followed by the Auditorium in 1957, and the Music building in 1959. The one-room Chapel was replaced by a beautiful two-wing concrete building, as envisioned by an RVM Architect, S. Ma. Mauricia Tapang. The Home Economics building and the Sisters' convent were designed by the same architect. They were finished and blessed in 1964. A semi-concrete one-storey Science building replaced the old laboratory in 1967.

=== College status ===
With improved facilities and the increase in college courses, the Pilar Institution assumed College status and was named “Pilar College”. It offers courses in Education, Liberal Arts, Home Arts, Home Economics and bachelor of Music. In 1947, Government recognition was given to the Education courses. From 1949 to 1971, Pilar College turned out college graduates yearly. However, due to the opening of nearby schools, the Zamboanga Normal School in particular, the administration of Pilar phased out the college courses in 1972. From this year on, Pilar College concentrated on elementary, High Schools and the College of Music Education. The lack of religious teachers in 1975 brought out the Religious training Program to prepared the teachers to handle Christian Living Classes. This was integrated into the bi-monthly, in service training program designed for teachers and non-teaching personnel.

=== 1977-1990 ===
The increasing enrollment of the Elementary Department necessitated the construction of a bigger building. In 1977, the wood building was replaced by a concrete one. Likewise, the Music Department was enlarged to house seven Yamaha organs in 1979. The opening of Yamaha Organ School attracted many students. In the history of Pilar College, a 500-voice Marian Concert, entitled “A tribute to Mary”, was presented during the Marian Year, commemorating the 2000th birth anniversary of the Blessed Virgin Mary. It also marked the Diamond Jubilee of the Archdiocese of Zamboanga.

In line with the thrust to upgrade the education, Pilar College undertook the process of accreditation of the High School. Self-survey started in 1981, leading to the preliminary PAASCU visit in 1984 and the subsequent formal visit. In 1987, the PAASCU (Philippines Accrediting Association of Schools, Colleges and Universities) gave the formal stamp of an accredited status to the High School Department. This made Pilar College the third accredited school of region IX. In 1990, the re-survey of the PAASCU Team resulted of a five-year Accreditation to the High School.

=== Centennial Jubilee year ===
During the last decade was the 1994 Celebration of the Centennial Jubilee Year of Pilar College. Among the most significant activities were the solemn con-celebrated Masses of Thanksgiving held at the launching and the closing of the Centennial Year, the Field Demonstrations, Motorcade with the Centennial Queen and Princesses, The Historical Exhibit, a testimonial Dinner and Award Night with a tableau-Vignette depicting “Pilar College Through The Years”. A project undertaken in 1994 was the construction of a new school building, to replace the old one fronting the sea. The new “Mother Ignacia Building” houses twenty classrooms, the high school and the college Library, Clinic, Guidance Center, and several offices.

=== Accreditation ===
In 1994, the high school department started admitting boys to the first year, thus making all three departments (grade school, high school and college) co-educational. The Grade School which was visited by the PAASCU Team in February 1994 and October 1995, was granted accreditation on January 25, 1996. The High School, which was re-visited by the PAASCU team on August 26–27, 1996 was granted re-accreditation on July 31, 1997. The Grade School Department, after the PAASCU re-visit on February 22–23, 1999, was granted five-year accreditation.

== Student life ==
=== Pilar College All-Stars "Huskies" (PCA Huskies) ===
PCA Huskies is the cheerdance squad in the campus. The squad was formed in 2010 and won second place in Hola Zamboanga Cheerdance Competition 2010, and finally became Champions on 2011 and ranked third in 2012.

== Courses ==
- BS in Tourism
- BS in Hotel and Restaurant Management
- BS in Nursing
- BS in Computer Science
- BS in Info. Management
- Associate in Computer Technology
- BS in Education
- BS in Commerce

"Bachelor of Library and Information Science

The alumnae association is the “Pilar College Alumnae Association”

== See also ==
- Zamboanga City
- List of Tertiary schools in Zamboanga City
