= Ateneo de Zamboanga University =

Jesuit university in Zamboanga City, Philippines

- Pamantasang Ateneo de Zamboanga (Filipino)
- Seal
- Former name: Ateneo de Zamboanga (1916–2001)
- Motto: Latin: Pro Deo et Patria
- Motto in English: In the Service of God and Country
- Type: Private Research Non-profit Coeducational Basic and Higher education institution
- Established: 1912; 114 years ago
- Founder: Society of Jesus
- Religious affiliation: Roman Catholic (Jesuits)
Academic affiliations
AJCU-AP PAASCU COCOPEA ZAMBASULTAPS	JBEC; CEAP ASEACCU
- Chairman: Pedro Rufo N. Soliven
- President: Fr. Guillrey Anthony "Ernald" M. Andal, S.J.
- Vice-president: List: Fr. Richard V. Ella, SJ (VP for Administration); Fr. Manny A. Uy, SJ (VP for Basic Education); Fr. Rene C. Tacastacas, SJ (VP for Higher Education)
- Principal: Br.Jeffrey U. Pioquinto, SJ (Senior High School); Fr. Roberto M. Boholst, SJ (Junior High School); Elena B. Segurigan (Grade School)
- Dean: List: Jaybee D. Bazan (School of Medicine); Atty Maria Corazon J. Montemor (College of Law); Maria Lorna B. Paber (College of Nursing); Jocelyn D. Partosa (College of Science, Information Technology, and Engineering); Dorothy Joann Lei L. Rabajante (School of Education); Robin A. Delos Reyes (School of Liberal Arts); Dexter C. Velez (School of Management & Accountancy)
- Students: Total – 6,444; Grade School – 1,349; High School – 1,085; College – 3,402; Graduate School – 378; Professional Schools – 230
- Location: La Purisima St. Zamboanga City, Philippines; 6°54′37.4″N 122°4′31.66″E
- Campus: Main Salvador Campus 4.3 hectares (460,000 sq ft) La Purisima St. Zamboanga City (Senior High School, Undergraduate, Graduate and Professional Schools) Satellite; Kreutz Campus 8.3 hectares (890,000 sq ft) Brgy Tumaga, Zamboanga City (Grade School and Junior High School); Lantaka Campus N. S. Valderroza St. Zamboanga City
- Newspaper: The Beacon Publications
- Patron saints: Blessed Virgin Mary (Under the title Our Lady of the Immaculate Conception); St. Ignatius of Loyola
- Colors: Blue and White
- Nickname: Blue Eagles
- Sporting affiliations: PRISAA, PSZCAA
- Mascot: Azul Aguila (Blue Eagle)
- Website: adzu.edu.ph
- Location in Mindanao Location in the Philippines

The Ateneo de Zamboanga University (Filipino: Pamantasang Ateneo de Zamboanga), also referred to by its acronym AdZU, is a private, Catholic, co-educational, basic and higher education institution in Zamboanga City, Philippines. Founded in 1912 by Spanish Jesuits as an all-boys parochial school of the Immaculate Conception parish, it is the second oldest Jesuit-administered institution in the Philippines.

== History ==
=== Founding (1912–1916) ===
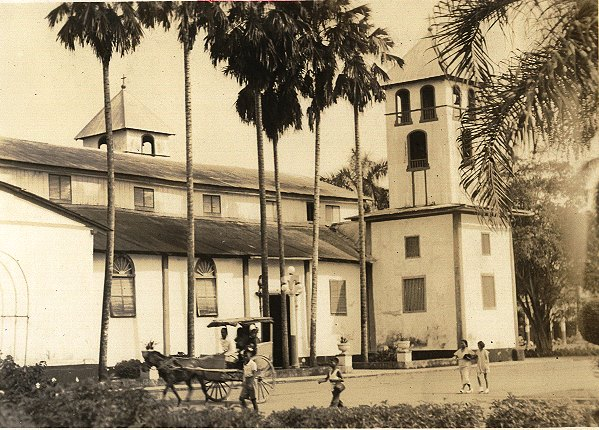
The site of Escuela Catolica at the Immaculate Conception parish church.

In 1912, a parochial elementary school was opened by the Spanish Jesuits as an escuela catolica for the Immaculate Conception parish. Fr. Manuel Ma. Sauras, S.J. was the director of the school and Fr. Miguel Saderra Mata, S.J., the parish priest who was formerly the rector of Ateneo Municipal, subsidized the school. Classes were being held in a wooden building that also housed the garage of the Mindanao Transit. It was located near the cathedral along Plaza de Don Juan de Salcedo (now Plaza Pershing), but was later demolished and replaced with the Mindanao Theater. Classes then moved to the ground floor of the church rectory.

=== Pre-war Ateneo (1916–1941) ===
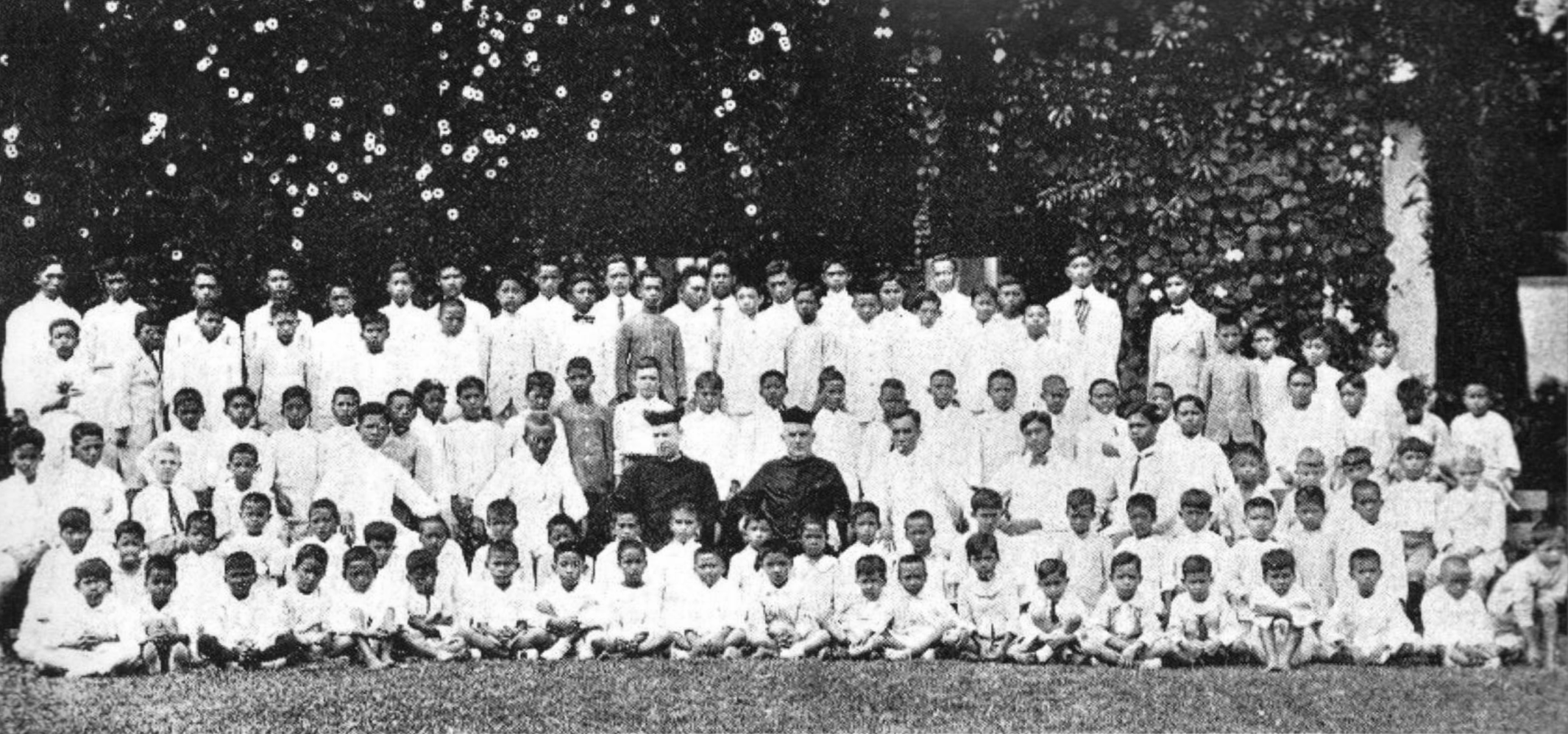
The students and faculty of Ateneo in 1917 with Fr. Sauras and Bishop Clos.

In 1916, Bishop Michael J. O'Doherty, the then bishop of Zamboanga, had requested that the Jesuits open a school similar to the Ateneo de Manila to address the need to maintain quality education in parochial schools. An annual subsidy of 1,000 pesos, along with one-fourth of the diocesan revenue, the parish rectory, and financial support from the Catholic Action and various sources, were offered for the new school. With the approval of the Jesuit mission superior, Fr. Francisco X. Tena, S.J., the school was named "Ateneo de Zamboanga" on October 28, 1916 with seven grade levels.

In the 1920s, the Philippine mission of the Jesuits had been transferred from the Province of Aragon to the Province of Maryland-New York, and American Jesuits began to replace the Spanish Jesuits. Part of this transfer was the assignment of Fr. Thomas J. Murray, S.J., an Irish American Jesuit, as parish priest in September 1926. He ordered the building of new classrooms on the second floor of the convent above the sacristry between the church proper and the priests' quarters. A decade after the opening of the Protestant-owned Silliman Institute in Dumaguete City, a petition to Fr. James Carlin, S.J., the then Jesuit Mission Superior, to open a Catholic high school had been initiated by the Catholic locals in the first quarter of 1928. When Fr. Thomas returned to Zamboanga after being assigned elsewhere, he became the first American director of the school. His arrival coincided with the opening of the high school in June 1928.

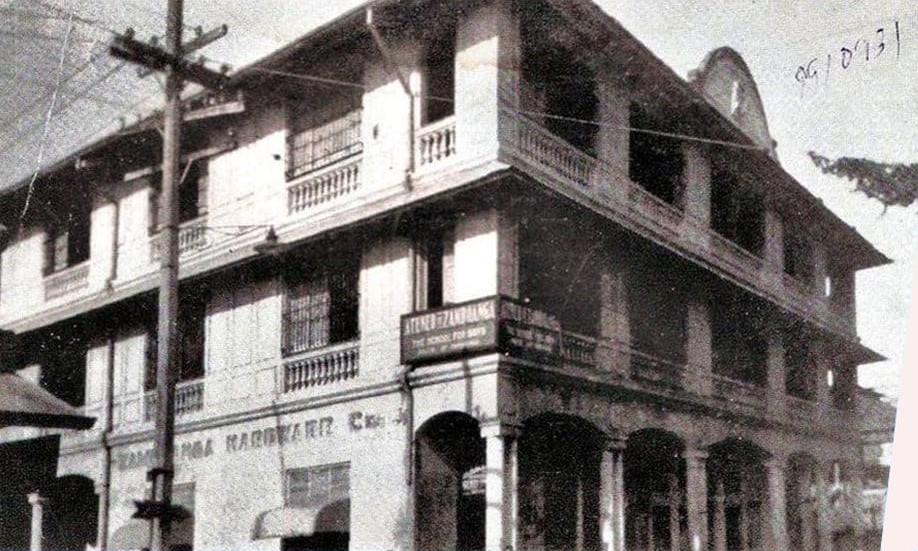
The Ateneo building in the 1930s, formerly the Mindanao Theater. Their motto was "The School for Boys" at the time.

High school classes were held at the third floor of the Mindanao Theater building, previously purchased by the Knights of Columbus (K of C) under the direction of Bishop José Clos y Pagés, S.J. for 80,000 pesos In 1930, management of the school was fully handed over from the Spanish Jesuits to the American Jesuits. During Fr. Thomas' tenure, Ateneo eventually occupied the entire K of C building. The high school was officially recognized by the city government in 1932, and the first graduates were produced in the same year, with Roseller T. Lim as the valedictorian. College classes were opened in June 1938 and offered Commerce and Pre-Law courses.

In 1940, Fr. Eusebio G. Salvador, S.J. purchased 18 adjoining lots totaling 2.8 hectares on a new site outside the poblacion named the Jardin de Chino y Camino Nuevo, located along Bailen Street (now La Purisima Street) and used the property as parade grounds.

Ateneo closed down during the outbreak of World War II in 1941. The building was taken over by the Japanese and was converted into a public elementary school. On March 8–9, 1945, American troops bombed and shelled buildings prior to the liberation of the city from Japanese occupation, leaving two-thirds of the city destroyed, including the K of C Building and the Immaculate Conception cathedral.

=== Post-war Ateneo (1946–present) ===
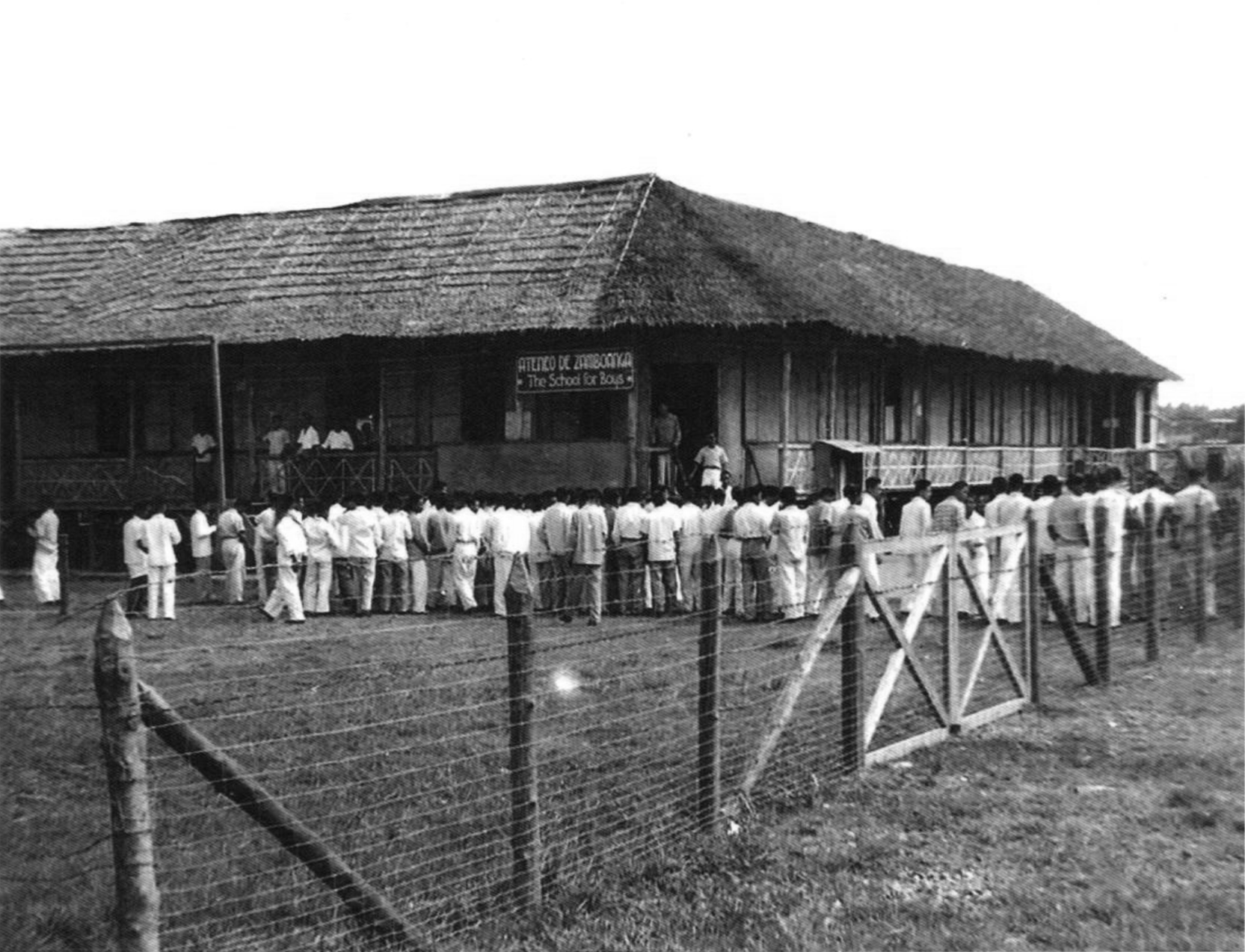
Ateneo re-opening classes in nipa-sawali buildings.

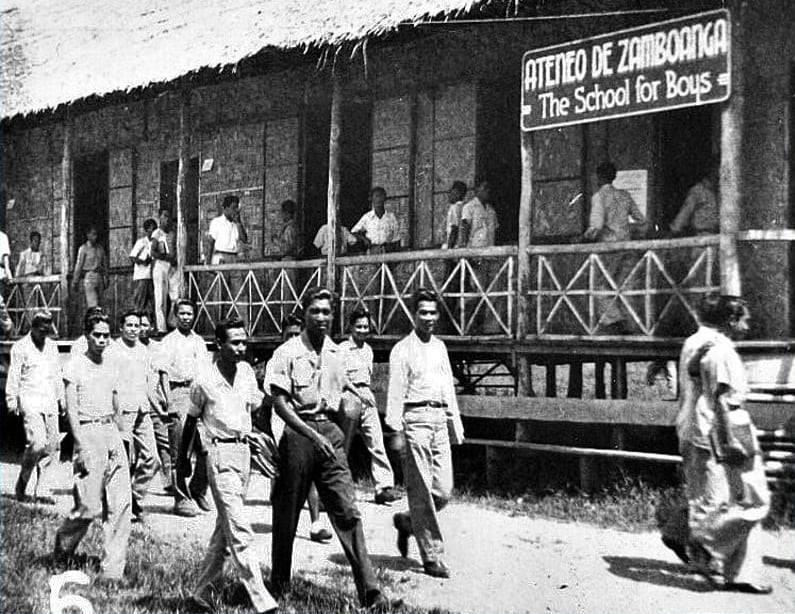
All-male students in front of the main building, with the school retaining their pre-war motto.

On February 13, 1946, a letter to the Jesuit Mission Superior was sent by Bishop Luis Del Rosario, urging the reopening of the Ateneo to "counteract possible Protestant activities." High school and intermediate classes were reopened in July 1946 and were held in a nipa-sawali building on the new site purchased by Fr. Eusebio before the war. The new campus was shared with students from Pilar College for a year before they moved to their new campus at Cawa-Cawa Boulevard. In September 1947, an extra 1.5 hectares (160,000 sq ft) was purchased to accommodate for more buildings.

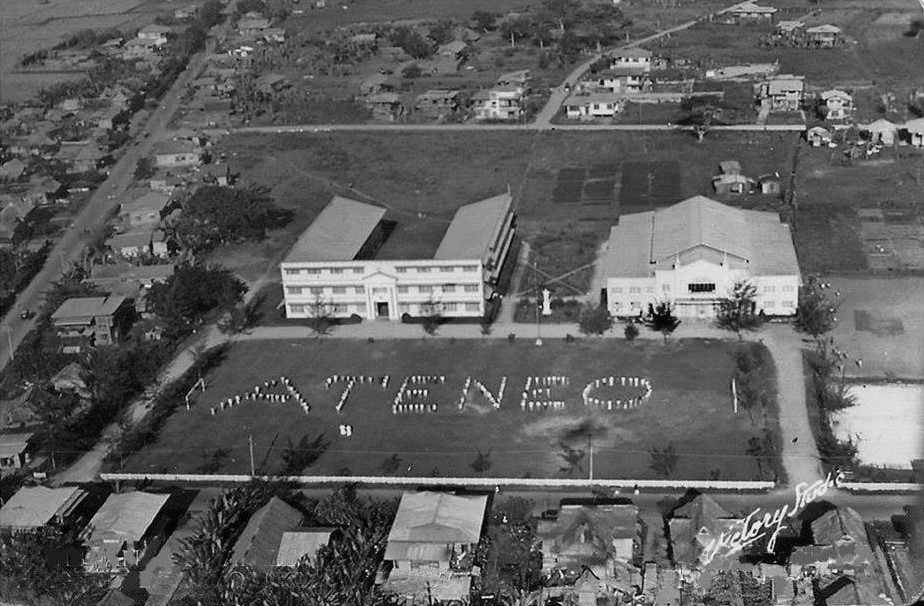
New wooden buildings replaced the old nipa-sawali classrooms in 1949.

A three-story building was then constructed on the site to replace the old nipa-sawali building, and the first classes in the building were held on March 28, 1949. In the same year, the Ateneo was officially recognized as a Jesuit school, separate from the parish, and Fr. Alfredo Paguia, S.J. became its first rector on June 16, 1949.

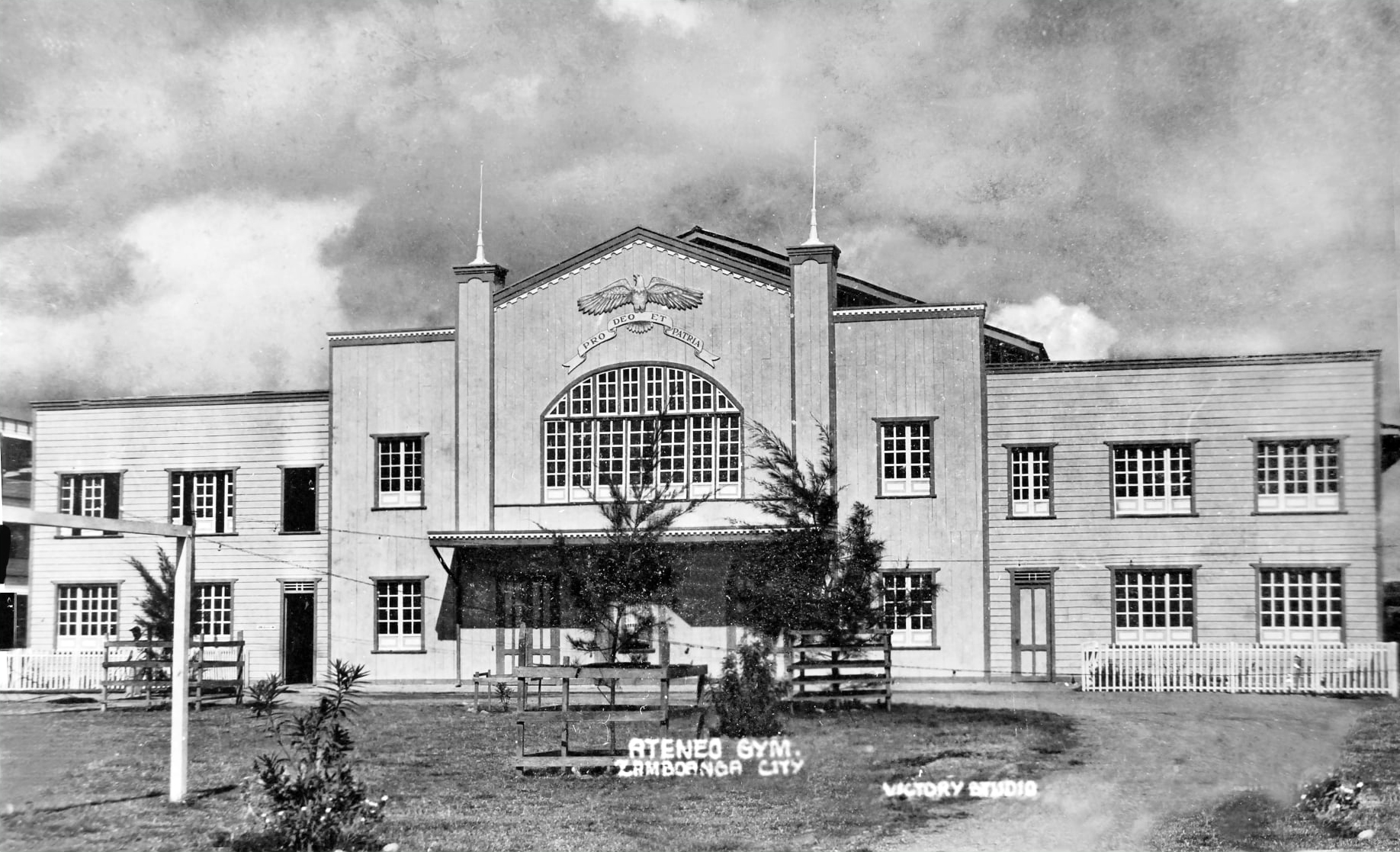
The Brebeuf Gymnasium shortly after its completion.

The Brebeuf Gymnasium, named in honor of Saint Jean de Brébeuf, S.J., was constructed in 1950. The Zamboanga Amateur Athletic Federation (ZAAF) Basketball League regularly held their games here.

Post-war college classes opened in 1952 and has since been co-educational. It initially offered two-year courses for Associate in Arts and Pre-Law and four-year courses for Bachelor of Arts, Bachelor of Science in Education, and Bachelor of Science in Commerce degrees. The high school started offering night classes in 1954 for students working in government offices. The college started offering courses for Pre-Nursing and Pre-Engineering in 1954 and 1955 respectively. In 1956, the college and high school became separate departments.

More buildings were added to the new site to accommodate the increasing number of enrollments. The Chapel of the Sacred Heart was constructed in 1961, the Gonzaga Hall in 1964, the Canisius Hall in 1967 and the Berchmans and Kostka Hall for the Grade School in 1972. The graduate school soon opened in 1976 and offered a Master in Business Administration program; the first in Region IX.

It was by this time that local and international sponsors started funding new buildings. The Philippine Coconut Producers Federation, Inc. (COCOFED) sponsored the Bellarmine-Campion building for the high school administration and the science and mass communication departments, and construction was completed in 1979. Soon, the Ateneo started accepting girls for the basic education units, starting with the kindergarten in 1984. The grade school and high school soon following after. In 1987, the Learning Resource Center was constructed through a grant from the American Schools and Hospitals Abroad.

Discussions were held in 1990 between health professionals and community leaders regarding the need for a medical school in Western Mindanao due to the region having the highest infant mortality rate in the Philippines at the time, among other factors. The nearby Western Mindanao State University was the first to be given approval to open a medical school in the region. However, plans were cancelled due to budget constraints. Fr. William H. Kreutz, S.J., the university president during this time, established the Zamboanga Medical School Foundation, Inc. (ZMSF) as a non-stock, non-profit organization in 1991.

=== University status ===
On August 20, 2001, the Ateneo de Zamboanga was granted university status by the Commission on Higher Education and is the only higher education institution in Western Mindanao to receive a Fully Autonomous status. Soon, ZMSF merged with the Ateneo in 2004 and became the AdZU School of Medicine.

The High School building was the first built at the Kreutz Campus.

A new campus named the Fr. William H. Kreutz, S.J., in honor of the university president at the time, started construction in Barangay Tumaga on July 30, 2005, for the basic education units. A year after, in 2006, construction completed, and high school classes were transferred to the new high school building.

Around 2009, the Board of Trustees explored the feasibility of opening a law school in the Ateneo. Due to a moratorium in place preventing new law schools from being opened in the Philippines, it was decided that the new law school was to be a branch of the Xavier University College of Law. A certificate of authority was issued on May 18, 2011, and the Xavier University College of Law – Zamboanga opened in June 2011. Legal Education Board members later granted the Ateneo a permit to open a law school through an order dated January 13, 2014.

Construction started for a new grade school complex that was to be a part of the Kreutz Campus. A groundbreaking was held on July 31, 2012, as part of the university's centennial, with construction starting on August 15, 2013. The grade school transferred to the new complex after its inauguration on June 15, 2015.

==== Brebeuf gym fire and rebuilding ====
The aftermath of the 2016 fire, which burned down the entirety of the Brebeuf Gymnasium as well as severely damaging surrounding buildings on campus.

On July 7, 2016, the historic 67-year-old Brebeuf Gymnasium was burned to the ground; the Sauras, Kostka, and Gonzaga Halls were also damaged from the fire. Classes were called off during this time, and there were no reported casualties. The Zamboanga City government estimated that the cost of the damages amounted to ₱5 million. As part of rebuilding efforts, the Faustino W. Saavedra Building (FWS Building) and the second Multi-Purpose Covered Court were built on the grounds of the former Brebeuf Gym and were inaugurated on December 8, 2018.

=== Recent events ===
In 2019, Lantaka Hotel, the oldest hotel in Zamboanga, was donated to Ateneo though a donation made by the Walstrom Family and was renamed to the AdZU Lantaka Campus. On March 22, 2020, amid COVID-19 lockdowns, it was converted by the city government into a COVID-19 isolation and treatment facility and was temporarily renamed to the Private Hospitals Association of the Philippines (PHAPi–Lantaka) COVID-19 Facility. In 2022, as the COVID-19 pandemic saw less cases during the year, it was returned to Ateneo from the city government and reopened on October 10, 2022, with future renovations planned for the campus.

On June 11, 2024, the Ateneo de Manila University School of Law partnered with the AdZU College of Law (now Rosendo U. Castillo, Jr. College of Law) to offer a Masters of Law program in AdZU.

On August 18, 2026, a school shooting occurred on the University's junior high campus, leaving twenty-three people injured and two, including the perpetrator dead.

== Academics ==
The Ateneo offers undergraduate and graduate degree programs through its three colleges and four schools, with most offering science degrees.

=== Admissions ===
AdZU operates with a selective admissions policy. All of the university's courses require, among other things, passing an entrance exam (which, in the case of the Grade School, is instead called an 'assessment test'); past education records are also required for examination. The School of Medicine requires results in the National Medical Admission Test while the College of Law requires results in the PhilSAT; all other units administer through the school's own College Entrance Test initiated by the Admissions and Aid.

== Organization and administration ==
Ateneo de Zamboanga University Presidents
Name	Tenure of office
Director
Fr. Manuel Ma. Sauras, S.J.	1912–1928
Fr. Thomas J. Murray, S.J.	1928–1935
Fr. Juan E. Gaerlan, S.J.	1935–1936
Fr. Jose Buxo, S.J.	1936–1937
Fr. Walter F. Hyland, S.J.	1937–1938
Fr. Eusebio G. Salvador, S.J.	1938–1941; 1946–1947
Fr. Andrew F. Cervini, S.J.	1947–1949
Rector
Fr. Alfredo E.I. Paguia, S.J.	1949–1953
Fr. Paul B. Hugendobler, S.J.	1953–1959
Fr. Emmanuel C. Regalado, S.J.	1959–1962
Fr. Antonio M. Cuna, S.J.	1962–1965
Fr. Vincent M. McNally, S.J.	1965–1969
Fr. Ramon M. Mores, S.J.	1969–1971; 1977–1979
Fr. Asterio J. Katigbak, S.J.	1971–1977
President
Fr. Ernesto A. Carretero, S.J.	1979–1989
Fr. William H. Kreutz, S.J.	1989–2007
Fr. Antonio F. Moreno, S.J.	2007–2013
Fr. Karel S. San Juan, S.J.	2013–2023
Fr. Guillrey Anthony M. Andal, S.J.	2023–
Ref.

=== Governance ===
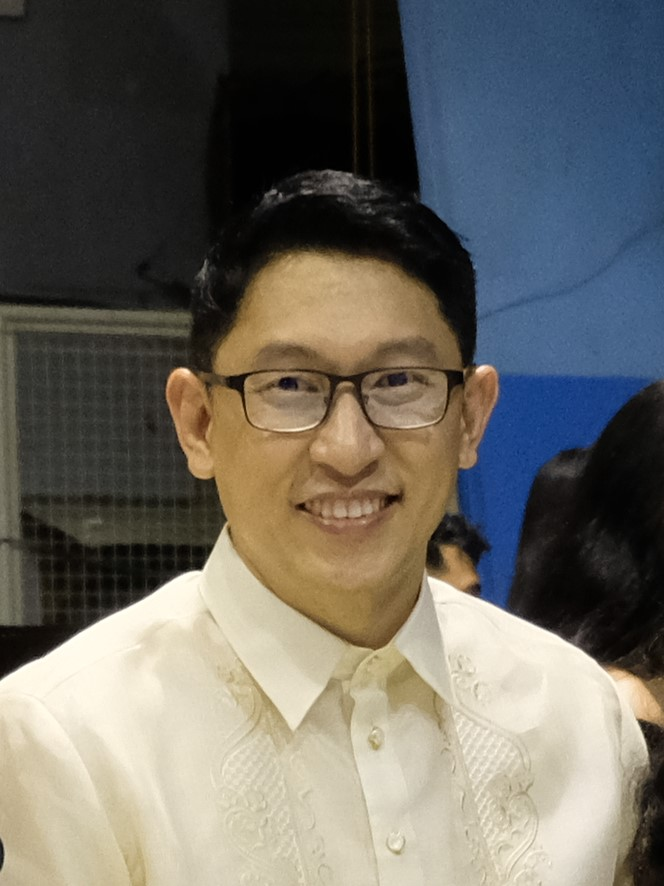
The current president, Fr. Ernald Andal, S.J.

The Ateneo is governed as a private, nonprofit corporation by a board of trustees responsible for overseeing the long-term interests of the university. The board consists of 15 members with at least 8 Jesuit members.

The Ateneo is administered by a president who is elected by the board of trustees from the Jesuit members of the board to a six-year term. There is no limit to how many terms the president can serve. Under him are four vice presidents with two being the heads of the basic and higher education units, one for administration, and one for the university's formation efforts.

Prior to the 1970s, the head of the local Jesuit community was also the rector of the Ateneo, and they were appointed by the Jesuit Provincial Superior. Efforts were made by the Jesuits to incorporate Ateneo and establish a board of trustees, and on February 25, 1979, Fr. Ernesto Carretero, S.J. was the first president elected by the newly established Board of Trustees.

The current president is Fr. Guillrey Anthony M. Andal, S.J.

=== Academic affiliations ===
The Ateneo is a member of the Association of Jesuit Colleges and Universities in Asia-Pacific (AJCU-AP), the Jesuit Basic Education Commission (JBEC), the Catholic Educational Association of the Philippines (CEAP), the Coordinating Council of Private Educational Associations (COCOPEA), the Association of Southeast and East Asian Colleges and Universities (ASEACCU), and the Zamboanga Basilan Sulu Tawi-Tawi Association of Private Schools (ZAMBASULTAPS).

== Campuses ==
The Bellarmine-Campion Hall, with the FWS Hall behind it

The Ateneo operates three campuses within the city.

- Fr. Eusebio G. Salvador, S.J. (Main) Campus. The main campus (4.3 hectares) on La Purisima Street, named for Fr. Eusebio Salvador, S.J., houses the administration and admissions offices of the university, as well as the undergraduate and graduate schools and the Senior High School unit.
- Fr. William H. Kreutz, S.J. Campus. The second campus (8.3 hectares) in Barangay Tumaga, which is outside the city proper, named for Fr. William Kreutz, S.J., is home to the Junior High School and Grade School units.
- Lantaka Campus. The Lantaka Campus is situated along the coastline of Zamboanga City and was previously a resort hotel. It serves as an innovation center for the Zamboanga Peninsula, hosting various programs on entrepreneurship and catering to startups, SMEs, and innovators. Its spaces are also used as a place for students' and staff's retreats, recollections, meetings, seminars, and conferences.

== Student life ==
=== Campus organizations ===
The Ateneo officially recognizes over 150 clubs and organizations in its basic and higher education units, including 11 academic organizations that each represent its colleges and schools. College students with at least 12 units and a 1.5 GPA or higher are allowed to join campus organizations. Clubs and organizations are unique to each academic unit, while the university's concert band and glee club are the only organizations open to multiple academic units.

The El Consejo Atenista, as AdZU's official student government, engages with other Jesuit universities' student councils in the annual Buklod Atenista National Leaders' Summit. They are also active in community initiatives, such as organizing relief operations during the 2013 Zamboanga City Siege and protesting against the implementation of mandatory Reserve Officers' Training Corps in the Philippines.

Each academic unit has its own student publication, with the oldest being The Beacon Publications, founded in 1946. It mainly publishes online content through social media platforms and releases print editions in English and local languages. The Ateneo Communicators, an organization of the School of Liberal Arts, also hosts Radyo Atenista, covering and live streaming events during the annual Ateneo Fiesta. The university's peer-reviewed journal, Asia Mindanaw, is published by the research office.

=== Athletics ===
The Ateneo's varsity athletics teams participate regularly at the Jesuit Athletic Meet (JAM), the Private Schools of Zamboanga Athletic Association (PSZCAA) Meet, the Zamboanga Peninsula Regional Athletic Association (ZPRAA) Meet, and the Catholic Educational Association of the Philippines (CEAP) Regional Games. Some of its teams also compete internationally, such as in martial arts competitions. Its mascot is the Azul Aguila, and its colors are blue and white.

==== Athletics history ====
The Ateneo's first athletics teams were formed after the arrival of American Jesuits in the late 1920s. They competed during the annual intramurals and locally against other schools and American soldiers. The athletics teams were then disbanded in the early 1940s due to the war. After new athletics teams were formed, they started using the Blue Eagle as its moniker in the year the Brebeuf Gym finished construction, ahead of the Ateneo de Manila.

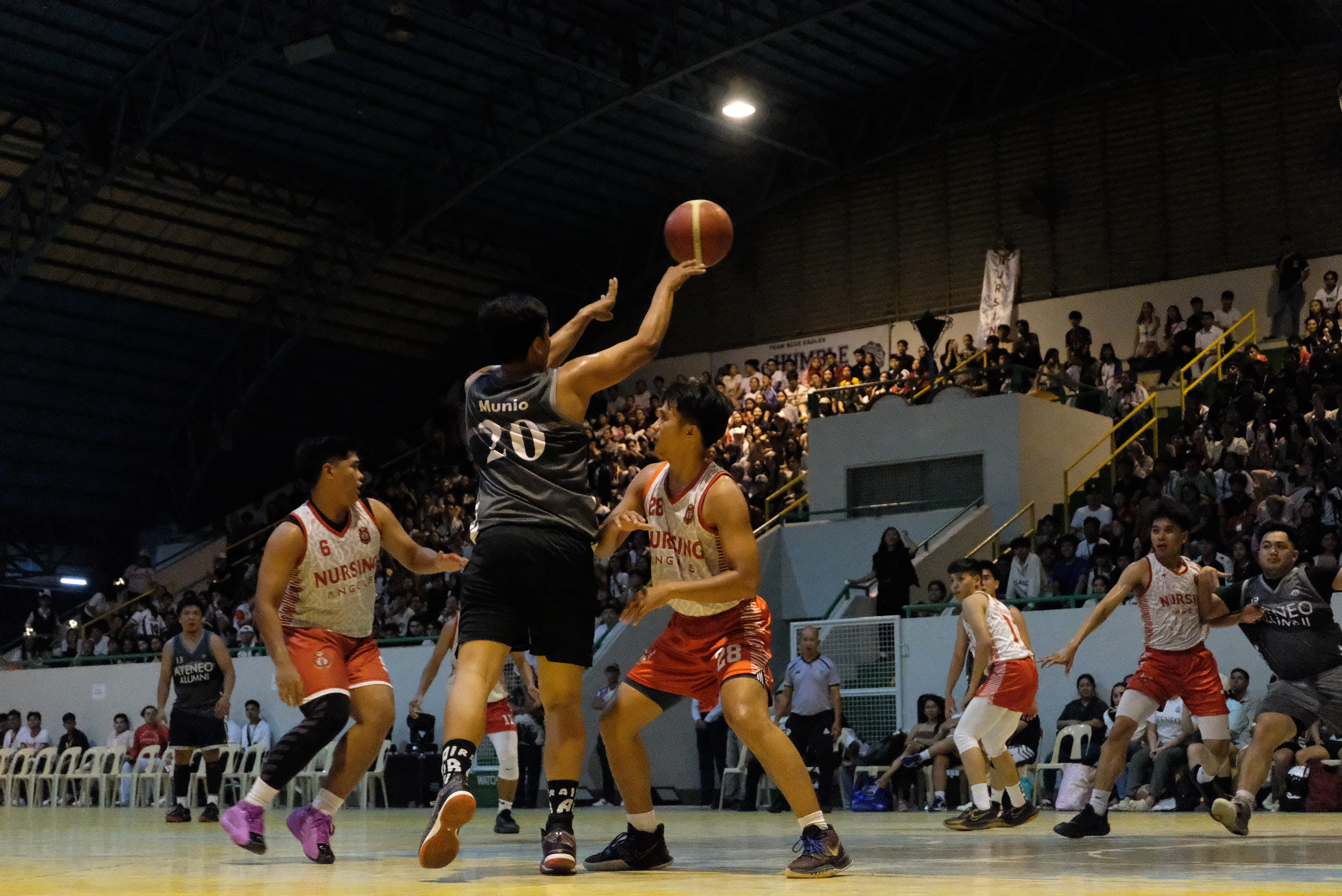
The Ateneo Fiesta holds competitions between different academic units, faculty, staff, and alumni.

=== Traditions ===
==== Ateneo Fiesta ====
The Ateneo Fiesta, often shortened to AtFest, is an annual celebration usually held around the end of the first semester after the alumni homecoming. Previously named Palarong Ateneo, the event serves as an intramural competition for different academic units, faculty, staff, and alumni and is held at its main campus.

== Notable alumni ==
- Roseller T. Lim, first and only Zamboangueño elected to the Philippine Senate
- Cesar Climaco, former mayor of Zamboanga City
- Bobby Nalzaro, broadcast journalist, radio commentator and columnist
- Beng Climaco, current vice mayor and former mayor of Zamboanga City

== See also ==
- List of Jesuit educational institutions in the Philippines
- List of Jesuit educational institutions
- List of Jesuit sites
- Ateneo de Zamboanga University Concert Band
