= Zamboanga Cathedral =

Roman Catholic church in Zamboanga City, Philippines

- Metropolitan Cathedral of the Immaculate Conception
- Catedral Metropolitana de la Inmaculada Concepción de Zamboanga (Spanish)
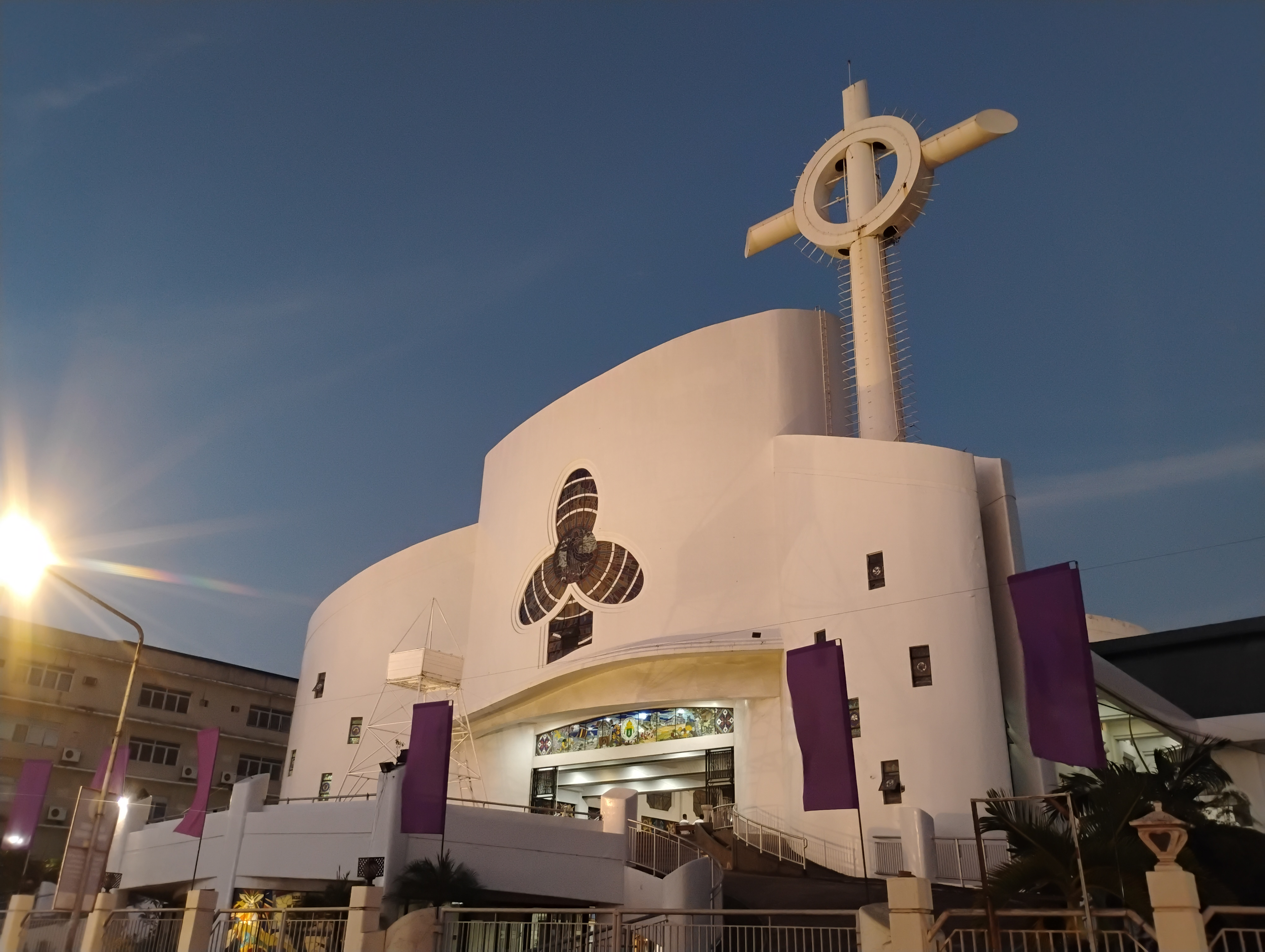
- Cathedral façade in 2026

- Location in Mindanao Location in the Philippines
- 6°54′32″N 122°04′34″E
- Location: Zamboanga City
- Country: Philippines
- Denomination: Roman Catholic

Architecture
- Functional status: Active
- Architect(s): Abarro and Associates
- Architectural type: Cathedral
- Style: Modern
- Groundbreaking: 1998
- Completed: 2002
- Construction cost: about ₱85,000,000

Specifications
- Capacity: 1,000+ (main church)
- Materials: concrete, steel

Administration
- Archdiocese: Zamboanga

The Metropolitan Cathedral of the Immaculate Conception, commonly known as Zamboanga Cathedral, is a Roman Catholic church located in Zamboanga City, Philippines. It is the seat of the Archdiocese of Zamboanga.

== History ==
The first church was originally located at the front of Plaza Pershing, where the present Universidad de Zamboanga stands. The church was designated a cathedral in 1910 when the Diocese of Zamboanga was created. In 1943, the cathedral was one of the edifices bombarded by Japanese soldiers during World War II. In 1956, the cathedral was relocated beside Ateneo de Zamboanga University, formerly known as the Jardin de Chino.

== Features of the cathedral ==
=== The original cathedral ===
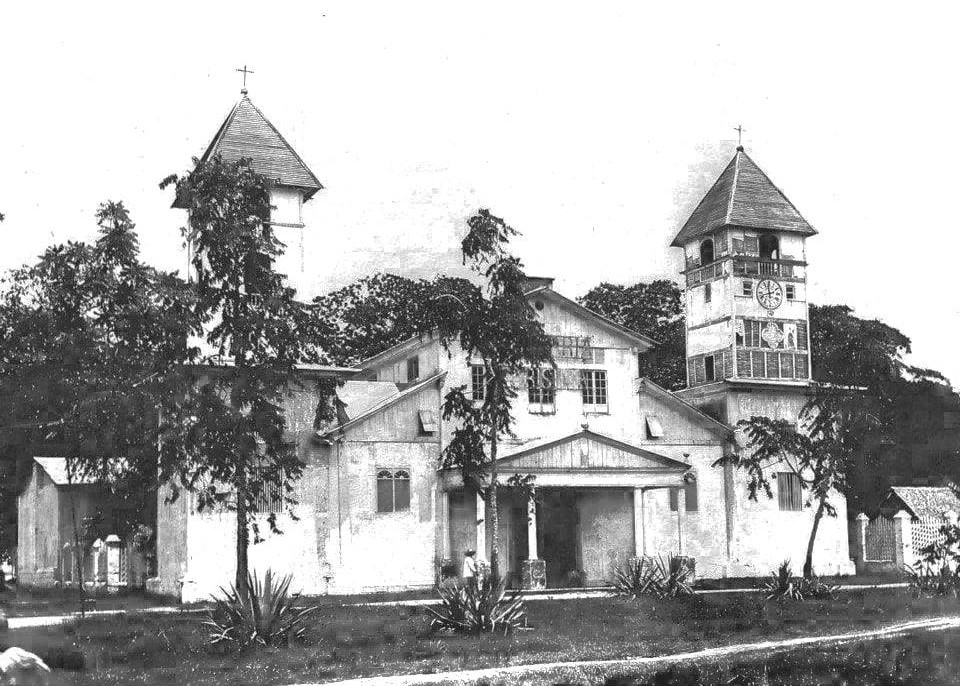
The Immaculate Conception parish in the 1880s

The cathedral located at the Plaza Pershing was constructed in 1870 and was made of wood and concrete. The image of the Immaculate Conception was located at the main altar, with two Jesuit saints, Ignatius of Loyola and Francis Xavier, on each side.

During the liberation from Japanese occupation on March 8–9, 1945, American forces conducted aerial bombings and artillery shelling on the city, which destroyed two-thirds of the buildings in the city including the cathedral. The image of the patroness was said to be spared from the bombs of World War II and was transferred to a road now known as La Purisima Street. Records were also spared as well.

=== The old cathedral at La Purisima (1956–1998) ===
The former structure of the cathedral was designed in 1956. The site used to be the chapel of the Jardin de Chino. The façade consists of the life-size sculpture of Immaculate Conception at the left side and the bell tower at right. The chapel of the saints were located inside the area where the image outside was located. The Stations of the Cross were made of stained glass at each side and the added station, "Resurrection", was located near the right altar at the confession area. Then the bronze relief of the Last Supper was located at the day chapel which serves later as the perpetual adoration chapel.

=== The Metropolitan Cathedral (1998–present) ===
Church interior in 2024

The present structure of the cathedral was built in 1998–2002 in cruciform, of which the candle-like design is appropriate to the cathedral's patron. Inside the main church is marble statue of the Immaculate Conception designed by National Artist for Sculpture Napoleón Abueva. Along the aisles are stained glass images symbolising all dioceses in Mindanao from 1910 to 1984. The day chapel on the ground floor is used for weekday Masses, and fronting it is the baptistery with a relic of Our Lady of the Pillar, the city patroness. Behind the day chapel is the columbarium with a replica of Michelangelo's Pietà and stained glass images of the 12 apostles around it. The left wing houses the parish office and the adoration chapel, while the convention hall is in the right wing. The original statue of the Immaculate Conception, which was at the high altar of the old cathedral, is in the parish office.

The new cathedral was designed by Abarro and Associates through the efforts of former Msgr. Crisanto de la Cruz, who said termite damage of the old cathedral's ceiling was a reason for the reconstruction. The design of the new cathedral was unveiled in December 1997. The old structure had been demolished on Easter Monday 1998, preserving the stained glass window and sculpture from the façade, now located at the new window of and at the left side. The cathedral was solemnly dedicated on December 6, 1999, with Cardinal Ricardo Vidal, Archbishop of Cebu, and President Joseph Estrada as guests of honor. The day chapel, columbarium, baptistery, multi-purpose hall, and office were finished in 2002.

A more recent addition to the cathedral is the Century Bell Tower, which broke ground on the feast of the Immaculate Conception in 2010. The belfry, located on the Ateneo side of the cathedral, marks the centennial of the Diocese of Zamboanga.

== Chapel communities under the cathedral parish ==
- Saint Catherine of Siena – Sta. Catalina
- Christ the King – Martha Community
- Barangay Sang Birhen – Lustre Community
- Our Lady of Lourdes – BEC of Sucabon
- San Nicholas de Tolentino – Canelar Ronda
- Our Lady of Fatima – Camino Nuevo
- San Lorenzo Ruiz – Canelar Tabuk
- Sagrada Familia – Camino Nuevo
- Our Mother of Perpetual Help – Canelar Presa
